= Liberal international order =

Global relationships since the late 1940s

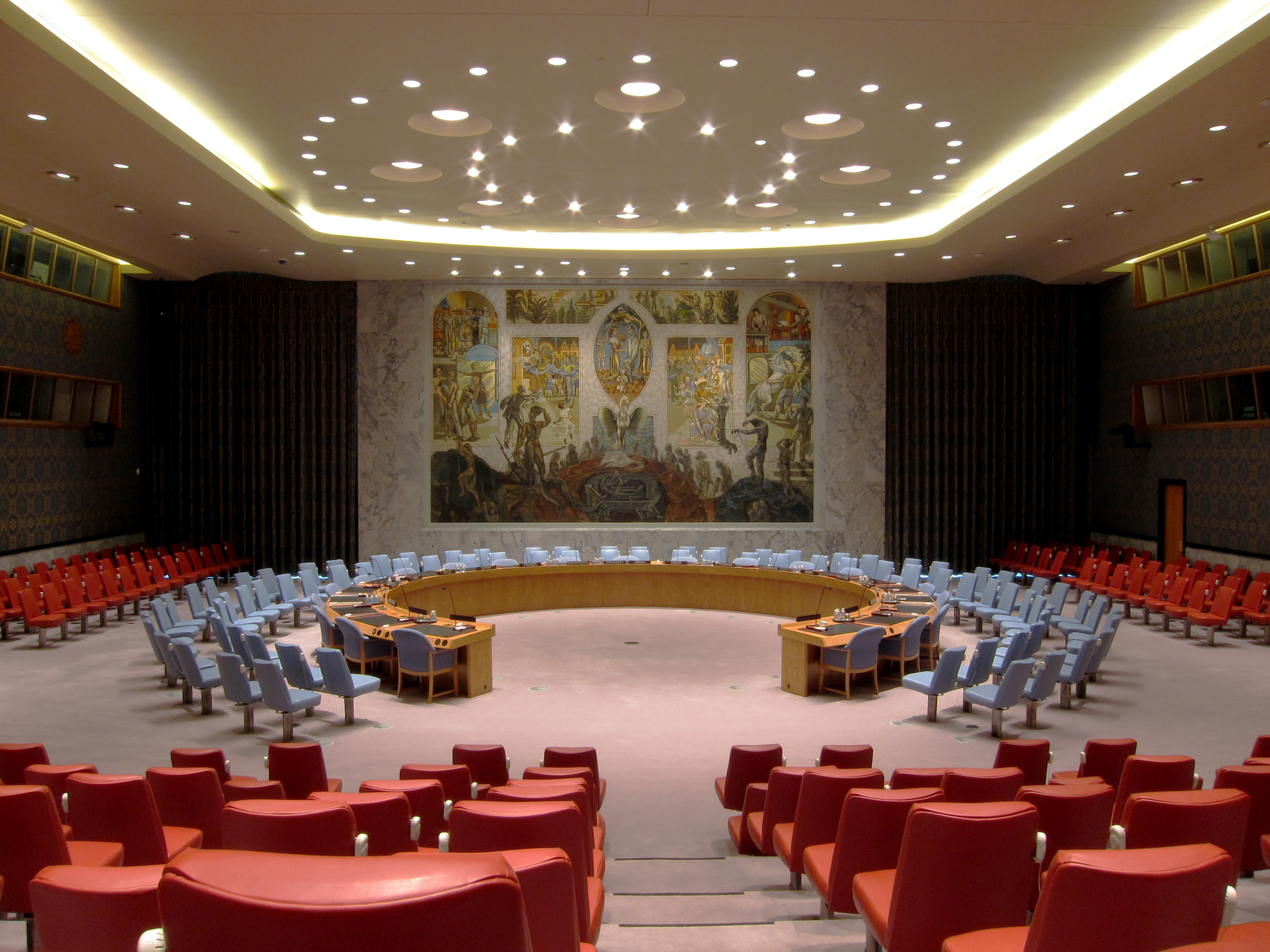
The United Nations Security Council is an embodiment of the liberal international order.

In international relations, the liberal international order (LIO), also known as the rules-based order (RBO), consists of a set of global, rule-based, structured relationships based on political liberalism, economic liberalism and liberal internationalism since the late 1940s. More specifically, it entails international cooperation through multilateral institutions (like the United Nations, World Trade Organization and International Monetary Fund) and is constituted by human equality (freedom, rule of law and human rights), open markets, security cooperation, promotion of liberal democracy, and monetary cooperation. The order was established in the aftermath of World War II, led in large part by the United States.

The nature of the LIO, as well as its very existence, has been debated by scholars. The LIO has been credited with expanding free trade, increasing capital mobility, spreading democracy, promoting human rights, and collectively defending the Western world from the Soviet Union. The LIO facilitated unprecedented cooperation among the states of North America, Western Europe and Japan. Over time, the LIO facilitated the spread of economic liberalism to the rest of the world, as well as helped consolidate democracy in formerly fascist or communist countries.

Origins of the LIO have commonly been identified as the 1940s, usually starting in 1945, with some scholars pointing to earlier agreements between the WWII-era Allies such as the Atlantic Charter in 1941. John Mearsheimer has dissented with this view, arguing that the LIO only arose after the end of the Cold War. Core founding members of the LIO include the states of North America, Western Europe and Japan; these states form a security community. The characteristics of the LIO have varied over time. Some scholars refer to a Cold War variation of the LIO largely limited to the West, and a post-Cold War variation having a more widespread scope and giving international institutions more powers.

Aspects of the LIO are challenged within liberal states by populism, protectionism and nativism, as well as growing hostility by conservatives to the LIO. Scholars argue that embedded liberalism (or the logics inherent in the Double Movement) are crucial for maintaining public support for the LIO’s planks, but some contend that aspects of embedded liberalism have been weakened, prompting a backlash against the LIO.

Externally, the LIO is challenged by authoritarian states, illiberal states, and states that are discontented with their roles in world politics. China, Russia, Iran, North Korea and the United States have been characterized as prominent challengers to the LIO. Some scholars have argued that the LIO contains self-undermining aspects that could trigger backlash or collapse. As of 2026, the LIO is considered to be under severe strain and commentators have started asking what a new future order might look like.

== Definition ==
Minimalist definitions of the LIO characterize it as "open and rules-based international order" while maximalist definitions include liberal social purpose, economic and political rights, and democratic decision-making procedures.

David Lake, Lisa Martin and Thomas Risse define "order" as "patterned or structured relationships among units". Interactions in the LIO are structured by rules, norms and decision-making procedures. They note that the LIO is not synonymous with a "rule-based international order", as non-liberal rule-based orders may exist (such as the Westphalian order). Others refer to the LIO as the rules-based international order (RBIO), or the rules-based order (RBO).

Lake, Martin and Risse define "liberal" as a belief in the universal equality of individuals, as well as individual and collective freedoms. Political liberalism entails the rule of law, and the sovereign equality of states, as well as protections for human rights, political rights and civil liberties. Economic liberalism entails free market-oriented policies. Liberal internationalism entails principled multilateralism and global governance.

Michael Barnett defines an international order as "patterns of relating and acting" derived from and maintained by rules, institutions, law and norms. International orders have both a material and social component. Legitimacy (the generalized perception that actions are desirable, proper or appropriate) is essential to political orders. George Lawson has defined an international order as "regularized practices of exchange among discrete political units that recognize each other to be independent." John Mearsheimer defines an international order as "an organized group of international institutions that help govern the interactions among the member states."

In After Victory (2001), John Ikenberry defines a political order as "the governing arrangements among a group of states, including its fundamental rules, principles and institutions." Political orders are established when the basic organizing arrangements are set up, and they break down when the basic organizing arrangements are overturned, contested or in disarray. He defines a constitutional international order as a political order "organized around agreed-upon legal and political institutions that operate to allocate rights and limit the exercise of power." There are four main core elements of constitutional orders:

1. Shared agreement about the rules of the game within the order
2. Rules and institutions that bind and limit the exercise of power
3. Institutional autonomy from special interests
4. The entrenchment of these rules and institutions with a broader, immutable political system.

In 2018, Ikenberry defined the liberal international order as:

multilayered, multifaceted, and not simply a political formation imposed by the leading state. International order is not “one thing” that states either join or resist. It is an aggregation of various sorts of ordering rules and institutions. There are the deep rules and norms of sovereignty... There is a sprawling array of international institutions, regimes, treaties, agreements, protocols, and so forth. These governing arrangements cut across diverse realms, including security and arms control, the world economy, the environment and global commons, human rights, and political relations. Some of these domains of governance may have rules and institutions that narrowly reflect the interests of the hegemonic state, but most reflect negotiated outcomes based on a much broader set of interests.

Charles Glaser has disputed the analytical value of the concept of the LIO, arguing that the concept is so broad and vague that "almost any international situation qualifies as an international order, so long as its members accept the sovereignty norm." Some critics of the LIO, such as John Mearsheimer, have argued that liberal democracy promotion and hyper-globalization are elements of the LIO.

Jeff Colgan has characterized the liberal international order as the theme that unites multiple subsystems in the international system. These subsystems can experience drastic change without fundamentally changing the liberal international order.

== Debates ==
The debate about liberal international order has grown especially prominent in International Relations. Daniel Deudney and John Ikenberry list five components of this international order: security co-binding, in which great powers demonstrate restraint; the open nature of US hegemony and the dominance of reciprocal transnational relations; the presence of self-limiting powers like Germany and Japan; the availability of mutual gains due to "the political foundations of economic openness"; and the role of Western "civil identity." According to Charles Glaser, there are five key mechanisms in the LIO: "democracy, hierarchy built on legitimate authority, institutional binding, economic interdependence, and political convergence."

The more supportive views of scholars such as Ikenberry have drawn criticism from scholars who have examined the imperial and colonial legacies of liberal international institutions. The contributions of non-Western actors to the formation of the liberal international order have also recently gained attention from scholars advancing global International Relations theory. In the case of Latin America, for example, "From as far back as the 1860s, Latin American jurists have made prominent contributions to international jurisprudence, the ‘mortar’ that binds international order. [...] However, in other ways, historically the LIO has been—and remains—superficial in its reach in Latin America." According to Abrahamsen, Andersen, and Sending, the contemporary liberal international order includes the legacy of "southern actors" in Africa and Asia advocating the process of decolonization.

International organizations play a central role in the liberal order. The World Trade Organization, for example, creates and implements free trade agreements, while the World Bank provides aid to developing countries. The order is also premised on the notion that liberal trade and free markets will contribute to global prosperity and peace. The General Agreement on Tariffs and Trade, created two years after Germany's surrender in the Second World War, exemplifies this approach by limiting national trade policies and cutting tariffs to advance trade liberalism through non-discriminatory negotiations. However, critics also argue that free trade has sometimes led to social problems such as inequality and environmental degradation.

Post-Cold War, some consider international agreements on issues such as climate change, nuclear nonproliferation, and upholding initiatives in maritime law (UNCLOS) to constitute elements of the LIO. The European Union is often considered a major example of the liberal international order put into effect in terms of international agreements between the constituent countries.

Others argue that weak states played a central role in shaping the liberal international order. Marcos Tourinho argues that weak states used the three strategies of "resistance", "community" and "norms" to push back on U.S. dominance during the construction of the liberal international order, thus ensuring that the order did not just reflect U.S. interests. Martha Finnemore argues that unipolarity does not just entail a material superiority by the unipole, but also a social structure whereby the unipole maintains its status through legitimation, and institutionalization. In trying to obtain legitimacy from the other actors in the international system, the unipole necessarily gives those actors a degree of power. The unipole also obtains legitimacy and wards off challenges to its power through the creation of institutions, but these institutions also entail a diffusion of power away from the unipole. David Lake has argued along similar lines that legitimacy and authority are key components of international order. Abrahamsen suggested that middle powers also benefit from liberal internationalism. By investing in the maintenance of multilateral institutions, moderate powers can collectively advocate for their self-interest, counterbalancing great power politics. Supporting liberal internationalism is thus a form of realpolitik for middle powers.

Realist critics of the LIO include John Mearsheimer, Patrick Porter and Charles Glaser. Mearsheimer has argued that the LIO is bound to fail due to the pushback it faces internally within liberal states and externally by non-liberal states. Porter has argued that the LIO was actually a coercive order and that it was not liberal. Glaser has argued that the balance of power theory, bargaining theory and neo-institutional theories better explain NATO than mechanisms associated with the LIO.

Aaron McKeil of the London School of Economics finds realist criticism of liberal order insufficient. He argues that the alternative foreign policies offered by realists as "restraint" and "offshore balancing" would be more generative of proxy wars and would fail to offer the level of institutions required for managing great power competition and international challenges.

Inderjeet Parmar has argued that the LIO is "imperialism by another name" and that it promotes a Eurocentric, Americentric class-based, white elitist and racist hegemony over the rest of the world. According to Amitav Acharya, the LIO is often perceived outside of the West as a narrow ideological, economic, and strategic system that promotes the interests and culture of Western nations at the expense of their own local cultural languages, identities, and religions. Gellwitzki and Moulton complement these critiques by arguing that the LIO endures through institutionalized political myths, such as liberal values, sovereignty, and Western leadership. These confer legitimacy and guide state behavior, but while influential in the West, they have lost significance elsewhere.

John Dugard of the Leiden Law School has argued that the concept of the rules-based international order (RBO) operates in tension with international law and has often been used to advance Western interests. Dugard argues that RBO rests on tacit agreements between only a handful of Western states which other states have not endorsed and that its amorphous nature makes it easier for Western countries, particularly the United States, to justify special treatment for their actions when they violate international law. Jeremy Garlick of the Prague University of Business and Economics states that developing countries consider the United States to be applying double standards, as it promotes a rules-based international order while refusing to join agreements such as the UN Convention of the Law of the Seas.

Moreover, the governing institutions of the LIO continue to be increasingly challenged by different actors in present times. Particularly, Lesch, Zimmerman, and Deitelhoff have argued that both internal and external factors increasingly contest the core values of institutions of the LIO, such as the frequent reticence of members of the African Union ‘in their duty to prosecute, institutionalized in the ICC’. Similarly, the US challenge core institutional values of the LIO by contesting the prohibition of torture within the institutional setting of the Committee against Torture.

Apart from the judicial policy surrounding the ICC, institutions like the United Nations Security Council (UNSC) are heavily restrained in effectively intervening in conflicts, thus failing to actively protect the LIO and its members from potential threats. This is exemplified by the invasion of Ukraine by permanent member and veto-power of the UNSC, Russia. According to Terrence L. Chapman: ‘Anti-globalization forces and geopolitical rivalry have placed tremendous strain on international institutions [...]’. Further commenting on the role of the US as hegemon of the LIO that ‘[...] populist forces centered in the second Trump Administration may cause irreparable harm to these institutions and the U.S. role and status within them.

== Relations with individual countries ==
China under Xi Jinping, Russia under Vladimir Putin, the United States under Donald Trump (since late 2025), and international illiberal cooperation have been characterized as the most significant threats to the LIO.

=== United States ===
During the second presidency of Donald Trump, the United States has pursued a campaign to annex Greenland, which is part of Denmark and whose citizens are also citizens of the European Union. This has triggered a confrontation between the United States on one side, and Denmark, the European Union and several NATO members on the other.

On 3 January 2026, US forces detained the Venezuelan president Nicolas Maduro and his wife during a large-scale strike on the country’s capital, with Trump saying the US will "run" Venezuela and is "not afraid of boots on the ground". A week later, the US withdrew from 66 international organisations and Trump told the New York Times "I don’t need international law".

These actions have been described by academics and commentators as deliberate steps towards ending a rules-based world order in favour of great-power competition and a "predatory", rather than "liberal", hegemony by the United States.

In the widely discussed and acclaimed speech at the World Economic Forum in January 2026, Canadian Prime Minister Mark Carney, whose country has also faced Trump's threats of annexation, described a 'rupture' in the rules-based international order, saying the order has always been 'partially false' because the strongest powers exempt themselves when convenient. He stated that the world is now in an era of great power rivalry and that "great powers have begun using economic integration as weapons, tariffs as leverage, financial infrastructure as coercion, and supply chains as vulnerabilities to be exploited".

=== China ===
Some see China as a potential challenger to the liberal order. According to Darren Lim and John Ikenberry, China seeks an international order that protects its illiberal domestic political and economic model. Scholars cite initiatives such as the Asian Infrastructure Investment Bank and One Belt One Road Initiative as institutions that appear to compete with existing liberal international institutions. Van Niewenhuizen is categorical that Xi Jinping, then General Secretary of the Chinese Communist Party, seeks to supplant the LIO. According to political scientist Thomas Ambrosio, one aim of the Shanghai Cooperation Organisation was to ensure that liberal democracy could not gain ground in these countries, promoting Sinocentric authoritarian norms in Central Asia.

Rühlig asks in his March 2018 paper why China under Xi would seek to change a system by which it earns enormous profit.

Nisha Mary Mathew contends that China's relationship with Iran is driven not only by economics, but by a desire to see an international order not dominated by the U.S. and its allies.

China contends that the U.S. violates the international order, sometimes citing the 2003 United States invasion of Iraq as an example. On the 20th anniversary of the invasion of Iraq, the Ministry of Foreign Affairs of China stated that the US' bypassing of the UN Security Council violated the norms of the UN Charter, and "facts have demonstrated that any discourse on a 'rules based international order' that excludes the United Nations and international law is merely a façade for the principle of 'might makes right' and the law of the jungle."

Publishing in 2024, academics Xinru Ma and David C. Kang observe that U.S. scholars who contend that China does not accept the RBO rarely consider it an issue that the U.S. also often ignores these same rules.

=== Russia ===
Many scholars agree that the Russian Federation under Vladimir Putin seeks to undermine the liberal international order. Various viewpoints have been developed on the subject. The first is that Russia is a "revanchist power" seeking to completely overturn international diplomacy, the second is that Russia is a "defensive power" that seeks to push incremental change in the existing order, and the third is that Russia is an "aggressive isolationist", with Putin playing a "spoiler role" in international affairs to boost legitimacy domestically.

Political sociologist Larry Diamond argues that Putin's assault on liberal democracy is exemplified by the 2008 military intervention for the enclaves of Abkhazia and South Ossetia against independent Georgia, Russian support for Viktor Yanukovych in Ukraine, and the Russian military intervention in Ukraine by troops without insignia in 2014. Putin has been accused of giving financial support to far-right or national populist parties across Europe. For example, the National Front (now National Rally) obtained a 9 million euro loan from a Russian bank in 2014. Larry Diamond argues this influenced the policy of the National Front such as Marine Le Pen's support for the annexation of Crimea.

The 2022 Russian invasion of Ukraine and a widespread response against the invasion has led to renewed discussion of the liberal international order. Political scientist Lucan Way writes that the invasion has inadvertently strengthened the liberal international order in opposition, with the full-scale Russian invasion being a more conspicuously imperialistic challenge to sovereignty than smaller-scale frozen conflicts and political interferences. Way says that blocs such as the European Union will have more unified action while being currently pillars in the liberal international order. Samir Saran, head of the Delhi-based Observer Research Foundation, argues that renewing focus on the liberal international order creates new opportunities for the international community, yet he wishes the LIO to stay engaged with global issues following Europe's security crisis. Edward Luce says the invasion is a serious threat to the international order because, "should Putin succeed, it would legitimise the law of the jungle, where large countries can annex smaller ones with impunity." At the same time, Luce suggests different terminology should be used besides "liberal international order" due to what he says is the selective nature of diplomacy. Kori Schake argues that the Russian invasion has provoked a Western response which strengthens the transatlantic alliance, a main component of the LIO, yet has also involved a global response, with the largest partner being Japan. Schake suggests that Ukraine's own defense is a new strengthening element to the LIO, by showing a stark contrast between liberalism and authoritarianism.

John Mearsheimer argues that the US-led liberal international order emerged in 1991 after the break-up of the Soviet Union, when the United States became the only superpower in the world. The absence of any other power capable of challenging the US hegemony resulted in numerous illiberal activities (e.g. bombing on Yugoslavia in 1999, Afghanistan in 2001, Iraq in 2003–2011 and in 2014, Libya in 2011 and in 2015–2019) initiated by the United States under false pretences of protecting democracy and human rights. However, these wars have "failed to spread democracy or produce international stability", and instead they "antagonized the forces of nationalism and realist counter-hegemonic power politics". The Russian invasion of Ukraine in 2022 might be the first occasion that NATO and its allies did not achieve their objectives, and could signal the end of the unipolar moment of liberal hegemony and the beginning of a new international order, which may or may not be multipolar.

=== Illiberal cooperation ===
Commentators have also increasingly stressed the sophisticated networks of cooperation emerging between authoritarian and revisionist states. According to the Authoritarian Collaboration Index published by Action for Democracy, there have been over 72,000 instances of collaboration events between authoritarian, or authoritarian-leaning, states since January 2024. This collaboration has manifested itself in institutions such as the Collective Security Treaty Organisation, the Alliance of Sahel States, and the Shanghai Cooperation Organisation, which promote anti-democratic norms, disregard human rights, and provide warmongering states with economic and political support. In addition, the United States, under the second Trump administration, has also engaged in such collaboration, such as through its endorsement of various foreign illiberal political parties via forums such as the Conservative Political Action Conference. Nic Cheeseman and Alexander Cooley have highlighted these factors as trending towards an "illiberal international order".

== See also ==
- BRICS
- Cosmopolitan democracy
- European integration
- G7
- Global citizenship
- Hegemony
- Liberal democratic basic order
- Liberal institutionalism
- Liberalism (international relations)
- Major non-NATO ally
- New International Economic Order
- Perpetual Peace: A Philosophical Sketch
- Polarity (international relations)
- Sphere of influence
- The Fourth Political Theory
- Western culture
