= International order =

Structured relationships between international actors

In international relations, international order consists of patterned or structured relationships (such as polarity) between actors on the international level.

== Definition ==
David Lake, Lisa Martin, and Thomas Risse define "order" as "patterned or structured relationships among units."

Michael Barnett defines an international order as "patterns of relating and acting" derived from and maintained by rules, institutions, law, and norms. International orders have both a material and social component. Legitimacy (the generalized perception that actions are desirable, proper or appropriate) is essential to political orders. George Lawson has defined an international order as "regularized practices of exchange among discrete political units that recognize each other to be independent."

John Mearsheimer defines an international order as "an organized group of international institutions that help govern the interactions among the member states."

John Ikenberry, in After Victory (2001), defines a political order as "the governing arrangements among a group of states, including its fundamental rules, principles, and institutions."

Jeff Colgan has characterized international order as entailing multiple subsystems. These subsystems can experience drastic change without fundamentally changing the international order.

The United Nations has been characterized as a proxy for how states broadly perceive the international order.

== Liberal international order ==
The liberal international order (LIO) is a set of global, rule-based, structured relationships based on political liberalism, economic liberalism, and liberal internationalism since the late 1940s. More specifically, it entails international cooperation through multilateral institutions — like the United Nations (UN), World Trade Organization (WTO), and International Monetary Fund (IMF) — and is constituted by human equality (freedom, rule of law, and human rights), open markets, security cooperation, promotion of liberal democracy, and monetary cooperation. The order was established in the aftermath of World War II, led in large part by the United States.

The nature of the liberal international order, as well as its very existence, has been debated by scholars. The LIO has been credited with expanding free trade, increasing capital mobility, spreading democracy, promoting human rights, and collectively defending the West from the Soviet Union. These achievements have been enshrined in institutionalized political myths which confer legitimacy and coherence within Western contexts, even as violations erode their authority and diminish their significance elsewhere. The LIO facilitated unprecedented cooperation among the states of North America, Western Europe and Japan. Over time, the LIO facilitated the spread of economic liberalism to the rest of the world, as well as helped consolidate democracy in formerly fascist or communist countries.

Origins of the liberal international order have commonly been identified as the 1940s, usually starting in 1945. John Mearsheimer has dissented with this view, arguing that the LIO only arose after the end of the Cold War, since Liberal International Order is practically possible only during unipolar moment(s), while at the time of the Cold War the World was bipolar. Core founding members of the LIO include the states of North America, Western Europe, and Japan; these states form a security community. The characteristics of the LIO have varied over time. Some scholars refer to a Cold War variation of the LIO and a post-Cold War variation. The Cold War variation was primarily limited to the West and entailed weak global institutions, whereas the post-Cold War variation was worldwide in scope and entailed global institutions with "intrusive" powers.

Aspects of the liberal international order are challenged internally within liberal states by populism, protectionism, and nationalism. Scholars have argued that embedded liberalism (or the logics inherent in the Double Movement) are key to maintaining public support for the planks of the LIO; some scholars have raised questions whether aspects of embedded liberalism have been undermined, thus leading to a backlash against the LIO.

Externally, the liberal international order is challenged by authoritarian states, illiberal states, and states that are discontented with their roles in world politics. China, Russia, and more recently the United States have been characterized as prominent challengers to the LIO. Some scholars have argued that the LIO contains self-undermining aspects that could trigger backlash or collapse.

=== Connection to the postwar international legal system ===
The contemporary international legal system was established in the aftermath of World War II to prevent a third world war, and was largely built after the devastation of the two World Wars.

== See also ==
- United Nations System — UN-centered post-war international system established to prevent a third World War
- International relations (IR) — or International Studies (IS), the study of foreign affairs and global issues among states within the international system
- New world order (politics) — a post-Cold War political concept promulgated by Mikhail Gorbachev and George H.W. Bush
- World government — the notion of a single common political authority for all of humanity
- World-system — within the world-systems theory, a socioeconomic theory associated with thinkers such as Andre Gunder Frank, and Immanuel Wallerstein
- Neorealism in international relations — or structural realism, a theory of international relations, which includes:
  - Hegemonic stability theory (HST) — a theory that the international system is more likely to remain stable when a single nation-state is the dominant world power
- Power (international) — state power, including economic and military power
- Anarchy in international relations — a concept in international relations theory holding that the world system lacks a global authority
- Clash of Civilizations
- Global policeman
- World Federalist Movement/Institute for Global Policy
