= Fictitious commodities =

Concept in economics

The concept of fictitious commodities (or false commodities) originated in Karl Polanyi's 1944 book The Great Transformation and refers to anything treated as market commodity that is not created for the market, specifically land, labor, and money.

== Critique of commodification ==
For Polanyi, the effort by classical and neoclassical economics to make society subject to the free market was a utopian project and, as Polanyi scholars Fred Block and Margaret Somers claim, "When public goods and social necessities are treated as commodities produced for sale on the market rather than protected rights, social systems may become destabilised."

Polanyi's insight follows the Marxian notions of "commodification" and "commodity fetishism." Fetishism in anthropology refers to the attribution of spiritual or symbolic power to inanimate objects, such as totems. Marx used this concept to develop his theory of "commodity fetishism", describing how social relations between people may appear as relations between things.

David Bollier wrote that, according to Polanyi, "prior to the rise of the market as an ordering principle for society, politics, religion and social norms were the prevailing forces of governance. Land, labor and money itself were not regarded chiefly as commodities to be bought and sold. They were embedded in social relationships, and subject to the moral consideration, religious beliefs and community management." As Polanyi points out, these are actually "fictitious commodities" in the sense that they are not truly discrete "products." Treating land, labour, and money as commodities reflects their unique social and ecological roles, which can generate pressures such as environmental degradation or unemployment.

== See also ==
- Embeddedness
- Economistic fallacy
- Labour is not a commodity
