= Market fundamentalism =

Belief in an unregulated free market

Market fundamentalism, also known as free-market fundamentalism, is an ideology and a term applied to a strong belief in the ability of unregulated laissez-faire or free-market capitalist policies to solve most economic and social problems. It is often used as pejorative by critics of said beliefs.

== Origins and use ==
Palagummi Sainath believes Jeremy Seabrook, a journalist and campaigner, first used the term. The term was used by Jonathan Benthall in an Anthropology Today editorial in 1991 and by John Langmore and John Quiggin in their 1994 book Work for All.

According to economist John Quiggin, the standard features of economic fundamentalist rhetoric are dogmatic assertions combined with the claim that anyone who holds contrary views is not a real economist. However, Kozul-Wright states in his book The Resistible Rise of Market Fundamentalism that the "ineluctability of market forces" neoliberals and conservative politicians tend to stress and their confidence on a chosen policy rest on a "mixture of implicit and hidden assumptions, myths about the history of their own countries' economic development, and special interests camouflaged in their rhetoric of general good". The sociologists Fred L. Block and Margaret Somers use the label "because the term conveys the quasi-religious certainty expressed by contemporary advocates of market self-regulation".

Joseph Stiglitz used the term in his autobiographical essay in acceptance of Nobel Memorial Prize in Economic Sciences to criticize some International Monetary Fund policies, arguing: "More broadly, the IMF was advocating a set of policies which is generally referred to alternatively as the Washington consensus, the neo-liberal doctrines, or market fundamentalism, based on an incorrect understanding of economic theory and (what I viewed) as an inadequate interpretation of the historical data".

The theories that I (and others) helped develop explained why unfettered markets often not only do not lead to social justice, but do not even produce efficient outcomes. Interestingly, there has been no intellectual challenge to the refutation of Adam Smith's invisible hand: individuals and firms, in the pursuit of their self-interest, are not necessarily, or in general, led as if by an invisible hand, to economic efficiency.

— Joseph Stiglitz

Critics of laissez-faire policies have used the term to denote what they perceive as a misguided belief or deliberate deception that capitalist free markets provide the greatest possible equity and prosperity, or the view that any interference with the market process decreases social well-being. Users of the term include adherents of interventionist, mixed economy and protectionist positions as well as billionaires such as George Soros; economists such as Nobel Laureates Joseph Stiglitz and Paul Krugman; and Cornell University historian Edward E. Baptist. Soros suggests that market fundamentalism includes the belief that the best interests in a given society are achieved by allowing its participants to pursue their own financial self-interest with no restraint or regulatory oversight.

Critics claim that in modern society with worldwide conglomerates, or even merely large companies, the individual has no protection against fraud nor harm caused by products that maximize income by imposing externalities on the individual consumer as well as society. Historian Edward E. Baptist contends that "unrestrained domination of market forces can sometimes amplify existing forms of oppression into something more horrific" such as slavery and that "market fundamentalism doesn't always provide the best solution for every economic or social problem".

== See also ==
- Anarcho-capitalism
- "Authoritarian liberalism", a concept by Hermann Heller
- Casino capitalism
- Criticism of anarcho-capitalism
- Economic liberalism
- Globalization
- Late capitalism
- Neoliberalism
- Objectivism
- Profit motive
- Right-libertarianism
- Ultraliberalism

== Bibliography and further reading ==
- Albers, Detlev; Haeler, Stephen; Meyer, Henning, eds. (23 June 2006). Social Europe: A Continent's Answer to Market Fundamentalism. London: European Research Forum at London Metropolitan University. ISBN 978-0-9547448-3-0.
- Camerer, C. (1995): Individual Decision Making, in: Kagel, J.H. & Roth, A.E. (Eds.): Handbook of Experimental Economics, Princeton, Princeton University Press, 587–703. ISBN 978-0-691-05897-9
- Cox, Harvey (2016). The Market as God. Harvard University Press. ISBN 9780674659681
- French-Davis, Ricardo. Reforming Latin America's Economies: After Market Fundamentalism. Palgrave Macmillan, 2006. ISBN 1-4039-4945-X ISBN 978-1403949455
- Kelsey, Jane (1995). A Review of Economic Fundamentalism: The New Zealand Experiment - A World Model for Structural Adjustment?. Pluto Press. ISBN 1-86940-130-1
- Kozul-Wright, Richard. The Resistible Rise of Market Fundamentalism: The Struggle for Economic Development in a Global Economy. United Nations Conference on Trade and Development (UNCTAD), London: ZedBooks Ltd., 2007. ISBN 978-1-84277-636-0 ISBN 9781842776377
- Ritzer, George, ed. (2003). The Blackwell Companion to Major Social Theorists. Blackwell Companions to Sociology. Blackwell publishing. ISBN 978-0-631-20710-8.
- Soros, George (1998). The Crisis of Global Capitalism: The Crisis of Global Capitalism: Open Society Endangered. New York: PublicAffairs. ISBN 9781891620270. ISBN 978-1-891620-27-0
- Soros, George (2008). The New Paradigm for Financial Markets: The Credit Crisis of 2008 and What It Means. New York: PublicAffairs. ISBN 978-1-58648-683-9.
- Sunder, S (1995). "Experimental Asset Markets: A Survey". In Kagel, J.H.; Roth, A.E. (eds.). Handbook of Experimental Economics. Princeton: Princeton University Press. pp. 445–500. ISBN 978-0-691-05897-9
