= International system =

International system may refer to:

- International order, patterned or structured relationships between actors on the international level
- International System of Units, or SI (from French, Système international d'unités)

== See also ==
- International relations, an academic discipline
