= Liberal consensus =

Liberal consensus may refer to:

- Embedded liberalism – post World War II international ambitions to combine free market and social policies
- Liberal consensus – the post World War II consensus in American politics
- Post-war consensus – the post World War II consensus in United Kingdom politics
- Washington Consensus – also referred to as the neoliberal consensus
