= John Martin Gillroy =

American philosopher and academic

- Born: October 1, 1954 (age 72)
- Occupations: Academic, legal philosopher, author, researcher, policy/legal analyst
- Title: Professor

Academic background
- Education: PhD in Law and Legal Philosophy (2016, Cambridge), PhD in Political Philosophy and Public Policy (1985, University of Chicago)
- Alma mater: University of Cambridge, University of Chicago
- Thesis: Political Theory and Environmental Risk Regulation: A Kantian Foundation for Public Policy Choice (1985)

Academic work
- Discipline: Philosophy
- Sub-discipline: Public Policy, constitutional, environmental and public international law
- Institutions: Lehigh University, Wolfson College, Cambridge (Note: Gillroy is a junior fellow at Wolfson College.)
- Main interests: Political philosophy, public policy, law

John Martin Gillroy is an American philosopher, author, and academic. He is Professor of philosophy, law, and public policy emeritus at Lehigh University, and the Founding Director of its Environmental Policy Design Programs. He has also been founding Director of three other graduate programs and has held endowed faculty positions at Trinity College, Vermont Law School and Bucknell University, where he was John D. MacArthur Chair of Environmental law and Policy. He has also been a Visiting Fellow at Exeter College, Oxford, and a Visiting Professor of International Relations Simon Fraser University in Vancouver and at the Law Faculty of Queen's University at Kingston. Gillroy is known for his work in applying Enlightenment arguments about practical reason and moral agency to analyze contemporary law and policy, especially environmental risk policy and the evolution of the modern International legal system. He is the executive editor of Philosophy, Public Policy, and Transnational Law, a Palgrave-Macmillan book series.

In his 2013 book An Evolutionary Paradigm for International Law Philosophical Method, David Hume, and the Essence of Sovereignty, (Note: The book is part of a three books series.) Gillroy presented the latest refinement of his methodology of Philosophical-Policy And Legal Design (PPLD), which he has been teaching for over thirty years. His core course in PPLD has been featured on the American Philosophical Association’s Blog. PPLD emphasizes the use of Enlightenment Argument to integrate philosophy, public policy, and law into paradigms for application to the full range of contemporary public issues. Through this interdisciplinary approach, students, citizens, scholars and practitioners alike learn to analyze primary-source philosophical texts, convert them into a Paradigm Structure, develop persuasive policy-legal arguments, and apply them perspectives to real-world issues in policy and law.

== Bibliography ==
=== Select books ===
- Gillroy, J. An evolutionary paradigm for international law: philosophical method, David Hume, and the essence of sovereignty. Springer, 2013.
- Gillroy, John Martin. 2000. Justice & Nature: Kantian Philosophy, Environmental Policy, and the Law. Washington D.C.: Georgetown University Press.

=== Select edited books ===
- Gillroy, John Martin, and Maurice L. Wade, eds. The moral dimensions of public policy choice: Beyond the market paradigm. University of Pittsburgh Pre, 1992.

=== Select book chapters ===
- Gillroy, John Martin. "Ecosystem Policy and Law: A Philosophical Argument for the Anticipatory Regulation of Environmental Risk." In The Palgrave Handbook of Environmental Politics and Theory, pp. 259–298. Cham: Springer International Publishing, 2023.
- “Practical Reason And Authority Beyond The State” in Capps, Patrick, and Henrik Palmer Olsen (eds.) 2018. Legal Authority Beyond The State. Cambridge University Press.

=== Select articles ===
- “Toward An Environmental Law Of Essential Goods: A Philosophical And Legal Justification For ‘Ecological Contract’” 2018. International Journal of Tecnoethics. Vol. 9, No. 2.
- “A Proposal for ‘Philosophical Method' in Comparative and International Law” Pace International Law Review. (2009).
- "Justice-As-Sovereignty: David Hume & The Origins Of International Law” British Year Book of International Law. 79: 429–479 (2008).
- Gillroy, John Martin. "Making public choices: Kant’s justice from autonomy as an alternative to Rawls’ justice as fairness." (2000): 44–72.
- Gillroy, John Martin. "Kantian Ethics and Environmental Policy Argument: Autonomy, Ecosystem Integrity, and Our Duties to Nature." Ethics and the Environment (1998): 131–155.
- Gillroy, John Martin. "Adjudication Norms, Dispute Settlement Regimes and International Tribunals: The Status of Environmental Sustainability in International Jurisprudence." Stan. J. Int'l L. 42 (2006): 1.
- Gillroy, John Martin. "The ethical poverty of cost-benefit methods: Autonomy, efficiency and public policy choice." Policy Sciences 25, no. 2 (1992): 83–102.
