= The Great Transformation (book) =

1944 book by Karl Polanyi

- First UK edition (publ. Victor Gollancz, 1945)
- Author: Karl Polanyi
- Language: English
- Subject: Market economy; Social theory; Economic theory
- Publisher: Farrar & Rinehart
- Publication date: 1944
- Publication place: United States
- Followed by: Trade and Markets in the Early Empires (1957)

The Great Transformation is a book by Karl Polanyi, a Hungarian political economist. First published in 1944 by Farrar & Rinehart, it deals with the social and political upheavals that took place in England during the rise of the market economy. Polanyi contends that the modern market economy and the modern nation-state should be understood not as discrete elements but as a single human invention, which he calls the "Market Society".

A distinguishing characteristic of the "Market Society" is that humanity's economic mentalities have been changed. Prior to this, people based their economies on reciprocity and redistribution across personal and communal relationships. As a consequence of industrialization and increasing state influence, competitive markets were created that undermined these previous social tendencies, replacing them with formal institutions that aimed to promote a self-regulating market economy. The expansion of capitalist institutions with an economically liberal mindset not only changed laws but also fundamentally altered humankind's economic relations; prior to this, markets played a very minor role in human affairs and were not even capable of setting prices because of their diminutive size. It was only after industrialization and the onset of greater state control over newly created market institutions that the myth of human nature's propensity toward rational free trade became widespread. However, Polanyi asserts instead that "man's economy, as a rule, is submerged in his social relationships," and he therefore proposes an alternative ethnographic economic approach called "substantivism", in opposition to "formalism", both terms coined by Polanyi in future work.

On a broader theoretical level, The Great Transformation argues that markets cannot solely be understood through economic theory. Rather, markets are embedded in social and political logics, which makes it necessary for economic analysts to take into account politics when trying to understand the economy. For this reason, The Great Transformation is a key work in the fields of political economy and international political economy.

== History ==
Polanyi began writing The Great Transformation in England in the late 1930s. He completed the book in the United States during World War II. He set out to explain the economic and social collapse of the 19th century, as well as the transformations that Polanyi had witnessed during the 20th century.

== General argument ==
Polanyi argued that the development of the modern state went hand in hand with the development of modern market economies and that these two changes were inextricably linked in history. Essential to the change from a premodern economy to a market economy was the altering of human economic mentalities away from their grounding in local social relationships and institutions, and into transactions idealized as "rational" and set apart from their previous social context. Prior to the Market Society, markets had a very limited role in society and were confined almost entirely to long-distance trade. As Polanyi wrote, "the same bias which made Adam Smith's generation view primeval man as bent on barter and truck induced their successors to disavow all interest in early man, as he was now known not to have indulged in those laudable passions."

The modern market economy was forced by the powerful modern state, which was needed to push changes in social structure, and in what aspects of human nature were amplified and encouraged, which allowed for a competitive capitalist economy to emerge. For Polanyi, these changes implied the destruction of the basic social order that had reigned throughout pre-modern history. Central to the change was that factors of production, such as land and labor, would now be sold on the market at market-determined prices instead of allocated according to tradition, redistribution, or reciprocity. This was both a change of human institutions and human nature.

His empirical case in large part relied upon analysis of the Speenhamland laws, which he saw not only as the last attempt of the squirearchy to preserve the traditional system of production and social order but also a self-defensive measure on the part of society that mitigated the disruption of the most violent period of economic change. Polanyi also remarks that the pre-modern economies of China, the Incan Empire, the Indian Empires, Babylon, Greece, and the various kingdoms of Africa operated on principles of reciprocity and redistribution with a very limited role for markets, especially in settling prices or allocating the factors of production. The book also presented his belief that market society is unsustainable because it is fatally destructive to human nature and the natural contexts it inhabits.

Polanyi attempted to turn the tables on the orthodox liberal account of the rise of capitalism by arguing that "laissez-faire was planned", whereas social protectionism was a spontaneous reaction to the social dislocation imposed by an unrestrained free market. He argues that the construction of a "self-regulating" market necessitates the separation of society into economic and political realms. Polanyi does not deny that the self-regulating market has brought "unheard of material wealth", but he suggests that this is too narrow a focus. The market, once it considers land, labor and money as fictitious commodities, and including them "means to subordinate the substance of society itself to the laws of the market."

This, he argues, results in massive social dislocation, and spontaneous moves by society to protect itself. In effect, Polanyi argues that once the free market attempts to separate itself from the fabric of society, social protectionism is society's natural response, which he calls the "double movement." Polanyi did not see economics as a subject closed off from other fields of enquiry, indeed he saw economic and social problems as inherently linked. He ended his work with a prediction of a socialist society, noting, "after a century of blind 'improvement', man is restoring his 'habitation.'"

=== Gold standard ===
According to James Ashley Morrison, Polanyi offers a prominent argument in the field of political economy for Britain's decision to depart from the gold standard. Polanyi argues that Britain went off the gold standard due to both deteriorating international economic conditions and pressures from labor, which had grown stronger over time. In 1931, the Labour Party found itself faced with a dire dilemma: either reduce social services or let currency exchange rates collapse. Since it could not decide on one alternative or the other, there was a government crisis, and the "traditional parties" decided both to cut social services and to abolish the gold standard. Labor opposed the gold standard because maintaining it meant that the British government had to implement austerity. James Ashley Morrison found many later explanations for the collapse of the gold standard very much resemble the Polanyian argument, which he summarized as follows:

Developments in the global economy, particularly after World War I, made maintaining the gold standard increasingly painful. Diminished international cooperation combined with Britain’s relative economic decline to exacerbate its difficulties. At the same time, a newly empowered working class harnessed evolving “social purpose” to resist the austerity necessary to defend gold.

== Before the market society ==
Based on Bronislaw Malinowski's ethnological work on the Kula ring exchange in the Trobriand Islands, Polanyi makes the distinction between markets as an auxiliary tool for ease of exchange of goods and market societies. Market societies are those where markets are the paramount institution for the exchange of goods through price mechanisms. Polanyi argues that there are three general types of economic systems that existed before the rise of a market society: reciprocity, redistribution, and householding:

1. Reciprocity: exchange of goods is based on reciprocal exchanges between social entities. On a macro level, this would include the production of goods to gift to other groups.
2. Redistribution: trade and production is focused to a central entity such as a tribal leader or feudal lord and then redistributed to members of their society.
3. Householding: economies where production is centered on individual households. Family units produce food, textile goods, and tools for their own use and consumption.

These three forms were not mutually exclusive, nor were they mutually exclusive of markets for the exchange of goods. The main distinction is that these three forms of economic organization were based around the social aspects of the society they operated in and were explicitly tied to those social relationships. Polanyi argued that these economic forms depended on the social principles of symmetry, centricity, and autarchy (self-sufficiency). Markets existed as an auxiliary avenue for the exchange of goods that were otherwise not obtainable.

== Reception ==
Following its publication in 1944, The Great Transformation occupied a marginal position in the social sciences for decades. The polarized intellectual climate of the Cold War, which framed economic debate as a choice between capitalism and socialism, left little space for Polanyi's institutional analysis. The book's readership began to expand in the 1980s, when the rise of neoliberal globalization closely recalled the nineteenth-century market liberalism Polanyi had critiqued. Sociologist Mark Granovetter's influential 1985 article on "embeddedness" drew on Polanyi's framework and helped establish the concept as foundational to the field of economic sociology. According to Google data, citations of "Karl Polanyi" grew rapidly from the early 1980s onward, a pace that accelerated further in the 2010s.

The book has influenced scholars such as Marshall Sahlins, Immanuel Wallerstein, James C. Scott, E.P. Thompson, and Douglass North. John Ruggie, who called the Great Transformation a "magisterial work", was influenced by the work in coining the term Embedded liberalism for the Bretton Woods system of the post-World War II period.

The sociologists Fred L. Block and Margaret Somers argue that Polanyi's analysis could help explain why the resurgence of free market ideas has resulted in "such manifest failures as persistent unemployment, widening inequality, and the severe financial crises that have stressed Western economies over the past forty years." They suggest that "the ideology that free markets can replace government is just as utopian and dangerous" as the idea that Communism will result in the withering away of the state.

In Toward an Anthropological Theory of Value: The False Coin of Our Own Dreams, anthropologist David Graeber offers compliments to Polanyi's text and theories. Graeber attacks formalists and substantivists alike: "those who start by looking at society as a whole are left, like the Substantivists, trying to explain how people are motivated to reproduce society; those who start by looking at individual desires, like the formalists, unable to explain why people chose to maximize some things and not others (or otherwise to account for questions of meaning)." While appreciative of Polanyi's attack on formalism, Graeber attempts to move beyond ethnography and towards understanding how individuals find meaning in their actions, synthesizing insights of Marcel Mauss, Karl Marx, and others.

In parallel with Polanyi's account of markets being made internal to society as a result of state intervention, Graeber argues the transition to credit-based markets from societies with separated "spheres of exchange" in gift giving was likely the accidental byproduct of state or temple bureaucracy (temple in the case of Sumer). Graeber also notes that the criminalization of debt supplemented the enclosure movements in the destruction of English communities, since credit between community members had originally reinforced communal ties prior to state intervention:

The criminalization of debt, then, was the criminalization of the very basis of human society. It cannot be overemphasized that in a small community, everyone normally was both lender and borrower. One can only imagine the tensions and temptations that must have existed in a community—and communities, much though they are based on love, in fact, because they are based on love, will always also be full of hatred, rivalry and passion—when it became clear that with sufficiently clever scheming, manipulation, and perhaps a bit of strategic bribery, they could arrange to have almost anyone they hated imprisoned or even hanged.

— David Graeber, Debt: The First 5000 Years

Economist Joseph Stiglitz favors Polanyi's account of market liberalization, arguing that the failures of "Shock Therapy" in Russia and the failures of IMF reform packages echo Polanyi's arguments. Stiglitz also summarizes the difficulties of "market liberalization" in that it requires unrealistic "flexibility" amongst the poor.

Charles Kindleberger praised the book, saying it "is a useful corrective to the economic interpretation of the world, and should be read more and more by economists, particularly those of the Chicago school." He did however propose that he would "continue to quote Polanyi. Though not necessarily to believe everything he says."

Polanyi's argument is often cited as the "Polanyian moment", "Polanyi Moment" or "Polanyi's moment", which indicates the time when social protectionism starts to surpass marketization and thus reversing the direction of the double movement. This term has been used to describe the situation after the Great Recession in 2008 the COVID-19 pandemic. Gemici compared the Polanyi Moment to the Minsky moment, the moment of a sudden collapse in the market.

=== Criticism ===
Rutger Bregman, writing for Jacobin, criticized Polanyi's account of the Speenhamland system as reliant on several myths (increased poverty, increased population growth and increased unrest, as well as "'the pauperization of the masses,' who 'almost lost their human shape';" "basic income did not introduce a floor, he contended, but a ceiling") and the flawed Royal Commission into the Operation of the Poor Laws 1832.

Both Bregman and Corey Robin credited Polanyi's view with Richard Nixon moving away from a proposed basic income system because Polanyi was heavily quoted in a report by Nixon's aide, Martin Anderson, then ultimately providing arguments for various reductions in the welfare state introduced by Ronald Reagan, Bill Clinton and George W. Bush.

Economic historians (e.g. Douglass North) have criticized Polanyi's account of the origins of capitalism. Polanyi's account of reciprocity and redistributive systems is inherently changeless and thus cannot explain the emergence of the more specific form of modern capitalism in the 19th century.

Deirdre McCloskey has criticized several aspects of the Great Transformation. She notes that Polanyi's account of "pre-market" societies are inconsistent with anthropological evidence which suggests these societies were not as equitable, socially stable, and successful as Polanyi makes them appear to be. McCloskey notes that market-based societies are not a nascent invention, as Polanyi claims, but that they extend further back in time. She also criticizes Polanyi's conceptualization of self-regulating markets whereby any and all government intervention in the markets means the markets are no longer markets.

The Great Transformation has been criticized for underplaying power and class relations in its analysis. Polanyi argued, "class interests offer only a limited explanation of long-run movements in society." He argued that while humans are "naturally conditioned by economic factors", human motives are only rarely determined by "material want-satisfaction"; rather, human motives were more social (e.g. desire for security and status) than material.

== Contents ==
- Part One The International System
  - Chapter 1. The Hundred Years' Peace
  - Chapter 2. Conservative Twenties, Revolutionary Thirties
- Part Two Rise and Fall of Market Economy
- I. Satanic Mill
  - Chapter 3. "Habitation versus Improvement"
  - Chapter 4. Societies and Economic Systems
  - Chapter 5. Evolution of the Market Pattern
  - Chapter 6. The Self-regulating Market and the Fictitious Commodities: Labor, Land, and Money
  - Chapter 7. Speenhamland, 1795
  - Chapter 8. Antecedents and Consequences
  - Chapter 9. Pauperism and Utopia
  - Chapter 10. Political Economy and the Discovery of Society
- II. Self-Protection of Society
  - Chapter 11. Man, Nature, and Productive Organization
  - Chapter 12. Birth of the Liberal Creed
  - Chapter 13. Birth of the Liberal Creed (Continued): Class Interest and Social Change
  - Chapter 14. Market and Man
  - Chapter 15. Market and Nature
  - Chapter 16. Market and Productive Organization
  - Chapter 17. Self-Regulation Impaired
  - Chapter 18. Disruptive Strains
- Part Three Transformation in Progress
  - Chapter 19. Popular Government and Market Economy
  - Chapter 20. History in the Gear of Social Change
  - Chapter 21. Freedom in a Complex Society
- Notes on Sources
1. Balance of Power
2. Hundred Years' Peace
3. The Snapping of the Golden Thread
4. Swings of the Pendulum after World War I
5. Finance and Peace
6. Selected References to "Societies and Economic Systems"
7. Selected References to "Evolution of the Market Pattern"
8. The Literature of Speenhamland
9. Speenhamland and Vienna
10. Why Not Whitbread's Bill?
11. Disraeli's "Two Nations" and the Problem of Colored Races
12. Additional Note: Poor Law and the Organization of Labor

== Editions ==
The book was originally published in the United States in 1944 and then in England in 1945 as The Origins of Our Time. It was reissued by Beacon Press as a paperback in 1957 and as a 2nd edition with a foreword by Nobel Prize-winning economist Joseph Stiglitz in 2001.

- Polanyi, K. (1944). The Great Transformation. Foreword by Robert M. MacIver. New York: Farrar & Rinehart.
- Polanyi, K. (1957). The Great Transformation. Foreword by Robert M. MacIver. Boston: Beacon Press. ISBN 9780807056790.
- Polanyi, K. (2001). The Great Transformation: The Political and Economic Origins of Our Time, 2nd ed. Foreword by Joseph E. Stiglitz; introduction by Fred Block. Boston: Beacon Press. ISBN 9780807056431.
- Polanyi, K. (2024). The Great Transformation: The Political and Economic Origins of Our Time, with introduction by Gareth Dale. Penguin Books. ISBN 9780241685556

== See also ==
- Capitalist mode of production
- Economic anthropology
- Economic sociology
- Political economy
- Formalist–substantivist debate
