= Karl Polanyi =

Economist, philosopher and historian (1886–1964)

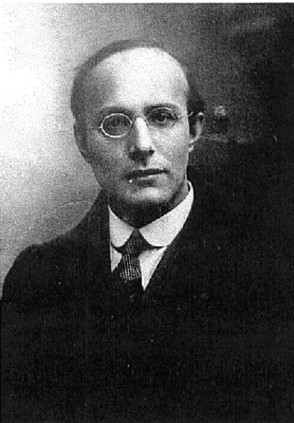
- Polanyi, c. 1918
- Born: 25 October 1886; Vienna, Austria-Hungary
- Died: 23 April 1964 (aged 77); Pickering, Ontario, Canada
- Spouse: Ilona Duczynska (m. 1923)
- Children: Kari Polanyi Levitt
- Relatives: Michael Polanyi (brother); John Polanyi (nephew); Eva Zeisel (niece)

Academic background
- Education: Minta Gymnasium; University of Budapest; Franz Joseph University (PhD)
- Doctoral advisor: Bódog Somló
- Other advisor: Gyula Pikler
- Influences: Robert Owen, Bronisław Malinowski, G. D. H. Cole, Richard Tawney, Richard Thurnwald, Karl Marx, Aristotle, Karl Bücher, Heinrich Schurtz, Ferdinand Tönnies, Adam Smith, Alfred Radcliffe-Brown, Werner Sombart, Max Weber, György Lukács, Carl Menger

Academic work
- Discipline: Economic sociology, economic history, economic anthropology, Philosophy
- School or tradition: Historical school of economics
- Notable ideas: Embeddedness, Double Movement, fictitious commodities, economistic fallacy, the formalist–substantivist debate (substantivism)
- Influenced: Fred L. Block, Margaret Somers, Kari Polanyi Levitt, Michel Aglietta, David Graeber

Karl Paul Polanyi (/poʊˈlænji/; Hungarian: Polányi Károly [ˈpolaːɲi ˈkaːroj]; 25 October 1886 – 23 April 1964) was an Austro-Hungarian economic historian, economic sociologist, and politician, best known for his book The Great Transformation, which questions the conceptual validity of self-regulating markets. In his writings, Polanyi advances the concept of the Double Movement, which refers to the dialectical process of marketization and push for social protection against that marketization. He argues that market-based societies in modern Europe were not inevitable but historically contingent. Polanyi is remembered best as the originator of substantivism, a cultural version of economics, which emphasizes the way economies are embedded in society and culture. This opinion is counter to mainstream economics but is popular in anthropology, economic history, economic sociology and political science.

Polanyi's approach to the ancient economies has been applied to a variety of cases, such as Pre-Columbian America and ancient Mesopotamia, although its utility to the study of ancient societies in general has been questioned. Polanyi's The Great Transformation became a model for historical sociology. His theories eventually became the foundation for the economic democracy movement.

Polanyi was active in politics, and helped found the National Citizens' Radical Party in 1914, serving as its secretary. He fled Hungary for Vienna in 1919 when the right-wing authoritarian regime of Admiral Horthy seized power. He fled Vienna for London in 1933 when Adolf Hitler came to power in Germany and fascism was ascendant in Austria. After years of unsuccessfully seeking employment at universities in the United Kingdom, he moved to the United States in 1940 where he joined the faculty at Bennington College and later taught at Columbia University.

== Early life and education ==
Karl Polanyi was born in Vienna and raised in Budapest by a German‑speaking Jewish family assimilating into the secular middle class. His younger brother was Michael Polanyi, a philosopher, and his niece was Eva Zeisel, a world-renowned ceramist. He was born in Vienna, at the time the capital of the Austro-Hungarian Empire. His father, Mihály Pollacsek, was a railway entrepreneur. Mihály never changed the name Pollacsek, and is buried in the Jewish cemetery in Budapest. Mihály died in January 1905, which was an emotional shock to Karl, and he commemorated the anniversary of Mihály's death throughout his life. Karl and Michael Polanyi's mother was Cecília Wohl. The name change to Polanyi was made by Karl and his siblings.

Polanyi was well educated despite the ups and downs of his father's fortune, and he immersed himself in Budapest's active intellectual and artistic scene. He attended the Minta Gymnasium. As a high school student, he joined the Society of Socialist Students, set up by his elder brother Adolf.

Following his graduation in 1904, he enrolled at the Law School of the University of Budapest and soon came under the influence of the legal philosopher Gyula Pikler. In 1907, he participated in a successful defence of Pikler against a campaign by the conservative university circles intended to force the scholar's resignation. He was then elected the first president of the freethinking Galileo Circle, founded by 256 of Pikler's student supporters in November 1908. Under his leadership, the Circle, dedicated to combating metaphysics in pursuit of positive science and moral purification of society, sponsored an influential lecture series, with speakers including Max Adler, Eduard Bernstein, Sándor Ferenczi, Robert Michels, Wilhelm Ostwald, and Werner Sombart. Polanyi himself developed a particular interest in the thought of Wilhelm Ostwald and Ernst Mach during this time, and engaged with other notable thinkers, such as his friend György Lukács, Oszkár Jászi, and Karl Mannheim. He graduated from the Franz Joseph University in Kolozsvár in June 1909, with a doctorate in law obtained under the supervision of Bódog Somló.

In 1910, he resigned the presidency of the Galileo Circle to lead the Committee for Workers' Education. After completing his law examinations, he was called to the bar in 1912. He co-edited the Galileo Circle's journal Szabadgondolat (Free Thought) from May 1913. In June 1914, he helped Oszkár Jászi found the National Citizens' Radical Party of Hungary and served as its secretary.

== Early career ==
Polanyi was a second lieutenant in the Austro-Hungarian Army in World War I, in active service with the cavalry at the Russian Front in Galicia until he was hospitalized due to his injuries in Budapest in 1917. Polanyi supported the republican government of Mihály Károlyi and its Social Democratic regime of 1918–1919. The republic was short-lived, with communist Béla Kun toppling the Karolyi government to create the Hungarian Soviet Republic. Polanyi advocated for dialogue with the communists while criticising them harshly. He soon left Hungary for Vienna in order to undergo medical treatment, and did not return after the Kun government was overthrown by the right-wing authoritarian regime of Admiral Horthy.

== In Vienna ==
From 1924 to 1933, he was employed as a senior editor of the prestigious Der Österreichische Volkswirt (The Austrian Economist) magazine. It was at this time that he first began criticizing the Austrian school of economics, which he felt created abstract models that lost sight of the organic, interrelated reality of economic processes. Polanyi himself was attracted to Fabianism and the works of G. D. H. Cole. It was also during this period that Polanyi first developed an interest in Christian socialism.

Polanyi married the communist revolutionary Ilona Duczyńska, who was of Polish-Hungarian background. Their daughter Kari Polanyi Levitt carried on the family tradition of academic economic research.

== In London ==
Polanyi was asked to resign from Der Oesterreichische Volkswirt because the liberal publisher of the journal could not keep on a prominent socialist after the accession of Hitler to office in January 1933 and the suspension of the Austrian parliament by the rising tide of clerical fascism in Austria. He left for London in 1933, where he earned a living as a journalist and tutor and obtained a position as a lecturer for the Workers' Educational Association in 1936. His lecture notes contained the research for what later became The Great Transformation. However, he would not start writing this work until 1940, when he moved to Vermont to take up a position at Bennington College. Polanyi had for many years sought employment at British universities but was unsuccessful. The book was published in 1944, to great acclaim. In it, Polanyi described the enclosure process in England and the creation of the contemporary economic system at the beginning of the 19th century.

== United States and Canada ==
Polanyi joined the staff of Bennington College in 1940, teaching a series of five timely lectures on the "Present Age of Transformation". The lectures "The Passing of the 19th Century", "The Trend Towards an Integrated Society", "The Breakdown of the International System", "Is America an Exception?", and "Marxism and the Inner History of the Russian Revolution" took place during the early stages of World War II. Polanyi participated in Bennington's Humanism Lecture Series (1941) and Bennington College's Lecture Series (1943) where his topic was "Jean Jacques Rousseau: Or Is a Free Society Possible?"

After the war, Polanyi received a teaching position at Columbia University (1947–1953). However, his wife, Ilona Duczyńska (1897–1978), had a background as a former communist, which made gaining an entrance visa in the United States impossible. As a result, they moved to Canada, and Polanyi commuted to New York City. In the early 1950s, Polanyi received a large grant from the Ford Foundation to study the economic systems of ancient empires.

Having described the emergence of the modern economic system, Polanyi now sought to understand how "the economy" emerged as a distinct sphere in the distant past. His seminar at Columbia drew several famous scholars and influenced a generation of teachers, resulting in the 1957 volume Trade and Market in the Early Empires. Polanyi continued to write in his later years and established a new journal entitled Coexistence. In Canada he lived in Pickering, Ontario, where he died in 1964.

== Selected works ==
- Dalton, George, ed. Primitive, Archaic, and Modern Economics: Essays of Karl Polanyi (New York: Doubleday & Company, 1968); collected essays and selections from his work.
- Pearson, Harry W., ed. The Livelihood of Man (Academic Press, 1977)
- Polanyi, Karl. The Great Transformation: The Political and Economic Insights of Our Time (Boston: Beacon Press. 1944) ISBN 0-8070-5679-0
- Polanyi, Karl, Conrad M. Arensberg, and Harry W. Person, eds. Trade and Market in the Early Empires (Glencoe, Ill.: The Free Press, 1957)
- Polanyi, Karl. Dahomey and the Slave Trade: An Analysis of an Archaic Economy (Seattle: University of Washington Press, 1966).
- Polanyi, Karl. For a New West: Essays, 1919–1958 (Polity Press, 2014), ISBN 978-0745684444

=== Articles ===
- "Socialist Accounting" (1922)
- "The Essence of Fascism" (1933–1934); article
- "Universal Capitalism or Regional Planning?", The London Quarterly of World Affairs, vol. 10 (3) (1945)

== See also ==
- Michael Polanyi (brother)
- John Polanyi (nephew)
- Eva Zeisel (niece)
