= Eva Zeisel =

Hungarian-American ceramicist (1906–2011)

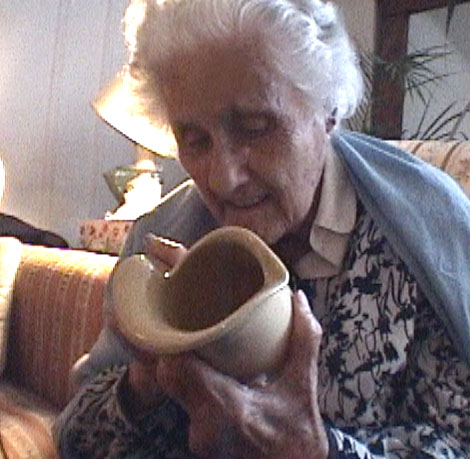
- Zeisel in 2001
- Born: November 13, 1906; Budapest, Hungary
- Died: December 30, 2011 (aged 105); New City, New York, US
- Education: Hungarian Royal Academy of Fine Arts
- Occupation: Industrial designer
- Spouse: Hans Zeisel
- Children: 2
- Relatives: Karl Polanyi (uncle); Michael Polanyi (uncle); Ilona Duczynska (aunt); Kari Polanyi Levitt (cousin); John Polanyi (cousin)

Eva Striker Zeisel (born Éva Amália Striker, November 13, 1906 – December 30, 2011) was a Hungarian-born American industrial designer known for her ceramics, primarily from the period after she immigrated to the United States. Her forms are often abstractions of the natural world and human relationships. Zeisel was a self-declared "maker of useful things" and her work is held in many museum collections.

== Life and career ==
=== Early life and family ===
Zeisel was born in Budapest, Hungary, in 1906 to a wealthy, highly educated assimilated Jewish family. Her mother, Laura Polányi Striker, a historian, was the first woman to get a PhD from the University of Budapest. Striker's work on Captain John Smith's adventures in Hungary added fundamentally to our understanding and appreciation of his reliability as a narrator. Zeisel's uncles were Karl Polanyi, a sociologist and economist, and Michael Polanyi, a physical chemist and philosopher of science.

=== Education ===
Despite her family's intellectual prominence in the field of science, Zeisel always felt a deep attraction towards art. At 17, she entered Budapest's Magyar Képzőművészeti Akadémia (Hungarian Royal Academy of Fine Arts) as a painter. To support her painting, she decided to pursue a more practical profession and apprenticed herself to Jakob Karapancsik, the last pottery master in the medieval guild system. From him she learned ceramics. She was the first woman to qualify as a journeyman in the Hungarian Guild of Chimney Sweeps, Oven Makers, Roof Tilers, Well Diggers, and Potters. After graduating as a journeyman, she found work at the Hansa-Kust-Keramik, a ceramic workshop in Hamburg, Germany.

=== Early career, imprisonment, and emigration ===
In 1928, Zeisel became the designer for the Schramberger Majolikafabrik in the Black Forest region of Germany where she worked for about two years creating many playfully geometric designs for dinnerware, tea sets, vases, inkwells and other ceramic items. Her designs at Schramberg were largely influenced by modern architecture. In addition, she had just learned to draft with compass and ruler and was proud to put them to use. In 1930, Zeisel moved to Berlin, designing for the Carstens factories. During this period, she met the physicist Alexander Weissberg, who later worked in Kharkov. They became engaged in 1932.

After almost two years of a glamorous life among intellectuals and artists in decadent Berlin, Zeisel decided to visit the Soviet Union in 1932, where she would stay for 5 years.

At the age of 29, after several jobs in the Russian ceramics industry—inspecting factories in Ukraine as well as designing for the Lomonosov and Dulevo factories—Zeisel was named artistic director of the Russian China and Glass Trust. On May 26, 1936, while living in Moscow, Zeisel was arrested. She had been falsely accused of participating in an assassination plot against Joseph Stalin. She was held in prison for 16 months, 12 of which were spent in solitary confinement. In September 1937, she was deported to Vienna, Austria. Some of her prison experiences form the basis for Darkness at Noon, the anti-Stalinist novel written by her childhood friend, Arthur Koestler. It was while in Vienna that she re-established contact with her future husband Hans Zeisel, later a legal scholar, statistician, and professor at The University of Chicago. A few months after her arrival in Vienna the Nazis invaded, and Zeisel took the last train out. She and Hans met up in England where they married and sailed for the US with $67 between them.

=== US career, 1937–1960s ===
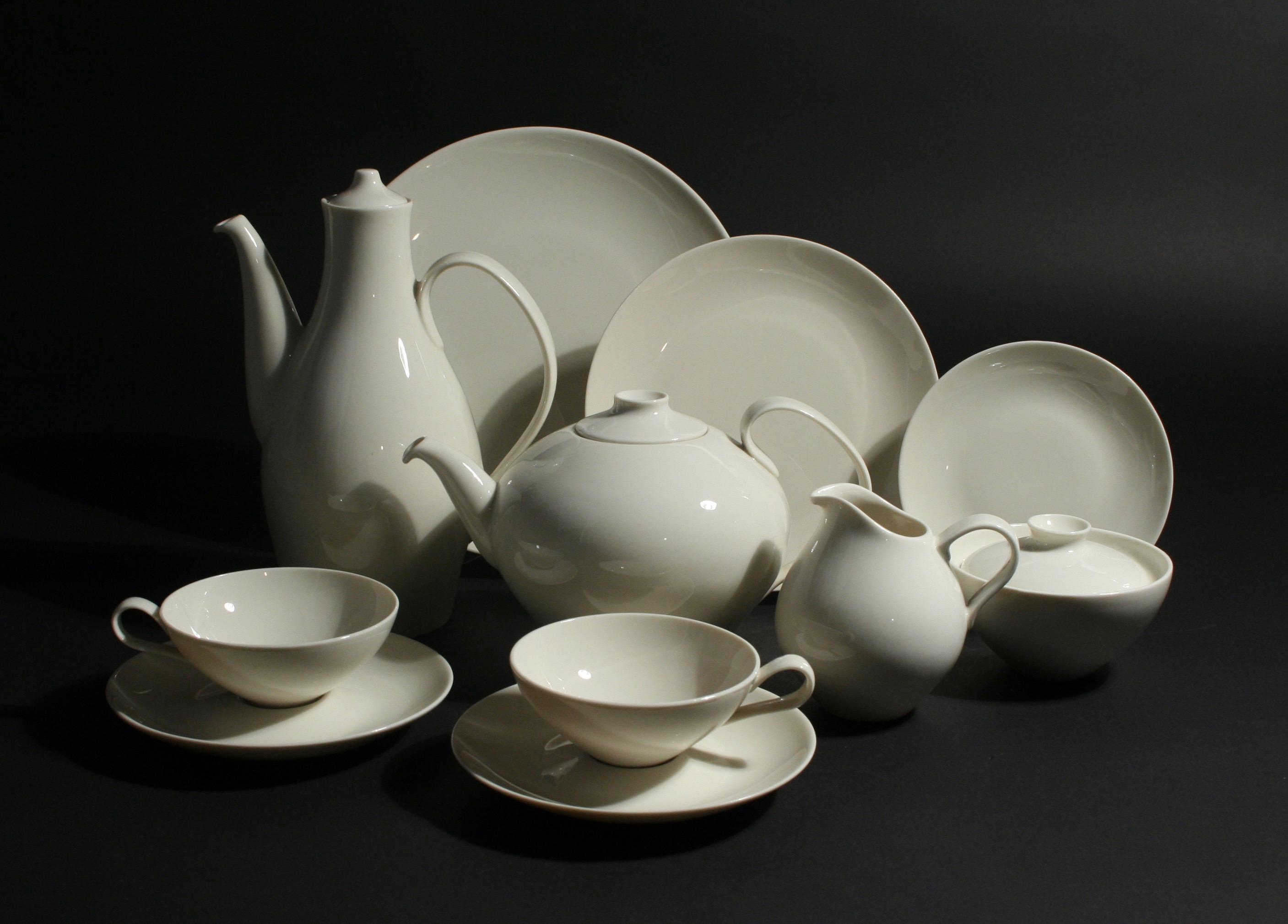
Zeisel's Castleton "Museum" dinnerware series commissioned by MoMA in 1942.

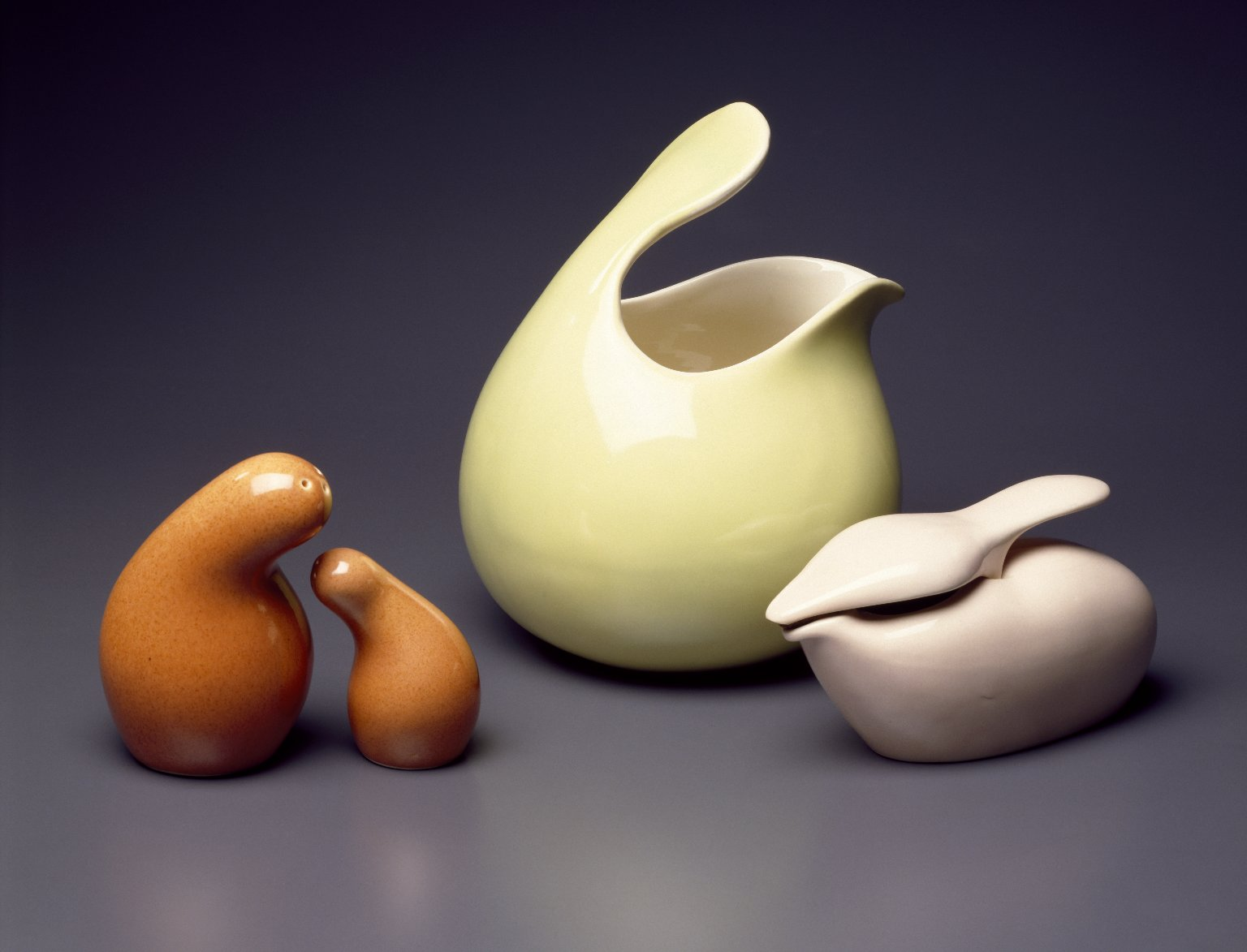
Some of Zeisel's ceramic pieces designed for Red Wing Pottery's "Town and Country" dinner service (1947). This set includes a "mother and child" salt and pepper shakers, yellow pitcher, and a white baby oil pourer that exemplify her organic, curving forms.

When Zeisel arrived in the US, she had to reestablish her reputation as a designer. Beginning in 1937, she taught at Pratt Institute in New York. She and her students created designs for the Bay Ridge Specialty Company including Stratoware (a rare, short-lived line made for Sears), designed by student Frances Blod, under Zeisel'ls supervision.

In 1942, Zeisel was commissioned by the Museum of Modern Art and Castleton China to design a set of modern, porcelain, undecorated china that would be worthy of exhibition at MoMA, to be produced for sale by Castleton. The resulting exhibition, "New Shapes in Modern China Designed by Eva Zeisel," ran from April 17 to June 9, 1946, and was the first one-woman exhibition at MoMA. It was received with wide praise, but because of wartime constraints the porcelain dishware did not go into production until 1949. Zeisel's dishes, known as "Museum" and "Castleton White," were manufactured and sold over the next several decades, initially in all-white as designed by Zeisel, and later with a wide variety of decorations. Zeisel credited this commission with establishing her reputation in the US, remarking that, "it made me an accepted first-rate designer rather than a run-of-the-mill designer."

"Museum's" success brought Zeisel to the attention of Red Wing Potteries, for whom she designed the perennially popular "Town and Country" in response to their request for dishes inspired by Greenwich Village.

Around 1949–1950, Zeisel was commissioned by the Hall China Company to create her most popular line, "Hallcraft, Tomorrow's Classic." Production began in 1952 and was a full line of dinnerware and tableware accessories, including plates, bowls, cups and saucers, serving platters and bowls, butter dishes, sugar bowls and creamers, candleholders, salt and pepper shakers, etc., initially intended to be offered in plain white. Some of her Pratt student-assistants were involved in designing the initial decal patterns that Hall requested. Other patterns were designed by the painter Charles Seliger.

In 1955, Zeisel created a second line for Hall called "Century" with production beginning in 1956. In the late 1950s she designed for several international companies including Rosenthal AG, and Mancioli Pottery.

=== Later career, 1980s–2011 ===
Zeisel stopped designing during the 1960s and 1970s, to work on American history writing projects. Her major research focused on the New York Conspiracy, an alleged slave rebellion in 1741 New York City which resulted in many innocent slaves being put to death or transported to plantations in the Caribbean. Zeisel found parallels between their trials and the Soviet show trials of which she had been a victim.

She returned to design work in the 1980s. Many of her later designs have found the same success as her earlier designs. These include glassware, ceramics, furniture and lamps for The Orange Chicken, porcelain, crystal and limited-edition prints for KleinReid, glasses and giftware for Nambé, a teakettle for Chantal, furniture and gift-ware for Eva Zeisel Originals, rugs for The Rug Company, "Classic-Century," one of Crate & Barrel's best selling dinner services, produced by Royal Stafford. This set combines pieces from the "Tomorrow's Classic" and "Century" lines. ("Classic-Century is now sold by EvaZeiselOriginals.com) Most of the pieces for this set were made from the original molds (dishwasher safe). She also created a line of flatware produced by Yamazaki for Crate & Barrel, and a coffee table and stoneware / dinnerware set (called Granit) for Design Within Reach.

A bone china tea set, designed in 2000, is manufactured by the Lomonosov Porcelain factory in St. Petersburg, Russia. Zeisel released two designs in 2010 through EvaZeiselOriginals.com: Eva Zeisel Lounge Chair and Eva Zeisel Salt & Pepper Shakers. The Lounge Chair was featured in the February 2010 issue of O Magazine and The S&P shakers were featured in the April 2010 issue of O Magazine. Her new designs for a line of glass lamps (pendant, wall and table lamps) was introduced in 2012 by Leucos USA.

In 2017 Spinneybeck/FilzFelt introduced a collection of felt, acoustic wall tiles based on Zeisel's tile and space divider designs. They come in 63 colors, and custom sizes.

Reproductions of earlier designs have been sold at MoMa, Brooklyn Museum and Neue Galerie, as well as other museum gift shops.

== Personal style ==
Eva Zeisel's designs are made for use. The inspiration for her sensuous forms often comes from the curves of the human body. Her sense of form and color, as well as her use of bird themes, show influence from the Hungarian folk arts she grew up with. Most of Zeisel's designs, whether in wood, metal, glass, plastic or ceramics, are designed in family groups. Many of her designs nest together creating modular designs that also function to save space.

Zeisel describes her designs in a New York Sun article: "I don't create angular things. I'm a more circular person—it's more my character....even the air between my hands is round."

Among her most collected shapes are the eccentric, biomorphic "Town and Country" dishes, produced by Red Wing Pottery, in 1947. This set includes the iconic "mother and child" salt and pepper shakers.

== Personal life and death ==
Zeisel raised two children with Hans: a daughter, Jean Richards, who was born in 1940 and a son, John Zeisel, who was born in 1944. In the documentary Throwing Curves: Eva Zeisel, John and Jean comment on their parents' tempestuous relationship in the 1940s and 1950s when the children were young. In the film, John claims that both Hans and Eva had dominant personalities, and that this often led to "a collision of forcefields".

Zeisel died in New City, New York on December 30, 2011, at the age of 105.

== Museums and exhibitions ==
Zeisel's works are in the permanent collections of the Metropolitan Museum; Brooklyn Museum; New-York Historical Society, Cooper-Hewitt Design Museum and The Museum of Modern Art, New York; the British Museum; The Victoria and Albert Museum, London; Bröhan Museum, Germany; as well as Dallas, Chicago, Atlanta and Milwaukee museums and others in the US and abroad.

In the 1980s, a 50-year retrospective exhibit of her work organized by the Musée des arts décoratifs de Montréal and the Smithsonian Institution traveled through the US, Europe and Russia. In 2004, a significant retrospective exhibition "Eva Zeisel: The Playful Search for Beauty" was organized by the Knoxville Museum of Art, which subsequently traveled to the Milwaukee Art Museum, the High Museum of Art, Atlanta, and the Hillwood Museum & Gardens, Washington, D.C.

From 2005 to 2007, the Erie Art Museum mounted the long-term exhibition "Eva Zeisel: The Shape of Life."

On December 10, 2006, The Mingei International Museum in Balboa Park, San Diego, opened a major centenary retrospective exhibit "Eva Zeisel: Extraordinary Designer at 100", showing her designs from Schramberg (1928) through more recent designs for Nambe, Chantal, Eva Zeisel Originals, The Orange Chicken, and others (2006). The show ran through August 12, 2007. In the same year, the Pratt Institute Gallery also organized an exhibition celebrating her centenary.

== Awards ==
In 2005, Zeisel won the Lifetime Achievement award from the Cooper-Hewett National Design Museum. She received the two highest civilian awards from the Hungarian government, as well as the Pratt Legends award and awards from the Industrial Designers Society of America and Alfred University. She was an honorary member of the Royal Society of Industrial Designers, and received honorary degrees from Parsons (New School), Rhode Island School of Design, the Royal College of Art, and the Hungarian University of the Arts.

== Publications ==
- Eva Zeisel: The Shape of Life Erie Art Museum, 2009, essay by Lance Esplund
- Eva Zeisel on Design by Eva Zeisel, Overlook Press 2004
- Eva Zeisel: The Playful Search for Beauty by Lucie Young, Chronicle Books 2003
- Eva Zeisel, Designer for Industry, 1984 (Out of print. Available through Eva Zeisel Forum).
- Eva Zeisel: Throwing Curves 2002 (documentary film), Canobie Films, Director: Jyll Johnstone.
- Regular Bulletins from Eva Zeisel Forum.
- Richards, Jean, ed. 2012, 2019. Eva Zeisel: A Soviet Prison Memoir. 2n edition. iBook version contains photos, original NKVD documents, audio and video clips; Kindle version and Kindle paperback, text only.
- Pat Kirkham, Pat Moore, and Pirco Wolfframm. 2013. Eva Zeisel: Life, Design, and Beauty. San Francisco: Chronicle Books. Complete works.
- Zelinsky, Volker. 2019. Eva Zeisel in Hamburg: Her Work For Hansa-Kunst-Keramik, 1927/28. Edition Kakenhan: Hamburg. 49pp, 40 illus.
