= Throwing Curves: Eva Zeisel =

Throwing Curves : Eva Zeisel
- Directed by: Jyll Johnstone
- Produced by: Canobie Films
- Starring: Eva Zeisel
- Release date: October 2002
- Running time: 60 minutes
- Country: United States
- Language: English

Throwing Curves : Eva Zeisel is a 2002 documentary film directed by Jyll Johnstone. The film follows and interviews then-97-year-old Hungarian industrial designer and ceramic artist Eva Zeisel. It examines how her upbringing, fame, and personality have influenced her work and reputation to the present day. Zeisel narrates her own history, including her escape from both the Soviet Union and Nazi-annexed Austria, as family members, friends, and relevant experts offer insights into her character. Alternating between archival footage and video interviews, the film explores how Zeisel's personal life has shaped the development of her work, which is on display in the Museum of Modern Art and other museums around the world. Zeisel's age is a key theme of the film, and several interviewees comment on her unusual industriousness and innovation for an elderly woman.

The film is the first in a series of three films by Directors Guild of America Award-nominated director Jyll Johnstone that "explores the lives of three 85-plus women still actively engaged in creative lives." Throwing Curves screened at the 2002 Mill Valley Film Festival and the Rocky Mountain Women's Festival.
