= Félix Somló =

Hungarian legal scholar

Felix Somló

Bódog (Felix) Somló (Hungarian: [ˈfeːliks ˈʃomloː]; 1873–1920) was a Hungarian legal scholar of Jewish heritage. Along with Hans Kelsen and Georg Jellinek, he belonged to the range of Austrian Legal Positivists.

He was a professor at the University of Kolozsvár. In 1920, he committed suicide out of disgust at the cession of his university to the Romanian state, an action that had taken place the previous year.

== Early life and career ==
Born in Pozsony (Bratislava) and growing up in Kolozsvár (Cluj), he was from an assimilated Hungarian Jewish familt. He was the child of engineer Lipót Fleischer and Jozefin Weinberger. He completed his studies in Kolozsvár, Leipzig, and Heidelberg. In 1899, he qualified as a private lecturer (magántanár) in legal philosophy, and in 1903 in political science, at the University of Kolozsvár. Concurrently, from 1899, he also taught at the Law Academy of Nagyvárad. He received his appointment as a full university professor at the University of Kolozsvár in 1905. From 1918, he served as a professor of political science and international law at the University of Budapest.

== Work ==
On March 29, 1903, the Hungarian Sociological Society (Társadalomtudományi Társaság) held a session at which Dr. Bódog Somló presented his study titled On the Theory of Social Evolution and Some of Its Practical Applications (A társadalmi fejlődés elméletéről és néhány gyakorlati alkalmazásáról). The March issue of Huszadik Század (Twentieth Century) published the text of the lecture and reported on the debate that followed. Endre Ady wrote an article about it. A distorted version of the text was forwarded to the relevant minister as alleged incitement against the monarchy. Ultimately, parliament cleared him — an outcome Ady hailed as a victory in the fight against clericalism. Throughout, Somló tried to remain in the background and avoid the limelight.

During the first phase of his career, until 1910, Bódog Somló was influenced by Herbert Spencer's evolutionary sociology. The works of his second period are refutations of the first: he moved away from naturalist sociology, placing legal and moral philosophy at the center of his attention.

His earliest surviving work is Parliamentarism in Hungarian Law (A parlamentarizmus a magyar jogban), a study in legal history. In his view, parliamentarism could only be a passing phenomenon in human history, a form of government suited strictly to a particular stage of development. His works Sociology (Szociológia, 1901), Ethics (Ethika, 1900), and Philosophy of Law (Jogbölcselet, 1901) clearly reflected the currents of thought that decisively influenced him: Spencerian evolutionary sociology, Gyula Pikler's theory of insight (belátásos elmélet), and Marxist sociology. Pikler’s theory of insight posits that people create law, the state, associations—and thus institutions of any kind—rationally; namely, when they realize and discover that they can satisfy their needs more expediently through a new institution than through the preceding one. Because insight is a mental process, Somló concluded that sociological regularities in the strict sense are impossible. Soon after, however, Somló rejected the assumption—taken as self-evident at that stage—that the factors contributing to the emergence of any social phenomenon exist exclusively within the human organism, i.e., that they are purely psychological.

He then marked out the domain of inquiry where he had previously denied it: in the reciprocal relationship between the human organism and its circumstances or environment. This shift materialized in State Intervention and Individualism (Állami beavatkozás és individualizmus) in 1903. In this work, Somló set out to establish the place and natural-scientific significance of state intervention within the natural course of social development. He opens with two key concepts: the human organism and the environment. Due to the fragmentary nature of human knowledge, state intervention can only ever be imperfect and may result in unintended consequences; however, this applies to all human action, and accepting Spencer's doctrines strictly would lead not to individualism, but to total passivity. State intervention does not contradict the natural law of adaptation; rather, in this case, adaptation takes place through the mediation of conscious mental life. Somló reaches a similar conclusion in his analysis examining the relationship between state intervention and natural selection. All that remained was to support inductively—through historical evidence—what he had demonstrated deductively, while simultaneously deflecting attacks from critics who feared that state intervention threatened human liberty. Examining the general evolution of the state, he arrives at the thesis that although the scope of state regulation expands, individuals submit to the rules increasingly spontaneously and voluntarily, thereby substantially weakening external coercion. This spontaneous compliance applies solely to existing legal norms, not to changes in the norms themselves. Anything that serves as a necessary condition for the development and modification of law must be declared natural law.

== Suicide ==
After the union of Transylvania with Romania, Somló received a teaching at the University of Bucharest, but he refused. After the signing of the Treaty of Trianon, he published his will in Budapest, leaving all of his wealth to the League for Hungary's Territorial Integrity. He then returned to Cluj, where he committed suicide.

== Books ==
- Félix Somló: Juristische Grundlehre. Felix Meiner, Leipzig 1917.
- Félix Somló: Gedanken zu einer ersten Philosophie. de Gruyter, Berlin 1926.
- Félix Somló: Juristische Grundlagen. 2., unveränd. Auflage. Felix Meiner, Leipzig 1927.
