= Double movement =

Dialectical economic process

The double movement is a concept originating with Karl Polanyi in his book The Great Transformation. The phrase refers to the dialectical process of marketization and push for social protection against that marketization. First, laissez-faire reformers seek to "disembed" the economy to establish what Polanyi calls a "market society" wherein all things are commodified, including what Polanyi terms "fictitious commodities": land, labor, and money. Second, a reactionary "countermovement" arises whereby society attempts to re-embed the economy through the creation of social protections such as labor laws and tariffs. In Polanyi's view, these liberal reformers seek to subordinate society to the market economy, which is taken by these reformers to be self-regulating. To Polanyi, this is a utopian project, as economies are always embedded in societies.

== Overview ==
According to The Great Transformation, the development of "market society" has been formed by the double movement. It has been found that this formulation is practical to analyze the last thirty years of global development. For example, laissez-faire has been the forerunner concept or movement of neoliberalism or market fundamentalism.

Although the concept of double movement has been criticized in that this formulation tended to be functionalism, it is still an efficient tool that works as a theoretical foundation.

First of all, Polanyi criticized the class analysis of Marxism. He brought up some problems with Marxist class analysis which only focus on the only narrow part of conflicts between employers and workers rather than deal with the overall political background where the conflicts occurred. Rather, Polanyi suggested that state power forms a different power between employers and workers. This also means the market system cannot be operated without government action. His saying "laissez-faire was planned" implies that laissez-faire is closely involved in managing the market economy. Since the market cannot produce invented fictitious commodities such as money, land, and labor at the right level of sustainable quantities, the government must involve in managing the supply and demand for the production process of these things. This fictitious concept of the market economy means that laissez-faire does not always operate in a perfect way. He argued the self-contradiction of market society is that itself cannot be a basis for social order, rather, government actions are needed for the production and maintenance of social order. Polanyi's analysis reforms the field where social struggles happen and provides a less class-deterministic explanation. These two innovations are intimately connected.

Polanyi also contributed to the global context field where social struggles take place. Before him, many other analysts were aware of globally expanding capitalism, but he provided further analysis of this global quality. He argued that the country's specific position within the global system of states constrains the social conflicts within a particular political state. It means that the two innovations, mentioned above, were global situations. The normal economic pattern showed that the global phenomena have been considerably determined the social struggles in countries. The reliance of the movement of laissez-faire on the global situation also generated unavoidable competition which is a cause of weakness of the international state system. Domestic counter-movement against nationalism showed a kind of loyalty to the adequate operation of the international economy in favor of chasing its own distinct way of development, which demands substantial management of markets from political power.

The dependence of laissez-faire on global hegemony is a complicated problem because this is the field where political leaders need negotiation to keep their political power for two main purposes. They need to maintain both the protection of the position of the nation within the international state system and the effective function of the domestic economy. Political leaders should pursue a balance between these two goals. If policies are weighted one-side for example, tilting to the laissez-faire, it undermines the domestic economy and the economy becomes to rely too much on the global stream. On the other hand, if policies are biased to the other goal, it disturbs the business environment and weakens the global status of the nation by diminishing sufficient foreign investment and resources. Therefore, all political leaders have to consider both risky situations and make a settlement at the proper balanced point. The relative powers between these two rival movements are determined by the political and economic status and how social participants think about and act against those particular situations.

On the one hand, there is a significant importance of a self-regulating mechanism of the market in Polanyi's study. Polanyi backed up Marx's assertion that it is more influential in pursuing interests when people have a common ideology rather than an individual goal. If it was not for the argument about commonly shared interests among social actors in a self-regulating market, the movement of laissez-faire would not have such a big impact on the global economy.

In the double movement, workers and capitalists are major actors who engage in these two movements and represent the key part of the two rival movements, respectively. Meanwhile, there are also different social groups that actively participate in these movements according to Polanyi's analysis. For instance, he argued that the bourgeoisie and proletariat had the most effect on society when they exerted their power from various influential social groups. In general, workers tended to stand by the counter-movement against laissez-faire and capitalists advocated the freedom and expansion of the market. Nevertheless, there were a few workers and capitalists who were supportive and vice versa at all times.

Polanyi also argued that the concept of a self-regulating market of laissez-faire is quite utopian thinking. The market system would break down if there isn't any management of government at all. In most cases, the supporters of the movement of laissez-faire claim that a self-regulating market works well by itself so that signals such as price from the market have the ability to allocate capital, labor, and land in a suitable way. However, a fairly large portion of these advocators would find that they are actually largely dependent on the government's regulation on the protection of their own property, control over low-class workers, and even the operation of the free market.

== Reception and influence ==
Mark Blyth's 2002 book Great Transformations is strongly influenced by Polanyi's work, in particular the notion of the double movement as the motor behind institutional change.

Torben Iversen and David Soskice have argued that social protection and markets go hand-in-hand, as the former resolves market failures.

Studies by David Cameron, Dani Rodrik and Peter Katzenstein have affirmed the insights of the double movement, as they show that greater trade openness has been associated with increases in government social spending. John Ruggie's concept of "embedded liberalism" is derived from the double movement.

== See also ==
- Substantivism
- Embedded liberalism
