= Ilona Duczyńska =

Polish-Hungarian-Canadian revolutionary

Ilona Duczynska
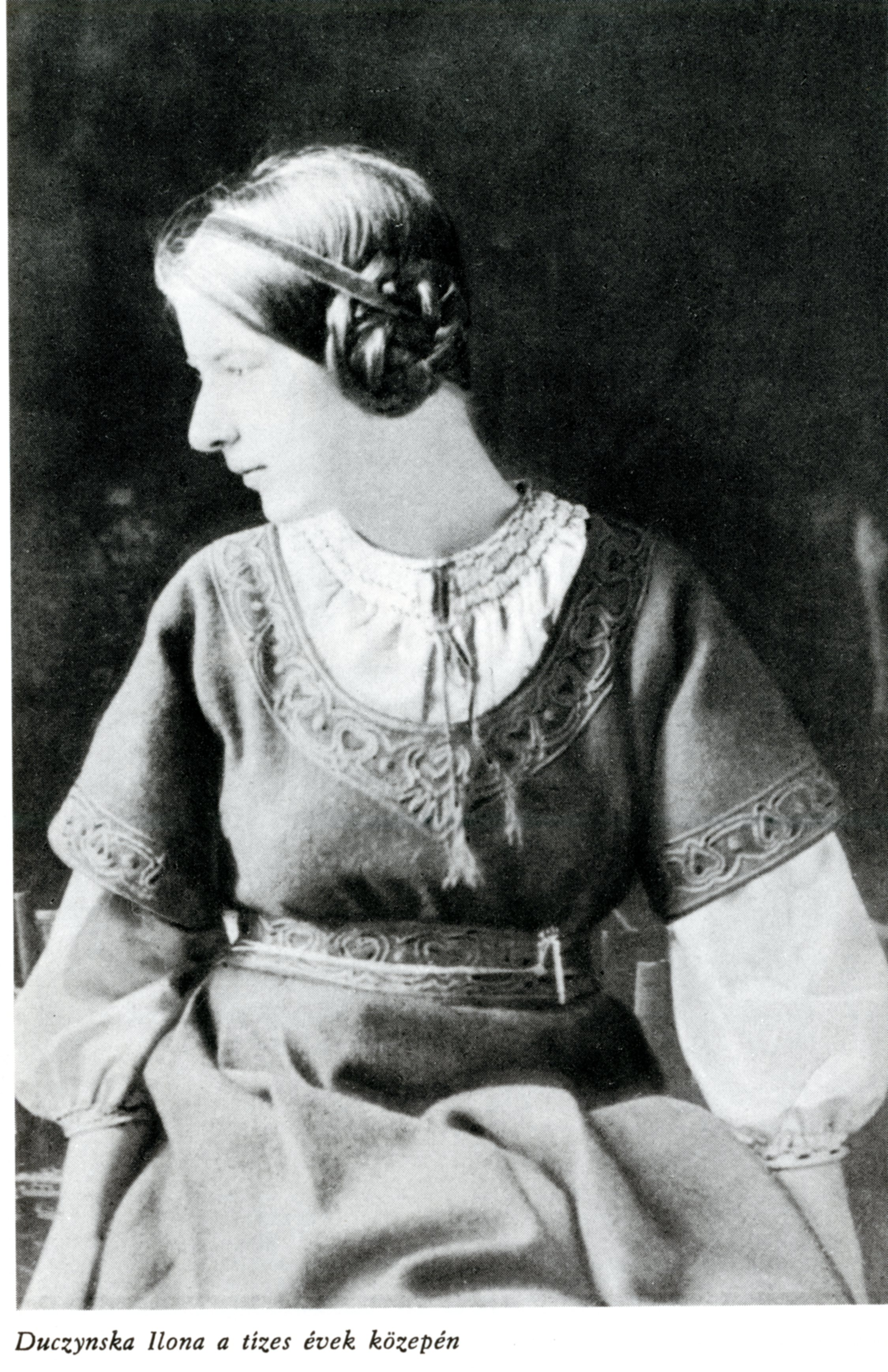
- Duczyńska, c. 1920
- Born: 11 March 1897; Maria Enzersdorf, Austria-Hungary
- Died: 24 April 1978 (aged 81); Pickering, Ontario, Canada
- Spouses: Tivadar Sugár (m. 1918; div. 1922); Karl Polanyi (m. 1923; died 1964)
- Children: Kari Polanyi Levitt
- Relatives: John Polanyi (nephew); Eva Zeisel (niece); Michael Polanyi (brother-in-law)

Ilona Duczynska (Polish: Ilona Duczyńska; Hungarian: Duczynska Ilona, Ducsinszka Ilona; 11 March 1897 – 24 April 1978) was a Polish-Hungarian-Canadian revolutionary, journalist, translator, engineer, and historian. Her husband was Karl Polanyi and her daughter is Kari Polanyi Levitt.

== Life ==
On 11 March 1897, Ilona Duczynska was born near Vienna to a Hungarian mother and a Polish-Austrian father. In 1915, during the First World War, she became acquainted with anarcho-syndicalist revolutionary Ervin Szabó, who connected her with the work of the Galileo Circle. She became a revolutionary socialist. For her anti-war activities, she was expelled from school in 1915. She studied engineering at the Technical University of Zurich. There she was befriended by a community of representatives of the Russian Social Democratic Party opposed to the war, including Lenin, his wife Krupskaya, and Angelica Balabanoff. Together with delegations from Germany, France, and Britain, as well as other European Labour and Socialist parties, they met to draft a program of action against the war, known as the Zimmerwald Declaration (see Zimmerwald Conference). The 18-year-old Duczynska was entrusted to smuggle this call to action into Hungary.

In Hungary, she took part in the early 1918 strikes that called successfully for workers' councils. During the Galilei trial, she was imprisoned. In the Aster Revolution, she and other revolutionaries were freed. On November 17, 1918, she married Sugár Tivadar and soon after joined the Hungarian Communist Party. During the Hungarian Soviet Republic, she worked in the propaganda department of the People's Commissariat for Foreign Affairs and she was a member of the Budapest Central Revolutionary Worker and Soldier Council.

She fled to Vienna to escape the counter-revolution in Hungary. With an excellent education and knowledge of several languages, she was called to Moscow to serve as translator to Karl Radek in the preparations for the historic Second International Congress of Communist Parties. Ilona returned to Vienna in 1920, and subsequently was expelled from the party for "Luxembourgist deviations" and a publication in a journal edited by Paul Levi, who also fell into disfavor with the party. In 1922, she divorced Sugár. The next year she married Karl Polanyi and their only child Kari was born. From 1927, she edited the Der linke Sozialdemokrat and organized the left opposition in the Vienna branch of the Austrian Socialist Party. Her underground name in Vienna was Anna Novotny. In 1929, she returned to university, the Technical University of Vienna, studying technology, mechanics, mechanical drawing, electronics, and electric number theory.

In 1933 Karl emigrated to England followed by Kari in 1934 and Ilona in 1936. Duczynska participated in the 1934 workers' uprising in Vienna. Following the destruction of the Austrian working class movement in February 1934, Duczynska rejoined the Communist Party in order to continue the struggle of the now-illegal Schutzbund, the military arm of the Austrian Social Democratic Party, until 1936 when she joined her family in London. Subsequently, she was expelled from the Austrian Communist Party in London on orders from Moscow.

When she returned to England from Bennington, Vermont in 1942/3, she worked in the Political Intelligence department of Foreign Affairs. During World War II she also worked for the Royal Aircraft Establishment testing model aircraft in wind tunnels for a year or perhaps two.

After World War II, the family moved to Canada. Due to her background as a former communist, Duczynska could not gain an entrance visa to the United States. Karl Polanyi began his teaching position at Columbia University. He commuted to New York City from Canada. In 1964, Karl Polanyi died. After Polanyi's death, she supervised the editing and publication of his posthumous works, and the translation of much of his oeuvre into Hungarian and several other languages.

In the 1970s, Duczynska joined the widowed Countess Katalin ("Katus") Károlyi and Júlia Rajk, the widow of László Rajk, in the front row of the trial of the dissident poet and philosopher Miklós Haraszti. Their presence was probably responsible for his receiving a suspended sentence. By this time Duczynska was associated with many leading Hungarian writers and poets. She translated most of the novels and short stories of József Lengyel whom English critics named "the Hungarian Solzhenitsyn."

Duczynska died on 24 April 1978 in Pickering.

== Bibliography ==
- "Zum Zerfall der K.P.U." (Notes on the Disintegration of the Communist Party of Hungary), Unser Weg [Our Way], edited by Paul Levi, 4, 1, Heft 5. March 1922. Berlin;
- "Duczynska Ilona feljegyzései az 1918-as januári sztrájk elözményeiröl," (with Márta Tömöry) Történelmi szemle, no. 1-2, 1958, pp. 154–173;
- The plough and the pen : writings from Hungary 1830-1956 (with Karl Polanyi, London: Owen, 1963);
- Mesterünk Szabó Ervin (Kortárs, 1968);
- Polányi Károly, 1886-1964 (Budapest: Akad. Ny., 1971);
- Polányi Károly és a Galilei Kör (Horváth Zoltánnal, Bp., 1971);
- Der demokratische Bolschewik: zur Theorie und Praxis der Gewalt (Munnich: List, 1975);
- Bécs, 1934, Schutzbund (Budapest: Magvető, 1976);
- Theodor Körner: auf Vorposten: ausgewählte Schriften 1928-1938 (Vienna: Europaverlag, 1977);
- Workers in arms: the Austrian Schutzbund and the Civil War of 1934 (New York; London: Monthly Review Press, 1978);
- A cselekvés boldogtalan szerelmese (Néhány adalékom Szabó Ervin emlékéhez);
- Széljegyzetek a K. M. P. bomlásához;
- "I first met Karl Polanyi in 1920...".

=== Translations ===
- Déry, Tibor: The giant. (Óriás, London, Calder, 1964.)
- Juhász, Ferenc: The boy changed into a stag: selected poems 1949-1967 (with Kenneth McRobbie, Toronto; New York; London, Oxford Univ. Press, 1970)
- Lengyel, József: Confrontation (London, Owen, 1973)
- Lengyel, József: Acta sanctorum and other tales (London, Owen, 1970.)
- Lengyel, József: The judge's chair (London, Owen, 1968.)
- Lengyel, József: Prenn drifting (London, Owen, 1966.)
- Lengyel, József: From beginning to end: the spell (London, Owen, 1966.)
