= Kari Polanyi Levitt =

Austrian-born Canadian economist

- Born: June 14, 1923 (age 103); Vienna, Austria
- Education: London School of Economics
- Alma mater: University of Toronto (MEc)
- Occupation: Economist
- Known for: Emerita Professor of Economics at McGill University, Montreal
- Spouse: Joseph Levitt
- Parents: Karl Polanyi (father); Ilona Duczynska (mother)
- Relatives: Michael Polanyi (uncle); John Polanyi (cousin); Eva Zeisel (cousin)
- Awards: Honorary Doctorate of the University of West Indies (2008)

Kari Polanyi Levitt (born June 14, 1923) is an Austrian-born Canadian economist, currently Emerita Professor of Economics at McGill University, Montreal.

She is known for her work on economic development and economic sovereignty, and in particular for her 1970 book Silent Surrender: The Multinational Corporation in Canada. She is also the literary executor of her deceased father, the economic historian Karl Polanyi.

== Biography ==
Polanyi Levitt was born in Vienna, Austria and relocated to England with her father in 1933 and attended Bedales School and the London School of Economics. After graduating in 1947 she moved to Canada, and in 1950 married the Canadian historian Joseph Levitt. She received a Master's degree in Economics from the University of Toronto in 1959, and joined the Department of Economics at McGill University in 1961. Over the next decade she undertook research projects for Statistics Canada and for the New Democratic Party of Canada in addition to her work at McGill. Her position paper for the NDP on foreign direct investment in Canada eventually became "Silent Surrender."

Polanyi Levitt has maintained contact with colleagues in the Caribbean throughout her career and has held several posts as a visiting professor at the University of the West Indies, as well as serving as an advisor on the creation of a system of national accounts for the Government of Trinidad and Tobago. She has written, edited and co-edited four volumes related to Caribbean economics. In 2008, she was awarded an honorary doctorate by the University of the West Indies.

Polanyi Levitt turned 100 on June 14, 2023.

== Works ==
- (Ed. with Radhika Desai) Karl Polanyi and Twenty-First Century Capitalism (2020)
- From the Great Transformation to the Great Financialization: On Karl Polanyi and Other Essays: Kari Polanyi Levitt (2013)
- (With Lloyd Best) Essays on the Theory of Plantation Economy: A Historical And Institutional Approach to Caribbean Economic Development (book)|(With Lloyd Best) (2009)
- Reclaiming Development: Independent Thought and Caribbean Community (2005)
- (Ed.) The George Beckford Papers (2000)
- (Ed. with 'Kenneth McRobbie) Karl Polanyi in Vienna (2000)
- The Life and Work of Karl Polanyi (1990)
- Silent Surrender: the Multinational Corporation in Canada (1970)
