= Embedded feminism =

Concept in feminism

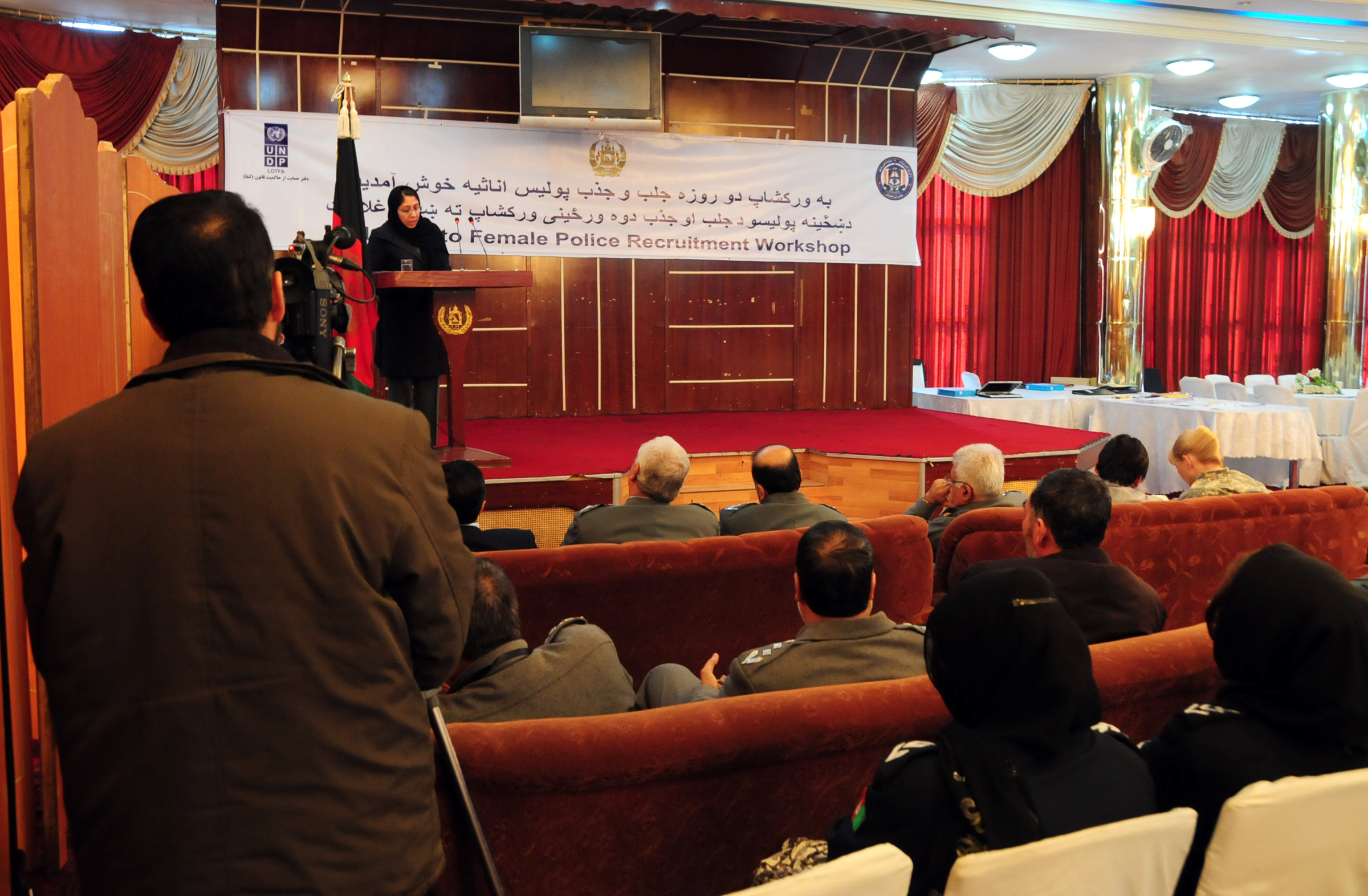
Col. Shafiqa Quraishi, Director of the Afghan National Police Gender Mainstreaming Unit, speaks at an ANP female recruiting conference

Embedded feminism is the attempt of state authorities to legitimize an intervention in a conflict by co-opting feminist discourses and instrumentalizing feminist activists and groups for their own agenda. This term was introduced in the analysis of the US-led invasion of Afghanistan, but can also be applied to several historical examples where women's rights were used as justification and legitimization of Western interventionism.

== Concept ==
Originally, Canadian gender researcher Krista Hunt developed the conceptual framework of embedded feminism to describe the gendered nature of the US-led invasion of Afghanistan in 2001 and the practice of the US government to justify the war on terror in the eyes of the public. Hunt defines the concept as the "incorporation of feminist discourse and feminist activists into political projects that claim to serve the interests of women, but ultimately subordinate and/or subvert that goal". Hunt coined the term embedded feminism referring to the "embedded journalism" or "embedded media" approach of the US Department of Defense which became prominent in the media coverage of the 2003 invasion of Iraq. The US government attached journalists, photographers, and camera people to military units and granted them unprecedented access to the battle frontline. Although embedded journalism provided the public with an exclusive view of the situation in Iraq, this practice was regarded as problematic, as it could undermine the independent reporting and promote the preferences of the government.

The "far-reaching process of appropriating and subverting feminism through appeals to women's rights" that is embedded feminism is different from simple co-optation practices by state authorities in so far as it goes beyond the absorption "of the meanings of the original concepts to fit into the prevailing political priorities".

== Historical implications in the women's rights fight ==
Krista Hunt argues that appeals to women's liberation have been embedded in political projects for centuries to mobilize feminists and their discourses. A large body of feminist literature has analyzed the gender-related dimensions of post-colonial projects where feminists from the Global North were convinced to get involved in order to "save" other oppressed women. Such "white savior" narratives generally presuppose a homogeneity of women as an oppressed group, as demonstrated in the work of Chandra Mohanty, and put into play the orientalized nature of the seemingly dangerous "brown man". Thus, feminism which was incorporated in the modernization and civilization projects of imperial countries is argued to have helped strengthening colonialism and patriarchy instead of promoting women's rights. Feminists also claim that feminist activists and their discourses have been instrumentalized for nationalist projects. During the Nasser era in Egypt for example, feminists are said to have played a major role in helping create a sense of cohesion and bonding and therefore directly contributed to the emergence of a national identity during and after the struggle for independence. Nevertheless, women remained mostly absent from the public sphere of politics once the project succeeded.

=== War on terror ===
The history of the war on terror throughout the sphere of international relations-embedded feminists argue- consistently showcases a male-stream discipline and a hyper-masculine war hero narrative. In other words, the story is narrated by these men, who hold high positions of power and are fixated to exemplify their heroic qualities to shield women from harm and collide with the world's difficulties. For example, according to the former US President, George W. Bush, the central goal of the terrorists is the brutal oppression of women...that is the reason this great nation, with our friends and allies, will not rest until we bring them all to justice. This rallying cry by the Bush administration is exactly the narrative that is at question. Statements such as these can suggest that Western (and more specifically American) men and women are obligated to free the oppressed Afghan woman, and therefore provide reasoning for interventionist international policy. It Furthermore, such statements often ignore the power dynamic between liberated white western women and the perceived oppressed Afghan women.

In 2001, the Bush administration began expressing their concerns for the situation of women under the Taliban regime. According to Hunt, it invoked the struggle for women's rights and women's liberation as a rationale to justify the invasion of Afghanistan. This increased gender awareness can be interpreted as part of a framing strategy which conflated the war on terror with the fight for women's rights as a proxy for universal human rights. In the eyes of many feminists, the rescue of oppressed women from the Taliban became the powerful normative legitimation of the invasion which obtained broad public approval. More importantly, this strategy could align itself with feminist groups that are traditionally pacifist, and could win their approval, thereby removing a critical opposition. The doubts in the government's commitment to further women's rights through war arose due to its lack of interest before the September 11 attacks. It was only after the terror attacks, that politicians in the US and in Europe began broadly supporting women's liberation from the Taliban. Despite its usual non-violent stance, the Feminist Majority Foundation (FMF) supported the policies of the Bush administration and is therefore regarded as one of the most vocal feminist supporters embedded in the war on terror. Although the FMF saw the government's increased gender awareness as a success of their ‘Stop Gender Apartheid’ campaign, their involvement in Bush's political project was strongly criticized by other NGOs and the critical public because their role was considered to be legitimizing. Hunt sees embedded feminism as a concept that was used to advance the engendered war story of the Bush administration that the invasion of Afghanistan could liberate Afghan women. It has further created a division between feminist groups that supported the war and those groups that refused to get involved in the usurpation of feminism for war. A division also emerged between "Western" feminists who strived to save the "other" women from an orientalised enemy and Afghan feminists who criticized the notion that war could liberate them.

== Hegemonic Western feminism and post-colonial critique ==
Hunt notes that there is a striking similarity between the logic of embedded feminism in colonialist projects and the war on terror. Both are inherently Eurocentric and present the West as culturally and normatively superior to the "unmodern" Eastern societies. This rationale would give the West a prerogative to intervene and rescue the "monolithic group" of other women who have no agency on their own. Gayatri Spivak's post-colonial critique of the relationship between the colonizers and the colonized subjects in "Can the Subaltern speak?" condenses this relationship to the strategy of "white men saving brown women from brown men". This analysis can also be applied to the seemingly neo-imperialist strategy that the US government pursued by framing Taliban men in Afghanistan as a danger to women of which were presented as victims in need of help from the West. Characteristic of Western hegemonic feminism was the disregard of Western actors for the opinions of Afghan women's groups who argued that a war would certainly have a negative impact on women and fuel fundamentalist sentiments. In the aftermath, Bush's agenda was in fact interpreted as an attack on Islamic values and resulted in a backlash from the conservative forces. Hegemonic feminism also tends to reproduce binary gender roles, especially in the visual representation of women and children as victims of war or oppression in the media. Cynthia Enloe has called this conflation of women and children as victimized subjects "women and children", a single trope that is being invoked in patriarchical narratives to support state security interests.

== Contextualisation ==
The unique nature of embedded feminism as a state strategy is not just the argumentation based on the representation of women and children as victims, but the conjunction of this discourse with the struggle for women's rights. Hunt's concept has made an impact on gender-related conflict research and has been applied to the wars in Iraq, Kosovo and Afghanistan. Embedded feminism can also be used in other contexts such as neo-liberal globalization and can be applied to several other policy fields where pseudo-feminist arguments and feminist groups are misused to legitimize a state-led action or to construct an alternative story.

== See also ==
- Feminism (international relations)
- Femonationalism
