= Embedded liberalism =

Global economic system, 1945 to 1970s

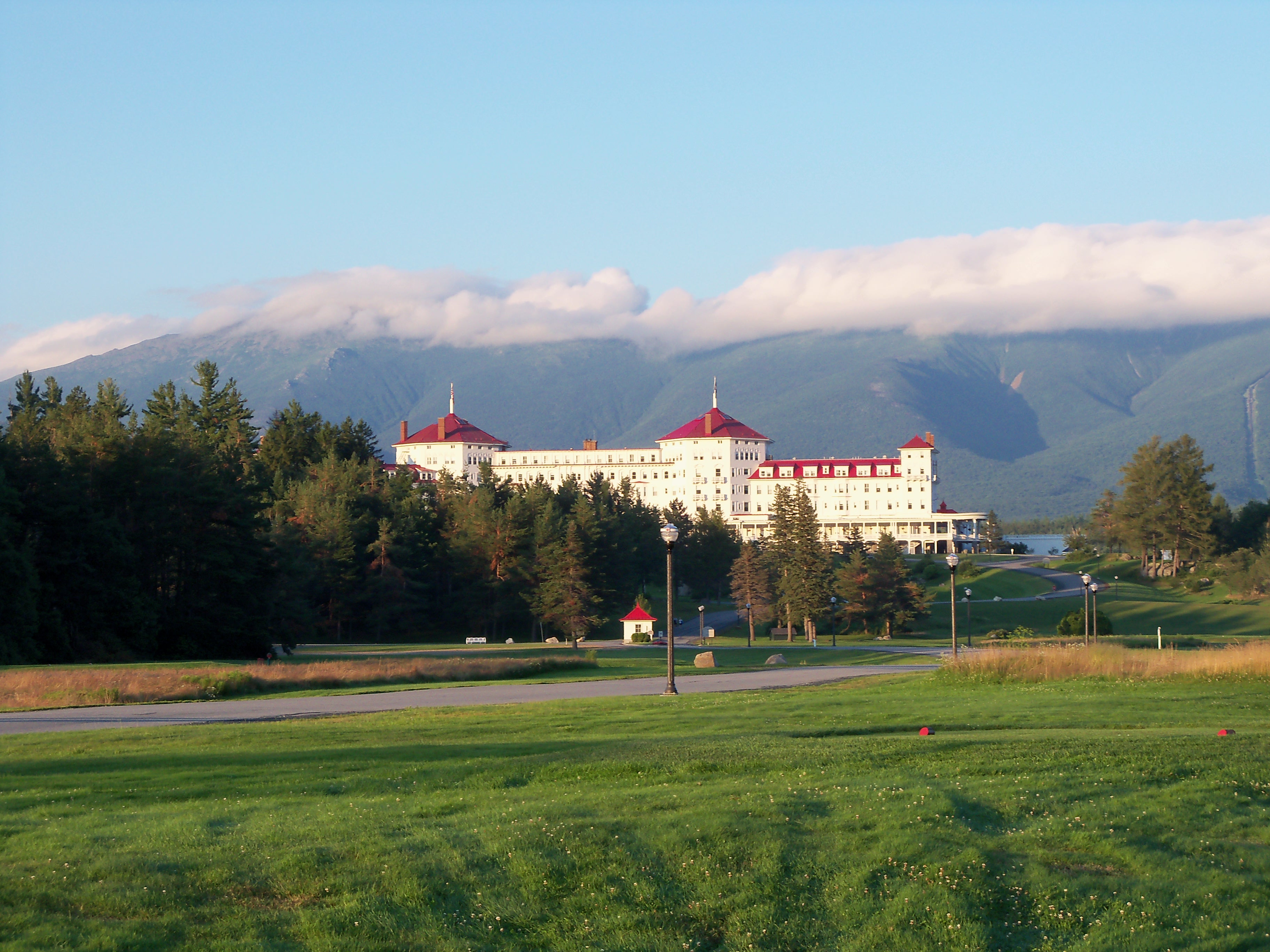
The new International Monetary System which would embody the values of embedded liberalism was largely designed at the Bretton Woods Conference, hosted at the Mount Washington Hotel in 1944

Embedded liberalism is a term in international political economy for the global economic system and the associated international political orientation as they existed from the end of World War II to the 1970s. The system was set up to support a combination of free trade with the freedom for states to enhance their provision of welfare and to regulate their economies to reduce unemployment. The term was first used by the American political scientist John Ruggie in 1982.

Mainstream scholars generally describe embedded liberalism as involving a compromise between two desirable but partially conflicting objectives. The first objective was to revive free trade. Before World War I, international trade formed a large portion of global GDP, but the classical liberal order which supported it had been damaged by war and by the Great Depression of the 1930s. The second objective was to allow national governments the freedom to provide generous welfare programmes and to intervene in their economies to maintain full employment. This second objective was considered to be incompatible with a full return to the free market system as it had existed in the late 19th century—mainly because with a free market in international capital, investors could easily withdraw money from nations that tried to implement interventionist and redistributive policies.

The resulting compromise was embodied in the Bretton Woods system, which was launched at the end of World War II. The system was liberal in that it aimed to set up an open system of international trade in goods and services, facilitated by semi-fixed exchange rates. Yet it also aimed to embed market forces into a framework where they could be regulated by national governments, with states able to control international capital flows by means of capital controls, as well as engage in state-led development strategies, short-term IMF borrowing, and exchange rate adjustments. New global multilateral institutions were created to support the new framework, such as the World Bank and the International Monetary Fund.

When Ruggie coined the phrase embedded liberalism, he was building on earlier work by Karl Polanyi, who had introduced the concept of markets becoming disembedded from society during the 19th century. Polanyi went on to propose that the reembedding of markets would be a central task for the architects of the post war world order and this was largely enacted as a result of the Bretton Woods Conference. In the 1950s and 1960s, the global economy prospered under embedded liberalism, with growth more rapid than before or since, yet the system was to break down in the 1970s. Ruggie's work on embedded liberalism rebutted hegemonic stability theory (the notion that a hegemon is necessary to sustain multilateral cooperation) by arguing that the international order was not just maintained through material power but "with legitimate social purpose".

== Previous systems ==
=== Embedded markets: all periods up to 1834 ===
Karl Polanyi argues that until the rise of 19th-century liberalism markets, where they had existed at all, were always and everywhere embedded in society, subject to various social, religious and political controls. The forms of these controls varied widely, for example in India occupations were for centuries determined by caste, rather than market forces. During the Middle Ages, physical markets in Europe were generally heavily regulated, with many towns only permitting larger markets (then known as fayres) to open once or twice a year.

Polanyi explicitly refutes Adam Smith's statement that natural man has a "propensity to barter, truck and exchange", arguing that anthropology and economic history shows that until the 19th century markets had only a marginal role in the economy, with by far the most important methods governing the distribution of resources being reciprocal gift giving, centralised redistribution and autarky (self-sufficient households). While Polanyi concedes that European society was beginning to develop towards modern capitalism from as early as the 14th century, especially after the Glorious Revolution and the commencement of the Industrial Revolution, he contends that it was not until 1834 that the establishment of truly free markets became possible. Polanyi calls this disembedding of markets from society a "singular departure" from anything that had happened before in human history. Prior to the 19th century, international trade was very low in proportion to global GDP.

=== Classical liberalism: disembedded markets, 1834–1930s ===
According to Polanyi, a key event of 1834 which allowed the formation of free markets to take place in Great Britain (the worlds foremost economy at the time) was the abolition of outdoor relief which followed the seizure of political power by the middle classes in 1832. With the unemployed poor unable to get any form of financial help except by entering workhouses and with workhouses made much more oppressive than they had been before, the unemployed would tend to go to any lengths to obtain work, which established a free market in labour. Polanyi concedes that during the 19th century the free market helped deliver unprecedented material progress. He also contends it caused enormous hardship to wide sections of the population as seemingly paradoxically a rapid general increase in prosperity was accompanied by a rapid increase in the number of paupers. To some extent, this phenomenon had been under way in both Europe and Great Britain from the dawn of the Agricultural Revolution, accelerating with the Industrial Revolution in mid-18th century, but it became more acute after 1834.

In both Britain and Europe, labour movements and other forms of resistance arose almost immediately, though they had little sustained effect on mainstream politics until the 1880s. In Britain, although tens of thousands starved to death or were forced into workhouses and prostitution, social unrest was relatively low as on the whole even the working class were quick to benefit from the increasing prosperity. In part, this was due to Britain's early adoption of the free market and her lead in the Industrial Revolution. On continental Europe, unrest erupted in the Protests of 1848, after which Karl Marx and Friedrich Engels launched their Communist Manifesto, although this did not have any great immediate effect. For the most part, from 1834 until the 1870s free market ideology enjoyed almost unchallenged ascendancy in Great Britain and was expanding its influence abroad. In 1848, Lord Macaulay published his The History of England. Though Macaulay was mainly looking back at the 17th century, he also anticipated the enduring triumph of free market liberalism.

By the 1880s, various labour market protections had been enacted, causing Herbert Spencer, at the time perhaps the world's most prominent advocate of economic liberalism, to raise the alarm at the rising power of socialism. Polanyi explained this in terms of a double movement for the dialectical process of marketization along with an opposing push for social protection against that marketization. During the late 19th and early 20th century, in the field of politics, labour relations and trade free market supporters suffered further set backs with intellectual and the moral attacks from an informal networks of progressive reformers. This included groups like the Fabians; individuals such as Keir Hardie and Pope Leo XIII with his social encyclical Rerum novarum; and national leaders like Otto von Bismarck and David Lloyd George, who both introduced early precursors of the welfare state. In the United States, this period has been labelled the Progressive Era. Other developments not necessarily associated with the progressive movement yet still opposed to the free market, included various countries such as the United States significantly increasing their trade tariffs. In contrast, within mainstream academia and the practice of international finance free market thinking remained largely ascendant until the 1930s. Although the gold standard had been suspended by World War I, international financiers were largely successful in re-establishing it in the 1920s. It was not until the crisis of 1931 that Britain decided to leave the gold standard, with the United States following in 1933. By the mid-1930s, the global liberal economic order had collapsed, with the old, highly integrated trading system replaced by a number of closed economic blocks. Similarly, in mainstream economics free market thinking was undermined in the 1930s by the success of the New Deal and by the Keynesian Revolution. After a transition period and World War II, embedded liberalism emerged as the dominant economic system.

== Embedded liberalism: 1945–1970s ==
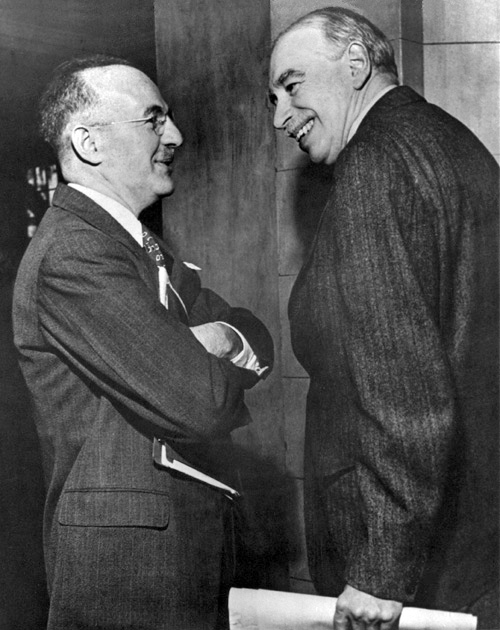
John Maynard Keynes (right) and Harry Dexter White at the Bretton Woods conference, where the key institutions that would support embedded liberalism were created

Mainstream scholars such as John Ruggie tend to see embedded liberalism as a compromise between the desire to retain as many as possible of the advantages from the previous era's free market system while also allowing states to have the autonomy to pursue interventionist and welfare based domestic policies. Anticipating the trilemma that would later be formulated as the impossible trinity, John Maynard Keynes and Harry Dexter White argued that freedom of movement for capital conflicted both with nation state's freedom to pursue economic policies based on their domestic circumstances and also with the semi-fixed exchange rate system that was widely agreed to be important to maximise international trade in goods and services. As such, it was widely agreed that states would be free to enact capital controls, which would help them simultaneously maintain both fixed exchange rates and, if desired, expansionary domestic policies. During the 1950s and 1960s, embedded liberalism and Keynesian economics were so popular the conservative politicians found they had to largely adopt them if they were to have a chance of getting elected. This was especially the case in Britain and was called the post-war consensus, with a similar though somewhat less Keynesian consensus existing elsewhere, including in the United States.

Marxist scholars tend to broadly agree with the mainstream view, though they emphasise embedded liberalism as a compromise between class interests, rather than between different desirable yet partially incompatible objectives. David Harvey argues that at the end of World War II the primary objective was to develop an economic plan that would not lead to a repeat of the Great Depression during the 1930s. Harvey states:

To ensure domestic peace and tranquility, some sort of class compromise between capital and labor had to be constructed. The thinking at the time is perhaps best represented by an influential text by two eminent social scientists, Robert Dahl and Charles Lindblom, published in 1953. Both capitalism and communism in their raw forms had failed, they argued. The only way ahead was to construct the right blend of state, market, and democratic institutions to guarantee peace, inclusion, well-being, and stability.

Harvey notes that under this new system free trade was regulated "under a system of fixed exchange rates anchored by the US dollar's convertibility into gold at a fixed price. Fixed exchange rates were incompatible with free flows of capital". In addition, there was a worldwide acceptance that "the state should focus on full employment, economic growth, and the welfare of its citizens and that state power should be freely deployed, alongside of or, if necessary, intervening in or even substituting for market processes to achieve these ends". He also states that this new system came to be referred to as embedded liberalism in order to "signal how market processes and entrepreneurial and corporate activities were surrounded by a web of social and political constraints and a regulatory environment that sometimes restrained but in other instances led the way in economic and industrial strategy".

In 1960, Daniel Bell published The End of Ideology, where he celebrated what he anticipated to be an enduring change, with extreme free market thinking permanently relegated to the fringe. However, Harvey argues that while embedded liberalism led to the surge of economic prosperity which came to define the 1950s and 1960s, the system began to crack beginning in the late 1960s. The 1970s were defined by an increased accumulation of capital, unemployment, inflation (or stagflation as it was dubbed) and a variety of fiscal crises. He notes that "the embedded liberalism that had delivered high rates of growth to at least the advanced capitalist countries after 1945 was clearly exhausted and no longer working". A number of theories concerning new systems began to develop, which led to extensive debate between those who advocated "social democracy and central planning on the one hand" and those "concerned with liberating corporate and business power and re-establishing market freedoms on the other". Harvey notes that by 1980 the latter group had emerged as the leader, advocating and creating a global economic system that would become known as neoliberalism.

== Subsequent systems ==
=== Neoliberalism: redisembedded markets, 1981–2009 ===
After the transition period of the 1970s, the neoliberal era is commonly said to have begun at about 1980. Also referred to by economic historians as the Washington Consensus era, its emergence was marked by the rise to power of Margaret Thatcher in Great Britain and Ronald Reagan in the United States. While there was no attempt to revive the previous system of fixed exchange rates on a global scale, neoliberalism upheld a similar commitment to free trade as had the previous era. Similar to the era of classical economic liberalism, neoliberalism involved the disembedding of markets. At a policy level, some of the main changes involved pressure for governments to abolish their capital controls and to refrain from economic interventions. However, many of the institutions established in the previous era remained in place and free market ideology never became as influential as it had been during the peak years of classical liberalism. In a 1997 paper, Ruggie himself discussed how some of the protection gained for workers with the embedded liberal compromise still lived on, though he warned it was being eroded by the advance of market forces.

In Britain and the United States, domestic free market reforms were pursued most aggressively from about 1980–1985. Yet from a global perspective, the peak years of neoliberal influence were the 1990s. After the 1991 dissolution of the Soviet Union, there was an acceleration of the pace at which countries throughout the world chose or were coerced into implementing free market reforms. In 1992, political scientist Francis Fukuyama suggested that free-market capitalism coupled with liberal democracy may be a stable end point in human social evolution in the End of History and the Last Man. Yet by 1999, various adverse economic events, most especially the 1997 Asian financial crisis and the harsh response by the International Monetary Fund had already caused free-market policies to be at least partially discredited in the eyes of developing world policy makers, especially in Asia and South America.

=== Post-Washington Consensus: mixed liberalisms, 2009–present ===
After the 2008 financial crisis, several journalists, politicians and senior officials from global institutions such as the World Bank began saying that the Washington Consensus was over. As part of the 2008–2009 Keynesian resurgence, it briefly appeared that there might be a prospect of a return to embedded liberalism—there had been an upsurge in global collaboration by the world's policy makers, with several heads of state calling for a "New Bretton Woods". Yet by 2010, the short lived consensus for a return to Keynesian policy had fractured. Economic historian Robert Skidelsky suggested it was too soon to identify the characteristics of the new global economic order and it may be that no single order will emerge. For instance, with the rise of the BRICS and other emerging economies, there is less scope for a single power to effectively set the rules for the rest of the world.

As of late 2011, there had been some trends consistent with a move away from economic liberalism, including a growing acceptance for a return to the use of capital controls, macroprudential regulation and state capitalism. On the other hand, China has been progressively liberating its capital account well into 2012 while in the United States the Tea Party movement emerged as a powerful political force, with members who appear to be committed to a purer vision of the free market than has existed since the peak of classical liberalism in the 1840s. In 2011, professor Kevin Gallagher suggested that rather than being largely governed by a single ideology as had been the case for the previous eras, the newly emerging global order is influenced by "varieties of liberalism". However, George Monbiot said in 2013 that neoliberalism remained an influential ideology.

According to Edward Mansfield and Nita Rudra, the digital revolution has undermined embedded liberalism by facilitating a spread in global supply chains, facilitating automation, connecting capital in the developed world with labor in the developing world, and strengthening multinational corporations.

== See also ==
- Double movement
- International political economy
- Social liberalism
- Embedded feminism
