= Economistic fallacy =

The economistic fallacy is a concept originated by Karl Polanyi in the 1950s, that refers to fallacious conflation of human economy in general, with its market form. Whereas the former is a necessary component of any society, being the organization through which that society meets its physical wants, i.e. reproduces itself, the latter is a modern institution that is neither autonomous nor stable. The fallacy can occur either by narrowing the genus "economic" to merely market phenomena, or overextending "the market" to encompass all aspects of human economic activity. These moves can be seen as equating the conceptual content of "economics" with what is in fact mere form or ideology, instead of with the substance embodied by the specific decisive relations in which humans are engaged in any given period and locale.

Polanyi considered the roots of this fallacy to lie in a particularly pervasive form of subjectivity specific to the conditions of life in nineteenth century industrial economies, describing it as the "central illusion of an age". Contemporary scholars support the enduring prevalence of the fallacy, which is further explained by Polanyi's analysis of its entrenchment in various institutions.

Polanyi developed the concept over time, devoting the first chapter of his posthumously-published book The Livelihood of Man to the subject. It elaborates on his concept of embeddedness, that humans are social creatures and that economic activity takes place in, and because of, social contexts. The economistic fallacy is used to criticize both Marxist economics and classical liberalism, focusing on their assumptions built on materialism and rationality. The economistic fallacy is also used to reject the tendency of Marxists and classical liberals alike to separate economics from other fields of human life and study and to reduce those aspects and fields to mere aspects of economics.

== See also ==
- Embeddedness
- Economism
- Economics empiricism
- Economic determinism
- Critique of political economy
