= International legal system =

The international legal system is the body of rules, principles, institutions, law, and norms that govern relations between actors on the international level.

According to realist theory, the international legal system is the foundation for the conduct of international relations. It is this system that regulates state actions under international law. The principal subjects of international law are states, rather than individuals as they are under municipal law. The International Court of Justice acknowledged in the Reparation for Injuries case that types of international legal personality other than statehood could exist and that the past half century has seen a significant expansion of the subjects of international law. Apart from states, international legal personality is also possessed by international organizations and, in some circumstance, human beings. In addition, non-governmental organizations and national liberation movements have also been said to possess international legal personality.

Since 1945 the international legal system has been dominated by the United Nations and the structures that were established as part of that organization. While the UN has been the object of significant criticism, it has nevertheless played a pivotal role both in the progressive development and codification of international law.

The General Assembly of the UN has sponsored and promoted some of the most important developments of the last fifty years through the adoption of multilateral treaties and instruments. The Convention on the Law of the Sea 1982 and the Vienna Convention on the Law of Treaties 1969 are two of the most prominent examples. A significant role in the legal work of the UN is played by the Sixth Committee (Legal), one of the six committees of the General Assembly. The Committee deals with international law under Article 13(1)(a) of the United Nations Charter, which authorizes the General Assembly to initiate studies and make recommendations to encourage the progressive development and codification of international law.

== See also ==
- International arbitration
- International law
- International litigation
- International order
- Charter of the United Nations
- Geneva Conventions of 1949

== Bibliography ==
- Reparation for Injuries Suffered in the Service of the United Nations (Advisory Opinion) [1949] ICJ Reports 174 at 178.
