= Fred L. Block =

American sociologist

Fred L. Block (born June 28, 1947) is an American sociologist, and research professor of sociology at UC Davis. Block is widely regarded as one of the world's leading economic and political sociologists. His interests are wide-ranging. He has been noted as an influential follower of Karl Polanyi.

Block has served on the Board of the Karl Polanyi Institute of Political Economy since 1989 and was a Distinguished Scientific Visitor to the Republic of China in 1995. He has also written for The Nation, The American Prospect, In These Times, Commonweal, Boston Review, and Tikkun.

== Biography ==
Block is the son of attorney Frederick H. Block. He formerly taught at the University of Pennsylvania. He is married to Carole Joffe, a sociologist, author and activist for women's reproductive rights. They have two children.

== Works ==
Block first came to prominence for his dissertation which was later published as the Origins of International Economic Disorder: Study of United States International Monetary Policy from World War II to the Present. In this study he asserted what would become a career long interest in the destabilizing influence of unregulated capital flows across national borders. He would also publish an influential argument on the nature of the elite called The Ruling Class Does Not Rule, which began a decade long debate with social psychologist G. William Domhoff.

Block is the author of five major books: The Vampire State and Other Myths and Fallacies About The U.S. Economy (1996), Postindustrial Possibilities: A Critique of Economic Discourse (1990), The Mean Season: The Attack On the Welfare State (co-authored with Richard A. Cloward, Barbara Ehrenreich, and Frances Fox Piven) (1987), Revising State Theory: Essays In Politics and Postindustrialism (1987), and The Origins of International Economic Disorder: A Study of United States International Monetary Policy From World War II to the Present (1977).

In 2000, he edited the many editions of Karl Polanyi's classic work The Great Transformation into a single edition. He has also published many journal articles on economic sociology, political sociology, sociology of work, and sociological theory in Politics & Society, World Policy Journal, Socialist Review, Theory and Society, Annual Review of Sociology, and Social Problems.

In later years, Block gained a more exclusively economic focus publishing three extremely influential works that included two books, Postindustrial Possibilities and The Vampire State; as well as a more prescriptive article on ways capitalist economies could be reformed for more just and efficient results in Capitalism without Class Power. Of these, Postindustrial Possibilities is the most widely regarded as a sweeping statement on the findings of economic sociology as a field of study combined with Block's own original contribution woven into the narrative. The Vampire State marks a bit of a return to explicitly political content although it is embedded into a discussion of United States economic policy.

Block's 2014 book, The Power of Market Fundamentalism: Karl Polyani's Critique (HUP, 2014), which he co-authored with Margaret Somers, examines the rise of free-market ideology from the ashes of the Great Depression, and looks more generally at its continued survival in the face of laissez-faire's repeated failures.

His most recent book, Capitalism: the Future of an Illusion (University of California Press, 2018), explores the illusory view that capitalist economies are autonomous, coherent, and regulated by their own internal laws. Block's argument is that the capitalist illusion is an entire economistic social theory that has become part of society's common sense. The work contends that restoring the vitality of the United States and the world economy can be accomplished only with major reforms on the scale of the New Deal and the post–World War II building of new global institutions.
