= Open market =

Economic and financial term

The term open market is used generally to refer to an economic situation close to free trade. In a more specific, technical sense, the term refers to interbank trade in securities.

== In economic theory ==
Economists judge the "openness" of markets according to the amount of government regulation of those markets, the scope for competition, and the absence or presence of local cultural customs which get in the way of trade. In principle, a fully open market is a completely free market in which all economic actors can trade without any external constraint. In reality, few markets exist which are open to that extent, since they usually cannot operate without an enforceable legal framework for trade which guarantees security of property, the fulfillment of contractual obligations associated with transactions, and the prevention of cheating.

A physical open market is a space where anyone wishing to trade physical goods may do so free of selling charges and taxes, and has come to be regarded by many activists as the ultimate social enterprise and a major tool for tackling unemployment.

In a more general sense the term has started to be used in economics and political economy, in which an open market refers to a market which is accessible to all economic actors. In an open market so defined, all economic actors have an equal opportunity of entry in that market. This contrasts with a market closed by a monopoly which dominate an industry, and with a protected market in which entry is conditional on certain financial and legal requirements or which is subject to tariff barriers, taxes, levies or state subsidies which effectively prevent some economic actors from participating in them (see protectionism).

The concept of an open market in this general sense is sometimes criticized on the ground that participation in it is conditional on having sufficient money, income or assets. Lacking sufficient money, income or assets, people may be effectively excluded from participation. Thus, whereas people may have sufficient funds to participate in some markets, their funds are inadequate to participate in other markets. This raises the question of whether markets are ever truly "open", and suggests that the "openness" of markets is more a relative concept. In response to this type of criticism, the concept of open market is often redefined to mean a situation of free competition, and the inability to participate is explained as a lack of competitiveness. On this view, if people were more competitive they would be able to participate, and thus their lack of funds is due to their unwillingness to compete for resources. On this view, lack of participation in an open market is either a subjective preference or a personal defect.

== In banking ==
In banking and financial economics, the open market is the term used to refer to the environment in which bonds are bought and sold between a central bank and its regulated banks. It is not a free market process.

- To intervene in the "business cycle", a central bank may choose to go into the open market and buy or sell government bonds, which is known as open market operations to increase reserves. Open Market Operations are when the central bank buys bonds from other banks in exchange for cheques. These local banks then cash the cheques, which allow them to take money from the central bank. This action thus decreases any credit the local banks may owe to the central bank, and also increases their money supply. This thus increases reserves.
- Stated otherwise: To intervene in the "business cycle", a central bank may choose to buy (or sell) government securities from (or to) the banks which it regulates, thereby increasing (or decreasing) the reserves (not deposits) of those banks; the regulated banks must comply with the buy & sell orders of the central bank. This process is known as open market operations. For example, a central bank may command its regulated banks to sell government bonds or bills to the central bank, which pays with cheques or electronic transactions which are cashed by these banks, moving money from the central bank to the bank reserves (not deposits) of the regulated banks.

== See also ==
- Free market
- Money market
