= Gyula Pikler =

Hungarian legal scholar

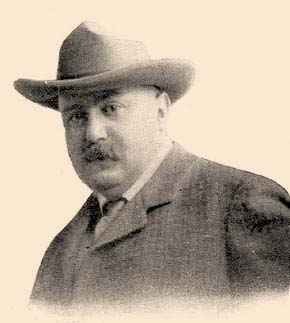
- Born: 21 May 1864; Temesvár, Kingdom of Hungary (now Timișoara, Romania)
- Died: 28 November 1938 (aged 74); Ecséd, Kingdom of Hungary
- Resting place: Ecséd
- Occupations: Lawyer, Legal Scholar

Gyula Pikler (21 May 1864 – 28 November 1937) Hungarian philosopher of law, university professor, member of the Society for Social Sciences. He was one of the most prominent and influential representatives of positivist philosophy of law and state, and was also known abroad. It was under his influence and around his person that the Galileo Circle was founded in Budapest in 1908, which was joined primarily by progressive young intellectual people.

== Career ==
He was born into a Banatian Jewish family. He was the oldest child of Lipót Pikler and Jozefin Singer. Pikler completed his secondary school education in Uzhhorod and his university studies at the Faculty of Law of the University of Pest. Between 1884 and 1891 he was assistant librarian of the House of Representatives. In 1886 he obtained a private teaching qualification at the University of Budapest. From 1891 he was an honorary professor at the University of Budapest, from 1896 he was an extraordinary professor, from 1903 to 1920 he was a full professor in the Department of Law and Political Science.

His major work was "On the Origin and Development of Law", in which he developed his own theory of the state and law, which was the basis of his own views.

Because of his positivist worldview, he fought with the supporters of conservative and clerical trends in his press debates for years, thus he was often attacked by right-wing conservative journalists for his views. Even in parliamentary speeches, he was often criticized by the radical right, despite the fact that Pikler never having been an active politician or a member of parliament.

In the early years of the century, he worked together with colleagues, Oszkár Jászi, Ágost Pulszky, Rusztem Vámbéry in 1900, Somló Bódog, he launched the Huszadik Század',(Twentieth Century) a bourgeois radical social science journal, and a year later the Társadalomtudományi Társaság (Society of Social Sciences) was founded. He was vice-president of the society from 1901 and president from 1906 to 1920. After 1910 he quietly retired from public life and devoted most of his academic work to psychology and psychophysiology. During his lifetime he published on legal philosophy and sociology in a number of journals, including the "Huzadik Század" (Twentieth Century), Our Century and the Journal of Legal Studies.

In the spring of 1919, he applied for leave due to ill health and left for Vienna. After the fall of Hungarian Soviet Republic, he retired in 1925.

His wife was Anna Spitzer. For the rest of his life, he lived on his family's estate in Ecséd, where he studied visual physiological observations and experiments, which he also published in German. He died in Budapest on 28 November 1937, at 9 am, due to coronary calcification. His home today houses the kindergarten in Ecsed.
