= Margaret Somers =

- Born: December 3, 1949 (age 76); Philadelphia, Pennsylvania

Academic background
- Education: B.A. University of California, Santa Cruz Ph.D. Harvard University, 1986
- Influences: Karl Polanyi

Academic work
- Notable works: Genealogies of Citizenship: Markets, Statelessness, and the Right to Have Rights (Cambridge 2008)

Margaret R. Somers is an American sociologist and Professor of Sociology and History at the University of Michigan She is the recipient of the inaugural Lewis A. Coser Award for Innovation and Theoretical Agenda-Setting in Sociology, Somers's work specializes in historical, political, economic, and cultural sociology and social theory.

== Biography ==
Somers received a MA from Harvard University in Sociology in 1981, and a Ph.D. from the same university in 1986.

== Publications ==
- Genealogies of Citizenship: Markets, Statelessness, and the Right to Have Rights (Cambridge 2008) won the 2009 APSA Giovanni Sartori Qualitative Methods Award. According to WorldCat, the book is held in 342 libraries

Reviewed in :

- Katz, Michael B. (April 2011). "On Genealogies of Citizenship by Margaret Somers". Socio-Economic Review. 9 (2). Oxford Journals: 395–418. doi:10.1093/ser/mwr001.
- Lemert, Charles (November 2011). "Genealogies of Citizenship: Markets, Statelessness and the Right to Have Rights by Margaret R. Somers". American Journal of Sociology. 117 (3). University of Chicago Press: 989–991. doi:10.1086/662956. JSTOR 10.1086/662956.
- Turner, Bryan S. (September 2011). "Margaret R. Somers Genealogies of Citizenship: Markets, Statelessness and the Right to Have Rights". Cultural Sociology. 5 (3). Sage: 447–448. doi:10.1177/1749975511410000. S2CID 143100873.
- Shaver, Sheila (May 2011). "Margaret R. Somers Genealogies of Citizenship: Markets, Statelessness and the Right to Have Rights. (Cambridge, Cambridge University Press, 2008)". Thesis Eleven. 105 (1). Sage: 130–134. doi:10.1177/0725513611407462. S2CID 147061066.
- Sirianni, Carmen (May 2010). "Big Rights, Small Citizens: Genealogies of Citizenship: Markets, Statelessness and the Right to Have Rights by Margaret R. Somers". Contemporary Sociology. 10 (3). Sage: 259–262. doi:10.1177/0094306110367908. JSTOR 20695406. S2CID 147307408.

- Block, Fred L., and Margaret R. Somers. The Power of Market Fundamentalism: Karl Polanyi's Critique. 2014. According to WorldCat, the book is held in 264 libraries
