= Lety =

Lety may refer to:

== Places in the Czech Republic ==
- Lety (Písek District), a municipality and village in the South Bohemian Region
  - Lety concentration camp, located in the municipality during World War II
- Lety (Prague-West District), a municipality and village in the Central Bohemian Region

== People ==
- Lety López, Mexican actress and singer
