= Polányi =

Polányi, Polanyi is a surname. There have been a number of prominent individuals in the Polanyi family, illustrated in the following family tree:

- Adolf Pollacsek (1820–1871) ⚭ (married to) Zsófia Schlesinger
  - Mihály Pollacsek (March 21, 1848, Dluha (Dlhá nad Oravou) – January 10, 1905, Budapest), prominent member of the bourgeoisie involved in railroads
    ⚭ (1881 in Warsaw) Cecília Wohl (Hungarian: Pollacsek Mihályné, Wohl Cecília, French: Cécile Wohl; 1862, Vilnius – 1939, Budapest), daughter of Lithuanian Rabbi Alex Wohl, held a literary salon in Budapest
    - Laura Polanyi, later Striker (1882–1957), ⚭ Sándor Striker
      - Eva Striker Zeisel, American industrial designer
    - Adolf Polányi
    - Karl Paul Polanyi (Hungarian: Polányi Károly, 1886, Vienna – 1964, Pickering, Ontario), a Hungarian-Canadian political economist and author of The Great Transformation
      ⚭ Ilona Duczyńska
      - Kari Polanyi Levitt (born 1923, Vienna), the Emerita Professor of Economics at McGill University
    - Sophia (Zsófia) Polányi
    - Michael Polanyi (Hungarian: Polányi Mihály; 1891, Budapest – 1976, Manchester), Hungarian chemist, philosopher of science, economist
      ⚭ Magda Elizabeth Polanyi
      - John Charles Polanyi (Hungarian: Polányi János Károly; born 1929, Berlin), Canadian Nobel Prize winner in Chemistry
    - Paul (Pál) Polányi
  - Lujza Pollacsek
    - Ervin Szabó (1877–1918)
  - Vilma Pollacsek
    - Irma Seidler, early love of György Lukács
    - Ernő Seidler, founding member of the Communist Party of Hungary

== Other ==
The name is also referenced in:

- Michael Polanyi Center (MPC), Baylor University
- The Eyring-Polanyi equation
- Bell–Evans–Polanyi principle

== See also ==
- Polany (disambiguation)
- Poľany
- Polány
- Magyarpolány
