= Hodonín (disambiguation) =

Hodonín is a town in the South Moravian Region of the Czech Republic.

Hodonín may also refer to places in the Czech Republic:

- Hodonín (Blansko District), a municipality and village in the South Moravian Region
- Hodonín (Chrudim District), a municipality and village in the Pardubice Region
- Hodonín, a village and part of Zdíkov in the South Bohemian Region
- Hodonín District, a district around the town of Hodonín
