= Romani people in Czechoslovakia =

After World War I, the Romani people in Czechoslovakia formed an ethnic community, living on the social periphery of the mainstream Czechoslovak population.

== First Republic ==
The state always focused on the Romani population not as a distinct ethnic minority, but rather perceived it as a particularly anti-social and criminal group. This attitude was reflected in the policy of collecting special police evidence—fingerprint collections of members of Romani groups (1925), and a law about wandering Romani (1927).

== World War II ==
During the Nazi occupation of Czechoslovakia in World War II, Romani were exterminated by Nazi mobile killing units and in camps such as Lety, Hodonín and Auschwitz. In the Czech areas of the country, 90% of native Romani were killed during the war; the Romani in modern-day Czech Republic are mostly post-war immigrants from Slovakia or Hungary and their descendants.

== Socialist Republic ==
=== Attempts at integration ===
The communist government of 1945–1989 attempted to integrate the Romani into the majority population through obligatory education and employment, and the formation of Romani organizations. Romani people were forced to resettle in small groups around the country, leaving them isolated. Parts of the Romani population were also transferred from Slovakia into the country's Czech regions. This policy of the state was oriented toward assimilation of the Romani people. Many Romani people were rehoused in panelák housing estates, which subsequently fell into acute disrepair, such as the Chanov housing estate in Most, and Luník IX in Košice. In 1958, Law No. 74, "On the permanent settlement of nomadic and semi-nomadic people"), forcibly limited the movements of those Romani (around 5–10%) who still travelled on a regular basis. In the same year, the highest organ of the Communist Party of Czechoslovakia passed a resolution, the aim of which was to be "the final assimilation of the Gypsy population". The popular perception of Romani even before 1989 was of lazy, dirty criminals who abused social services and posed a significant threat to majority values. The "Gypsy question" was considered a "problem of a socially-backward section of the population". During this period, the governments actively supported sterilisation and abortion for Romani women and the policy was not repealed until 1991.

=== Forced sterilisation ===
Attempts to stop the growth of the Romani population were made, especially in Slovakia, where Romani women were offered financial incentives for sterilization. After 1989, some Romani women accused the state of "forced sterilizations" arguing that they were not properly informed of what "sterilization" meant. According to Czech ombudsman Otakar Motejl, "at least 50 Romani women were unlawfully sterilized". The Czech representative at the United Nations protested against the accusations, claiming that they were "false" and that Romani women "exaggerate in all cases". A hospital in Vitkovice, Ostrava, apologised to a Romani woman who was sterilised after her second caesarean, but a request for a compensation of 1 million Czech crowns was rejected by the court.

== See also ==
- Romani people in the Czech Republic
- Romani people in Slovakia
