= Polansky =

Polansky may be either the Czech surname Polanský (feminine: Polanská) or a foreign spelling of the Polish surname Polański. Notable people with the surname include:

- Adrian Polansky (born c. 1950), American politician
- David Polansky (1919–2003), American basketball coach
- Jiří Polanský (born 1981), Czech ice hockey player
- Larry Polansky (1954–2024), American musician
- Mark L. Polansky (born 1956), American aerospace engineer and astronaut
- Paul Polansky (1942–2021), American writer and Romani activist
- Peter Polansky (born 1988), Canadian tennis player
- Ron Polansky, American philosopher
- Sol Polansky (1926–2016), American diplomat
- Tadeáš Polanský (1713–1770), Czech Jesuit and physicist
