= Bolinsky =

Bolinsky is a surname. It is the German spelling of the Polish surname Polinski.

People with the surname include

- David Bolinsky (born 1952), American artist
- Mitch Bolinsky (born 1958), American politician
