= Hodonín concentration camp =

Coordinates: 49°30′27″N 16°25′12″E

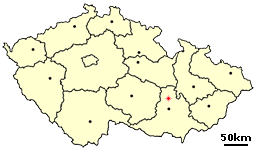
Location of Hodonín in the Czech Republic

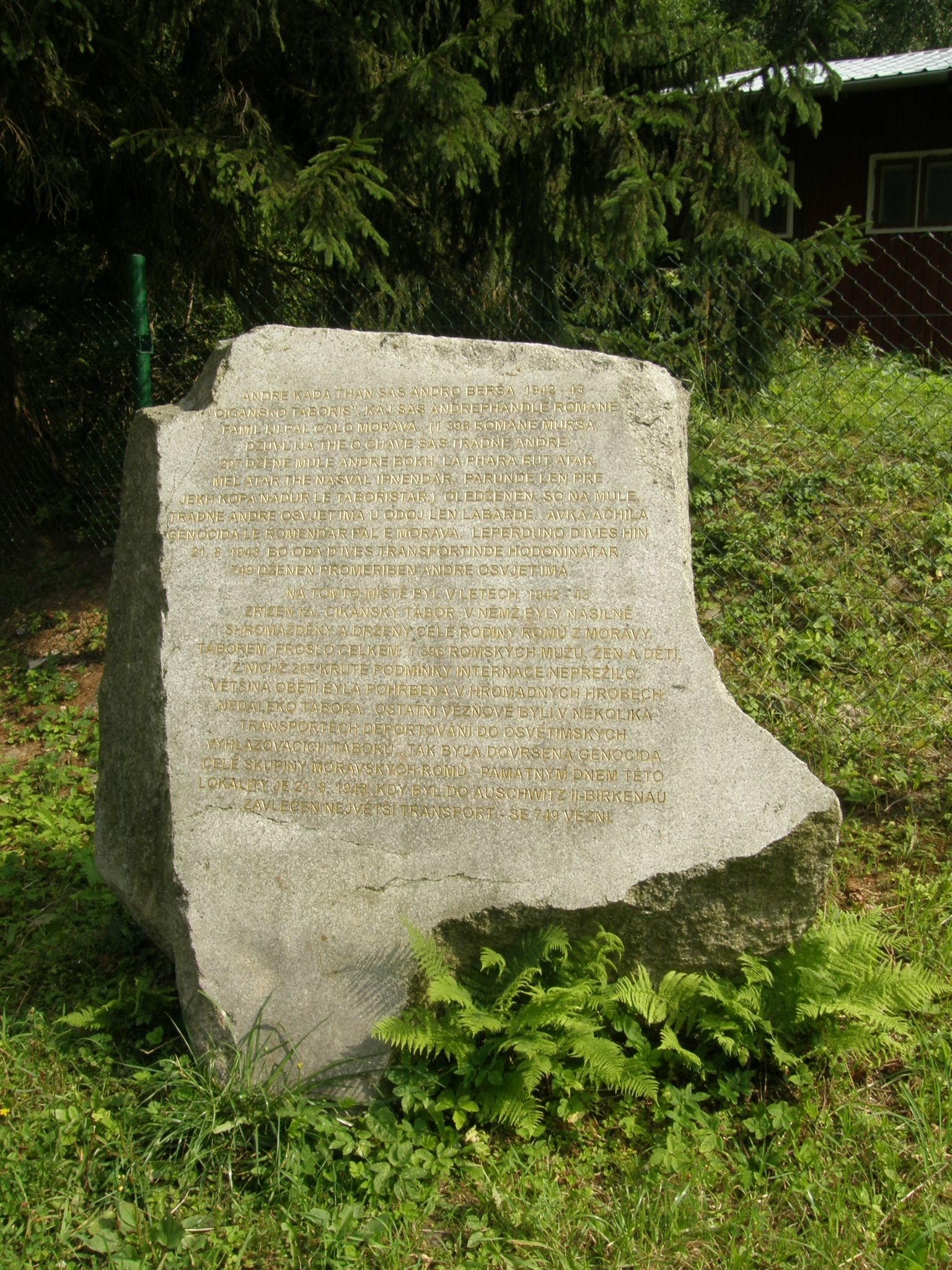
Memorial table

Hodonín concentration camp (also called Hodonínek) was a World War II internment camp in Hodonín for Romani people from the Protectorate of Bohemia and Moravia.

== Background ==
On 2 March 1939, (two weeks before the German occupation), the Czechoslovak government ordered that a labor camp be set up for "people avoiding work and living off crime" (at this time labour duty was mandatory).

The camp next to the village Hodonín was constructed later and was opened during August 1940. The camp consisted of several large and small wooden barracks, and were surrounded by a wooden fence with barbed wire on the top. Projected capacity of the camp was 300 people during summer, 200 during winter. New barracks were added later, lifting official capacity to 750 prisoners in 1943. Running water, sewage and electricity infrastructure was planned but never finished. Czech gendarmes (četníci) guarded the places (service in such camps was considered a disciplinary punishment). Štefan Blahynka, commander of Hodonín camp. Similar forced labor camps existed in Planá, Mirošov, Hradištko and other places; prisoners were typically used for hard labour such as road construction. In total, around 50,000 people went through such labour camps during the war. The total number of prisons and camps of all kinds within the boundaries of the modern-day Czech Republic was 2,125

Starting in 1940, Romanis were forbidden to travel. In 1942, the measures already in force in Germany were applied in the Protectorate as well and, as an immediate result, a few hundred people deemed "asocial" were deported to Auschwitz.

On 24 June 1942, the Protectorate Minister of the Interior, Richard Bienert, ordered the internment of all Romani and Sinti people in "gypsy camps" (Zigeunerlager). On 10 July, SS-Oberführer Horst Böhme, Chief of German Security Police, ordered Romanis to be moved into two camps: Lety and Hodonín.

== History of the camp ==
All pre-existing prisoners at Hodonín were released or transferred, except for seven Romani already imprisoned and six non-Romani. During the first month after it was re-opened, 1,229 people arrived. On 1 October 1942, the camp held 205 men, 287 women and 561 children and youths. Internees were assigned to work, typically on construction of local roads; those not performing were beaten. Like in Lety, the food and winter clothing provided was insufficient.

On 7 December 1942, 75 "asocials" were transported to Auschwitz. In December 1942, typhoid started to take its toll in the camp and by the next May, only 5–10% of internees were considered healthy. A lack of medicine to treat the disease, as well as the horrible hygienic conditions, kept the epidemic going for months. On 21 August 1943, 749 prisoners were transported to Auschwitz-Birkenau. Of the remaining 62 internees, some were released, and the rest were sent to Auschwitz in 1944.

Overall numbers:

- Over 1,300 prisoners passed through the camp
- 194 deaths
- At least 824 deported to Auschwitz

== Extermination at Auschwitz ==
During the course of the war, a total of 4,831 Romani from the Protectorate were sent to Auschwitz. Of those, few survived. Estimations vary, but well over 4,000 of them died there.

== Postwar investigations ==
When rumors about atrocities in the camp appeared after the war, Commander Blahynka wrote a statement in 1946 denying any wrongdoings. No official investigation against him had started. Former prisoner Blažej Dydy, acting as Kapo (a supervisor of other prisoners) in Hodonín and Auschwitz, was sentenced to life in prison in 1947 for theft and the murder of other inmates.

== Forgotten and rediscovered history ==
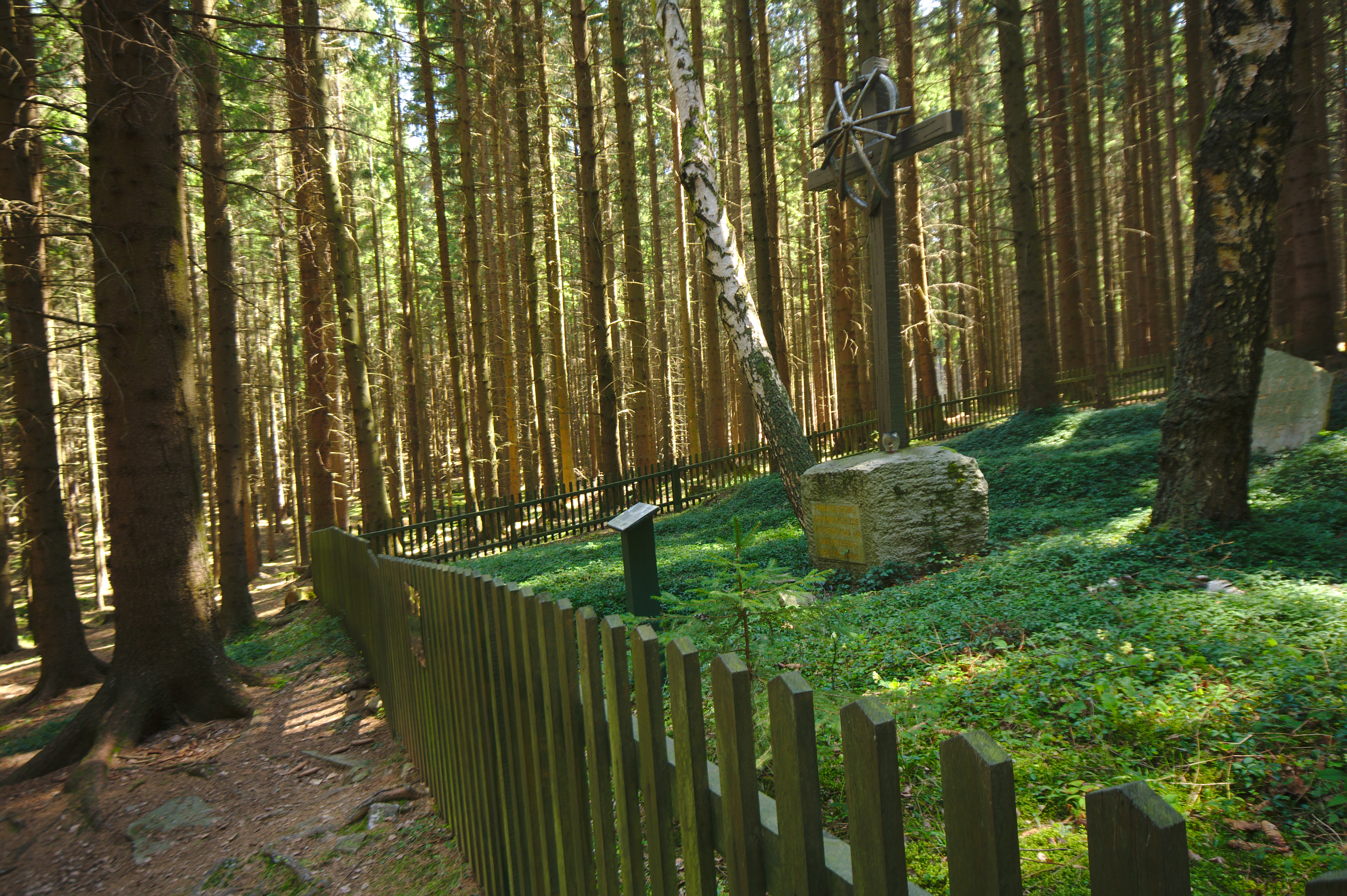
Memorial cross at Hodonín

After the war, the existence of Romani camps was practically forgotten outside the Romani community, except by specialized historians. The whole community of Czech Romani was annihilated and the new ones, who came from Slovakia and Romania, had no knowledge about this tragedy. During the 1970s, a large factory pig farm was constructed near the place of Lety camp. In place of Hodonín camp, a tourist hotel has been built.

In 1992 the book Black Silence by Paul Polansky compiled historical records and testimonials of survivors. The book started heated discussions in the Czech Republic about Czech relations to the Romani and their history.

== See also ==
- Lety concentration camp
- Romani Holocaust
