= Polanski =

Polański (Polish pronunciation: [pɔˈlaɲski], feminine: Polańska) is a Polish surname derived from the places named Polana or Polany. An early mention of the surname dates to 1514. Outside Poland it may be rendered as "Polanski" or "Polansky". Notable people with the surname include:

- Aleksandra Polańska (born 2000), Polish swimmer
- Eugen Polanski (born 1986), Polish-German footballer
- Gabriela Polańska (born 1988), Polish volleyball player
- Henriette Brossin de Polanska (1878–1954), French painter
- John Polanski (1918–1956), American football player
- Łukasz Polański (born 1989), Polish volleyball player
- Morgane Polanski (born 1993), French actress
- Roman Polanski (born 1933), Polish-French film director
- Zack Polanski (born 1982), British politician

== Fictional characters ==
- Polaris P. Polanski, a fictional alias in Yuya Sato's Danganronpa: Togami trilogy

== See also ==
- Polansky
- Polianskyi
- Polonsky
