= Polanski (disambiguation) =

Roman Polanski (born 1933) is a Polish-French film director.

Polanski may also refer to:

- Polanski (surname), others named Polanski or Polansky
- Polanski Unauthorized, a biopic by Damian Chapa
