= Polonsky =

Polonsky (Russian: Полонский, Ukrainian: Полонський) is a surname. It is quite common in Russia, Ukraine and Belarus. The name independently appeared in Russia and Ukraine, and in the Polish–Lithuanian Commonwealth, and a little later was used by Polish Jews. The first mention of the surname comes from 16th century Polish genealogy books as a name of an old Lithuanian family Połoński that belonged to Leliwa coat of arms. The origin of the name is attributed to Latin polonus 'Polish', or to villages Polonka, Polonnoye or Polonsk in modern Belarus.

Notable people with this name include:

== Polonsky ==
- Abraham Polonsky (1910–1999), American film director and novelist
- Antony Polonsky (born 1940), American professor of Holocaust studies
- Arthur Polonsky (1925–2019), American painter
- David Polonsky (born 1973), Ukraine-born Israeli book illustrator an artistic film director
- Gary Polonsky (born 1942), Canadian university president
- Lea Polonsky (born 2002), Israeli swimmer
- Leonid Polonsky (1833–1913) Russian writer and journalist
- Luciano Palonsky (born 1999), Argentine professional volleyball player
- Pinchas Polonsky (born 1958), Russian-Israeli religious philosopher and researcher
- Sergei Polonsky (born 1972), Russian businessman
- Vitold Polonsky (1879–1919), Russian silent film actor
- Vladimir Polonsky (1893–1937), First Secretary of Azerbaijan Communist Party
- Vyacheslav Polonsky (1886–1932), Russian critic, journalist and historian.
- Yakov Polonsky (1819–1898), Russian Pushkinist poet
- Yevgeny Polonsky (died 1919), Ukrainian Red Army soldier

== Polonski ==
- Abraham Polonski (1913–?), Russian French Resistance member
- Dominik Połoński (1976–2018), Polish cellist

== Polonska, Polonskaya ==
- Elizaveta Polonskaya (1890–1969), Russian poet
- Elena Kazimirtchak-Polonskaïa (Olena Ivanivna Kazymyrchak-Polonska), Soviet astronomer
- Marina Polonskaya, pseudonym of Maria Olovennikova, Russian Narodnik revolutionary
- Nataliia Polonska-Vasylenko, Ukrainian historian
- 2006 Polonskaya, a main-belt asteroid, named after the former

== See also ==
- Polonsky conspiracy, a Bolshevik attempted coup in Ukraine
- Polonskyi Raion, a former administrative district in Ukraine
