= Polany =

Polany may refer to:

- Polány, Hungary
- Polany, Lesser Poland Voivodeship (south Poland)
- Polany, Lublin Voivodeship (east Poland)
- Polany, Subcarpathian Voivodeship (south-east Poland)
- Polany, Masovian Voivodeship (east-central Poland)
- Polany, Warmian-Masurian Voivodeship (north Poland)

== See also ==
- Poľany
- Polányi
