= Romani people in the Czech Republic =

Ethnic group

Romane manusha ando Cheho (Romani)
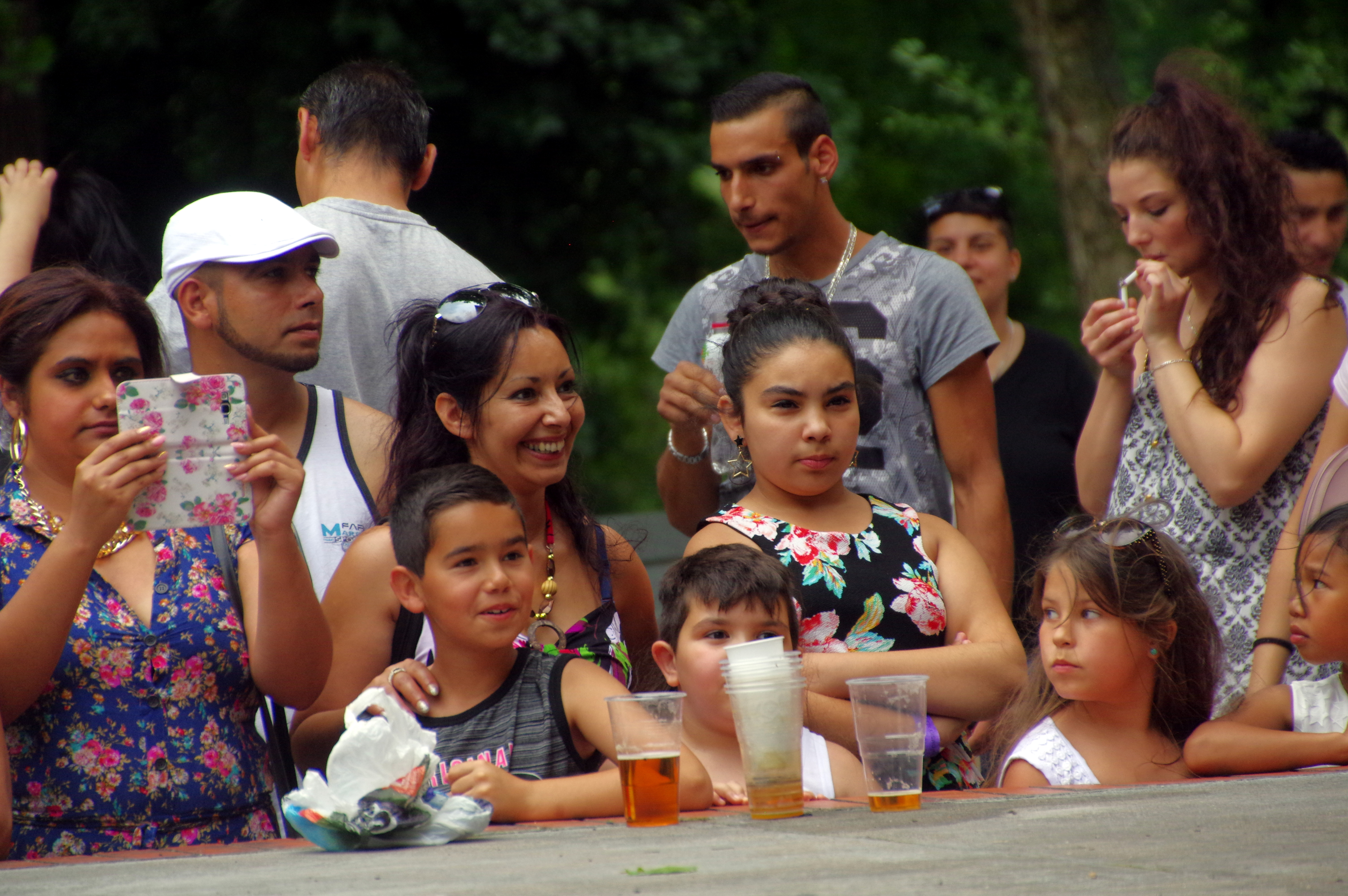
- Romani people in the Czech Republic, 2016

Total population
- ≈ 40,370 - ~250,000

Regions with significant populations
- Industrial cities or near the mining areas of Moravia and North Bohemia

Languages
- Carpathian Romani, Czech; Historically Bohemian Romani

Religion
- Roman Catholicism

Romani people (Czech: Romové; commonly known as Gypsies, Czech: Cikáni) are an ethnic minority in the Czech Republic, currently making up around 2% of the population. Originally migrants from North Western India sometime between the 6th and 11th centuries, they have long had a presence in the region. Since the creation of Czechoslovakia in 1918, the Romani population have experienced considerable hardship, having been a main target of Nazi extermination programs during World War II, and the subject of forced relocation, sterilisation, and other radical social policies during the Communist era. In the successor state, the Czech Republic, challenges remain for the Romani population with respect to education and poverty, and there are frequent tensions with the white majority population over issues including crime and integration.

== Demographics ==
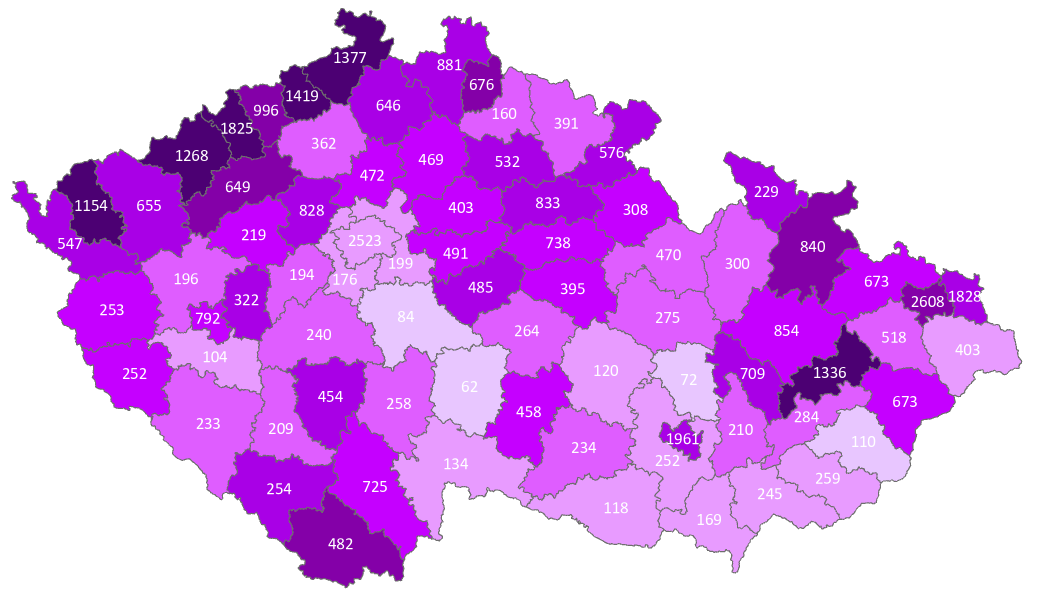
Distribution of Romani population in the Czech Republic

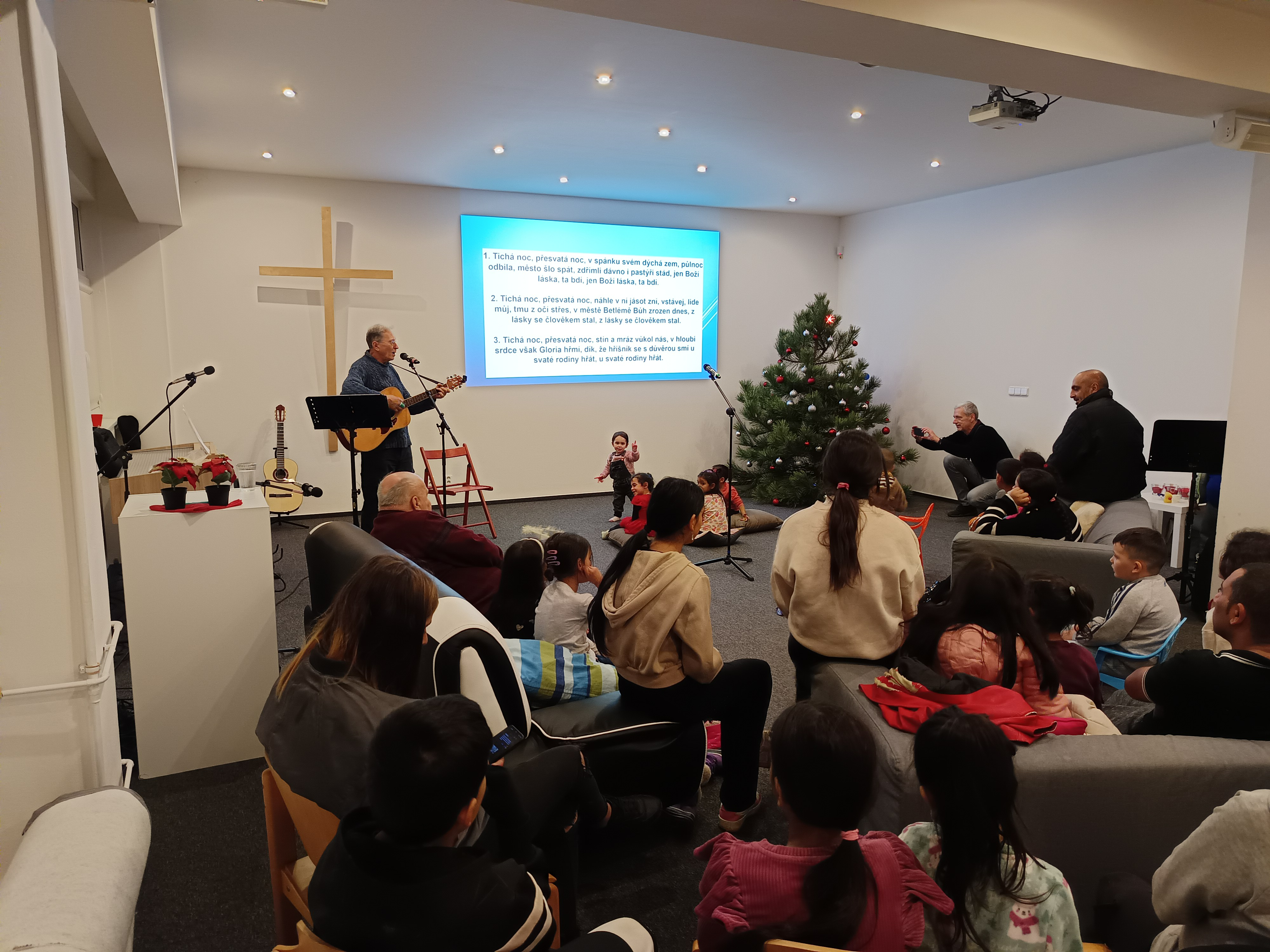
Romani Christians in Ostrava, 2024

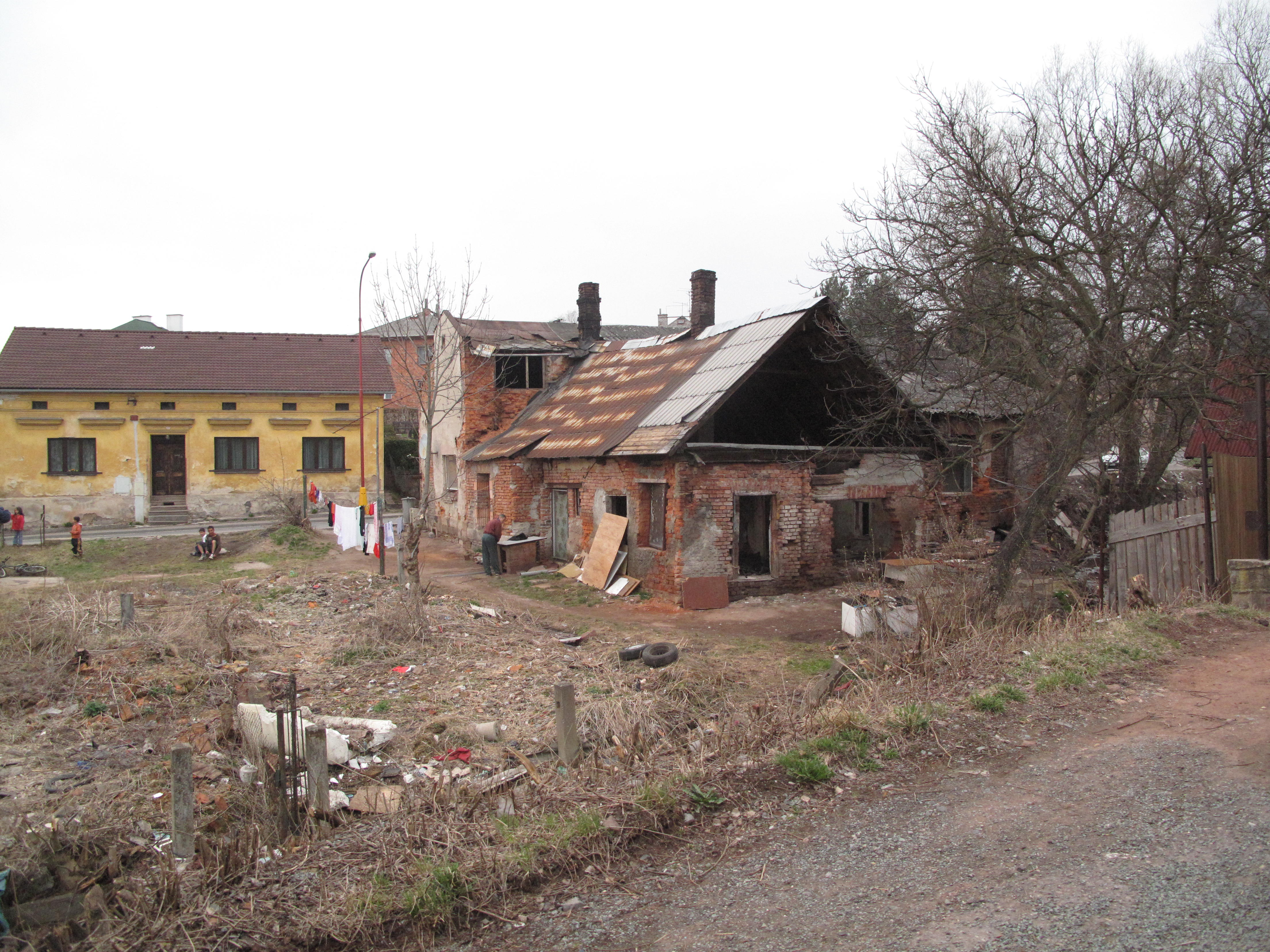
Building where Romani people are living in Červený Kostelec, 2011

In the 2001 Census, 11,746 people reported their nationality as Romani – 0.1% of those claiming some nationality. According to the 2011 census, the Romani population was 13,150, 0.2% of the total number reporting some nationality. Of these, 5,199 responded by listing only Romani nationality; the remaining 7,951 listed their Romani nationality in combination with another nationality, for example, Romani and Czech, Romani and Moravian and so on. 40,370 respondents to the 2011 census reported Romani language as their language.

A 2019 report estimated the number of Romani people in the Czech Republic at 262,000.

== History ==
=== Origin ===
The Romani people originate from Northern India, most likely from the northwestern Indian states Rajasthan and Punjab. Linguistic evidence indicates that the roots of Romani language lie in India; the language shares grammatical characteristics with Indian languages, as well as a large part of the basic lexicon, such as body parts or daily routines. More specifically, Romani shares its basic lexicon with Hindi and Punjabi. It shares many phonetic features with Marwari, while its grammar is closest to Bengali.

The results of a genetic study in 2012 suggest that the Romani originated in North Western India and migrated as a group. The study indicates that the ancestors of present scheduled tribes and scheduled caste populations of North India, traditionally referred to collectively as the Ḍoma, are the likely ancestors of modern European Roma.

=== World War II ===
During the Nazi occupation of Czechoslovakia in World War II, Romani were exterminated by Nazi mobile killing units and in camps such as Lety, Hodonín and Auschwitz. 90% of native Romani were killed during the war; the Romani in modern-day Czech Republic are mostly post-war immigrants from Slovakia or Hungary and their descendants. The postwar migration of Romani people from Slovakia to the Czech Republic is considered a consequence of the Romani genocide as well as increased opportunities in the Czech Republic following World War II.

=== Communist era ===
During the communist years unsuccessful attempts to change the nomadic living style of Romani were undertaken by the government. Many Romani people were rehoused in panelák housing estates, which subsequently fell into acute disrepair, such as the Chánov housing estate in Most. After 1989, some Romani women accused the state of "forced sterilizations" arguing that they were not properly informed of what "sterilization" meant. According to Czech ombudsman Otakar Motejl, "at least 50 Romani women were unlawfully sterilized". The Czech representative at the United Nations protested against the accusations, claiming that they were "false" and that Romani women "exaggerate in all cases". A hospital in Vitkovice, Ostrava, apologised to a Romani woman who was sterilised after her second caesarean, but a request for a compensation of 1 million Czech crowns was rejected by the court.

== Emigration ==
Many Romani left the country after the independence of the Czech Republic, saying that they felt unsafe due to a surge in right-wing activity. Countries such as Ireland, the UK, Norway and Sweden took in large numbers, but most Romani returned home after a few years. Immigration rates to Great Britain dropped suddenly after financial support for refugees started to be paid out in the form of food tickets in summer 2000 (due to the Immigration and Asylum Act 1999). The following year, British customs officers began to check the passengers flying to the UK from Prague airport and routinely rejected those of Romani origin. In October 1997, after receiving over 1,000 requests for asylum from Czech Roma within a single year, Canada reinstated a visa regime for Czech citizens.

== Anti-ziganism ==
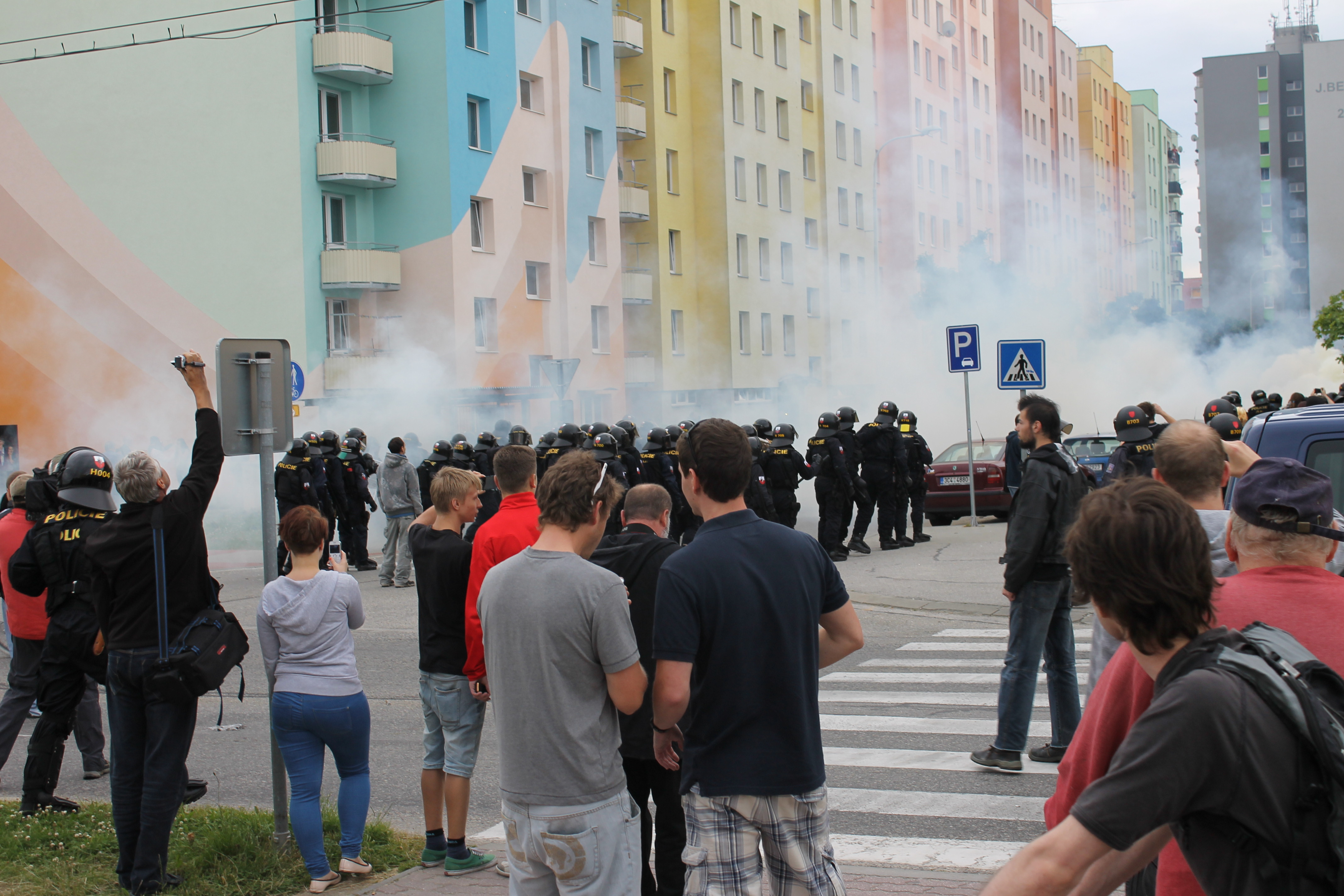
Violent anti-Roma protests in České Budějovice in 2013

The Romanis are at the centre of the agenda of far-right groups in the Czech Republic, which spread anti-ziganism. One highly publicized case was the Vítkov arson attack of 2009, in which four right-wing extremists seriously injured a three-year-old Romani girl. The public responded by donating money as well as presents to the family, who were able to buy a new house from the donations, while the perpetrators were sentenced to 18 and 22 years in prison.

In January 2010, Amnesty International launched a report titled Injustice Renamed: Discrimination in Education of Roma persists in the Czech Republic. According to the BBC, Amnesty argued that while cosmetic changes had been introduced by the authorities, little genuine improvement in addressing discrimination against Romani children had occurred.

According to a 2010 opinion poll, 68% of Czechs have antipathy towards Romani. The survey also found that 82% Czechs oppose any form of a "special care of Roma rights", 83% of Czechs consider Romani asocial, and 45% of Czechs would support the expulsion of Romani people from the Czech Republic.

A 2011 poll, which followed a number of violent attacks by Romani perpetrators against ethnic Czech victims, reported that 44% of Czechs are afraid of Roma people. The majority of Czechs (90%) do not want Romani people as neighbours, viewing them as thieves and social parasites. Despite a long waiting list for adoptive parents, Romani children from orphanages are almost never adopted by Czech couples. After the Velvet Revolution in 1989, jobs traditionally employing Romanis either disappeared or were taken over by immigrant workers.

In 2013, numerous violent Anti-Roma protests took place across the Czech Republic.

A 2019 Pew Research poll found that 66% of Czechs held unfavorable views of Roma.

== Culture ==
=== Music ===
Romani hip-hop is popular in the Czech Republic. One prominent hip-hop group is Gipsy.cz, who represented the Czech Republic at the 2009 Eurovision Song Contest.

=== Cuisine ===
AMBIX is a Romani restaurant in Prague. It serves Romani dishes such as halusky, pierogie and marikl'l, a Romani frybread.

== Crime ==
Crime statistics from the early 1990s reported that the crime rate among the Romani population in Czechoslovakia was highly disproportionate, especially regarding burglaries. According to Říčan (1998), about 20–30% of the Romani population earn their livelihood in illegal ways, such as procuring prostitution, trafficking and other property crimes. Romani make up more than 60% of the Czech prison population and about 50% of repeat offenders, and are thus more than 20 times over-represented in Czech prisons than their population share would suggest.

== Notable people ==
- Elena Gorolová, human rights defender
- Věra Bílá, singer
- Monika Bagárová, singer
- Jan Cina, actor
- Václav Sivák, kickboxer
- Milan Baroš, footballer

== See also ==
- Romani people in Czechoslovakia
- D.H. and Others v. the Czech Republic
