= List of Polana species =

This is a list of 143 species in Polana, a genus of leafhoppers in the family Cicadellidae.

== Polana species ==
- Polana agrilla DeLong & Freytag 1972^{c g}
- Polana alata DeLong & Freytag 1972^{c g}
- Polana alia DeLong & Freytag 1972^{c g}
- Polana alitera DeLong & Freytag 1972^{c g}
- Polana amapaensis Coelho 1991^{c g}
- Polana ancistra Freytag 2007^{c g}
- Polana aneza DeLong & Freytag 1972^{c g}
- Polana ardua DeLong & Freytag 1972^{c g}
- Polana aspersa DeLong & Freytag 1972^{c g}
- Polana assula DeLong & Freytag 1972^{c g}
- Polana belema DeLong 1984^{c g}
- Polana bena DeLong & Freytag 1972^{c g}
- Polana bicolor Spångberg 1878^{c g}
- Polana bidens DeLong & Freytag 1972^{c g}
- Polana bitubera DeLong & Foster 1982^{c g}
- Polana bohemani Stål 1864^{c g}
- Polana boquetea DeLong & Wolda 1984^{c g}
- Polana brevis Freytag 2007^{c g}
- Polana bruneola Osborn 1938^{c g}
- Polana bulba DeLong & Freytag 1972^{c g}
- Polana calvanoa DeLong & Wolda 1984^{c g}
- Polana caputa DeLong 1980^{c g}
- Polana carla DeLong 1980^{c g}
- Polana celata Fowler 1903^{c g}
- Polana celsa DeLong & Freytag 1972^{c g}
- Polana censora DeLong & Wolda 1984^{c g}
- Polana chelata DeLong & Freytag 1972^{c g}
- Polana chena DeLong & Wolda 1978^{c g}
- Polana chifama DeLong & Freytag 1972^{c g}
- Polana clarita DeLong & Wolda 1982^{c g}
- Polana clavata DeLong & Wolda 1984^{c g}
- Polana cochlea DeLong 1980^{c g}
- Polana concinna Stål 1862^{c g}
- Polana confusa DeLong 1984^{c g}
- Polana coresa DeLong & Freytag 1972^{c g}
- Polana coverra DeLong 1979^{c g}
- Polana cumbresa DeLong & Wolda 1984^{c g}
- Polana cupida DeLong & Freytag 1972^{c g}
- Polana danesa DeLong & Freytag 1972^{c g}
- Polana declivata Freytag 2007^{c g}
- Polana desela DeLong 1979^{c g}
- Polana dispara DeLong & Freytag 1972^{c g}
- Polana diversita DeLong & Wolda 1982^{c g}
- Polana docera DeLong & Wolda 1982^{c g}
- Polana elabora DeLong & Freytag 1972^{c g}
- Polana elera DeLong & Freytag 1972^{c g}
- Polana exornata Fowler 1903^{c g}
- Polana extranea Fowler 1903^{c g}
- Polana falsa DeLong & Freytag 1972^{c g}
- Polana fenestra DeLong 1984^{c g}
- Polana fetera DeLong & Freytag 1972^{c g}
- Polana fina DeLong & Freytag 1972^{c g}
- Polana flectara DeLong & Freytag 1972^{c g}
- Polana fusconotata Osborn 1938^{c g}
- Polana gatunana DeLong & Wolda 1984^{c g}
- Polana gelera DeLong & Freytag 1972^{c g}
- Polana gomezi DeLong 1979^{c g}
- Polana gracilis Spångberg 1883^{c g}
- Polana helara DeLong & Freytag 1972^{c g}
- Polana helvola DeLong 1979^{c g}
- Polana icara DeLong & Freytag 1972^{c g}
- Polana inclinata DeLong & Freytag 1972^{c g}
- Polana inimica DeLong & Freytag 1972^{c g}
- Polana insulana Freytag & Cwikla 1982^{c g}
- Polana insulia DeLong 1984^{c g}
- Polana intricata ^{g}
- Polana julna DeLong & Wolda 1982^{c g}
- Polana laca DeLong & Freytag 1972^{c g}
- Polana lamina DeLong 1979^{c g}
- Polana lanara DeLong & Freytag 1972^{c g}
- Polana lerana DeLong & Triplehorn 1979^{c g}
- Polana luteonota DeLong 1979^{c g}
- Polana macuella DeLong & Freytag 1972^{c g}
- Polana macula DeLong & Freytag 1972^{c g}
- Polana mala DeLong & Freytag 1972^{c g}
- Polana melalbida DeLong 1979^{c g}
- Polana melella DeLong 1979^{c g}
- Polana mella DeLong & Freytag 1972^{c g}
- Polana merga DeLong & Freytag 1972^{c g}
- Polana minima Freytag 2007^{c g}
- Polana miramara DeLong & Wolda 1984^{c g}
- Polana naja ^{g}
- Polana nebulosa Stål 1862^{c g}
- Polana nida DeLong & Freytag 1972^{c g}
- Polana nidula DeLong & Freytag 1972^{c g}
- Polana nigrolabes DeLong & Wolda 1978^{c g}
- Polana nisa DeLong & Freytag 1972^{c g}
- Polana obliqua DeLong & Freytag 1972^{c g}
- Polana obtecta DeLong & Freytag 1972^{c g}
- Polana obtusa Spångberg 1878^{c g}
- Polana ocellata Spångberg 1878^{c g}
- Polana onara DeLong & Triplehorn 1979^{c g}
- Polana optata DeLong & Freytag 1972^{c g}
- Polana orbita DeLong & Freytag 1972^{c g}
- Polana orcula DeLong & Foster 1982^{c g}
- Polana ordinaria Freytag 2007^{c g}
- Polana pandara DeLong & Freytag 1972^{c g}
- Polana papillata Freytag & Cwikla 1982^{c g}
- Polana parca DeLong & Freytag 1972^{c g}
- Polana parvula DeLong & Freytag 1972^{c g}
- Polana peda DeLong & Freytag 1972^{c g}
- Polana pendula DeLong & Freytag 1972^{c g}
- Polana pensa DeLong & Freytag 1972^{c g}
- Polana piceata Osborn 1938^{c g}
- Polana plumea DeLong & Freytag 1972^{c g}
- Polana portochuela DeLong & Foster 1982^{c g}
- Polana praeusta Stål 1854^{c g}
- Polana pressa DeLong & Freytag 1972^{c g}
- Polana principia DeLong & Freytag 1972^{c g}
- Polana putara DeLong 1979^{c g}
- Polana quadrilabes DeLong & Freytag 1972^{c g}
- Polana quadrina DeLong 1979^{c g}
- Polana quadrinotata (Spangberg, 1878)^{c g b}
- Polana quadripunctata Stål 1862^{c g}
- Polana quatara DeLong & Freytag 1972^{c g}
- Polana randa DeLong & Freytag 1972^{c g}
- Polana raseca DeLong & Triplehorn 1979^{c g}
- Polana resilara DeLong & Freytag 1972^{c g}
- Polana resupina DeLong & Freytag 1972^{c g}
- Polana retenta DeLong & Freytag 1972^{c g}
- Polana rixa DeLong & Freytag 1972^{c g}
- Polana robusta DeLong 1980^{c g}
- Polana ruppeli DeLong & Freytag 1972^{c g}
- Polana sana DeLong 1979^{c g}
- Polana scela DeLong & Freytag 1972^{c g}
- Polana scina DeLong & Freytag 1972^{c g}
- Polana scruta DeLong & Freytag 1972^{c g}
- Polana sereta DeLong & Freytag 1972^{c g}
- Polana solida DeLong 1979^{c g}
- Polana spindella DeLong & Freytag 1972^{c g}
- Polana squalera DeLong & Freytag 1972^{c g}
- Polana thugana DeLong & Triplehorn 1979^{c g}
- Polana tinae DeLong & Wolda 1982^{c g}
- Polana tortora DeLong 1980^{c g}
- Polana tropica DeLong & Triplehorn 1979^{c g}
- Polana truncata DeLong & Freytag 1972^{c g}
- Polana tuberana DeLong & Foster 1982^{c g}
- Polana tulara DeLong & Freytag 1972^{c g}
- Polana unca DeLong & Freytag 1972^{c g}
- Polana vana DeLong & Freytag 1972^{c g}
- Polana venosa Stål 1854^{c g}
- Polana villa DeLong & Freytag 1972^{c g}
- Polana villara DeLong 1979^{c g}

Data sources: i = ITIS, c = Catalogue of Life, g = GBIF, b = Bugguide.net
