= Polana =

Polana may refer to the following places:

== Places ==
- Polana, Lower Silesian Voivodeship (south-west Poland)
- Polana, Subcarpathian Voivodeship (south-east Poland)
- Polana, Opole Voivodeship (south-west Poland)
- Polana, Pomeranian Voivodeship (north Poland)
- Polana, Ukraine, village in Khmelnytskyi Raion, Khmelnytskyi Oblast
- Polana, Murska Sobota, village in Slovenia

== Other ==
- Poľana, a mountain range in central Slovakia or a hill in this range with same name
- 142 Polana, an asteroid, namesake of the Polana subgroup in the Nysa family
- Polana, a genus of leafhoppers
