= Cecília Wohl =

Lithuanian-Hungarian salonist (1862–1939)

Cecília Wohl (Hungarian: Polacsek Mihályné; Wohl Cecília, French: Cécile Wohl, aka Cecil Wohl; 1862, Vilnius – 5 September 1939, Budapest district 1) was a Lithuanian-Viennese master, Budapestian salonist known as "Cecil mama", a daughter of the senior teacher of Jewish history at the Vilna rabbinic seminary Osher Leyzerovich Vol, (Note: See detailed genealogical information on the Vol family at JewishGen.org (Lithuania database).) and the mother of Karl Polanyi and Michael Polanyi.

== See also ==
- Polányi (family)
