= Berlin-Marzahn concentration camp =

Nazi forced labor camp for Romani and Sinti

Coordinates: 52°33′05″N 13°32′47″E

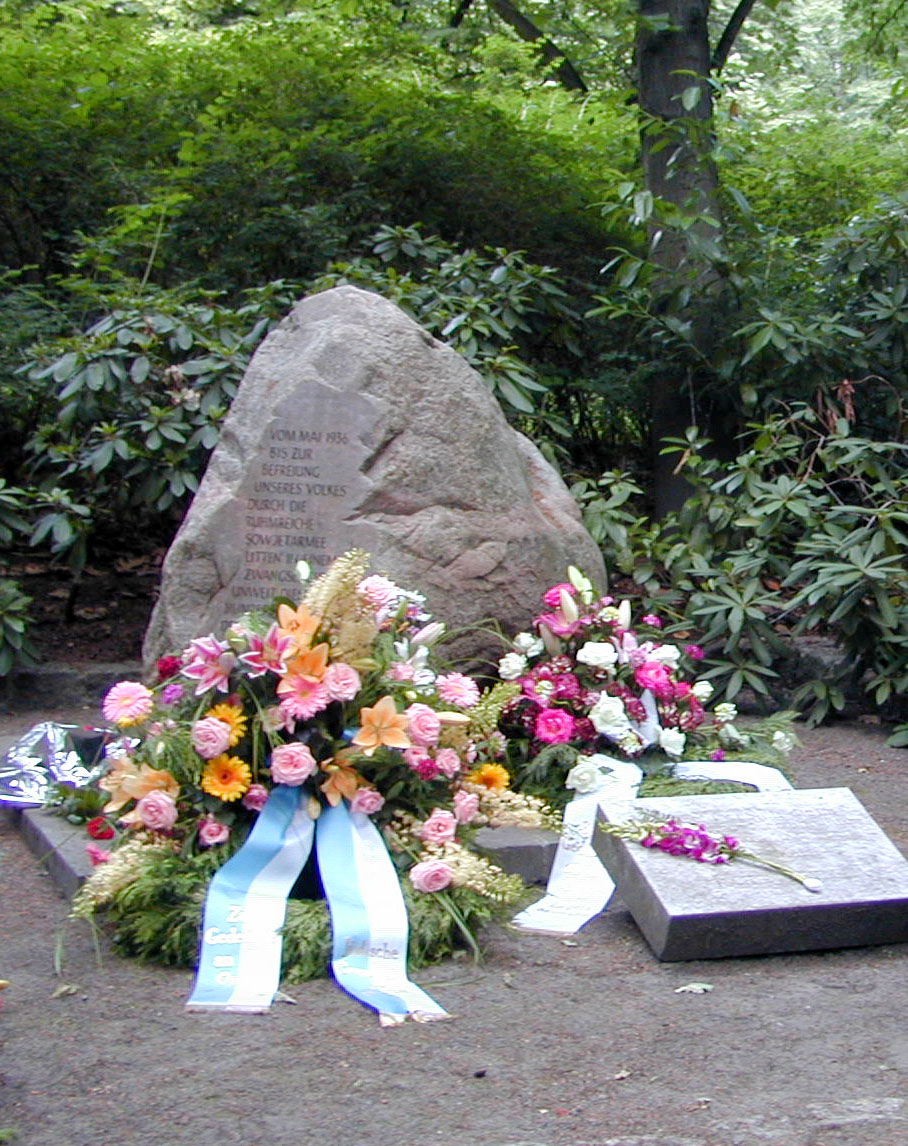
Memorial stone on the nearby cemetery, commemorating the camp

Berlin-Marzahn Rastplatz was a Zigeunerlager ("Gypsy camp") set up for Romani people in the Berlin suburb of Marzahn by Nazi authorities.

The Nazis used the Nuremberg Laws related to social misfits, vagabonds, and criminals as a means to intimidate and arrest Romani and Sinti Romani in Germany. At 4 a.m. on 16 July 1936, prior to the opening of the 1936 Berlin Olympics, police arrested 600 Romani in Greater Berlin and forcibly relocated them via 130 caravans to Marzahn, an open field in eastern Berlin sandwiched between a cemetery and a sewage dump. Upon arrival the men and women were separated and taken for medical inspection. From there, prisoners were either deemed fit to work or unfit. Those that were deemed unfit were sent to execution. Later, the prison would be surrounded by barbed wire and prisoners were subject to forced labour in armament plants. The camp also led to involuntary sterilization and loss of citizenship to the Romani prisoners as they were classified as aliens (non-Aryans).

Eventually, the men from Marzahn would be sent to Sachsenhausen concentration camp (in 1938), and women and children were sent to Auschwitz (in 1943).

== See also ==
- Porajmos
- The Holocaust
- List of concentration and internment camps
- List of Nazi concentration camps
