= Hodonín (Chrudim District) =

- Municipality
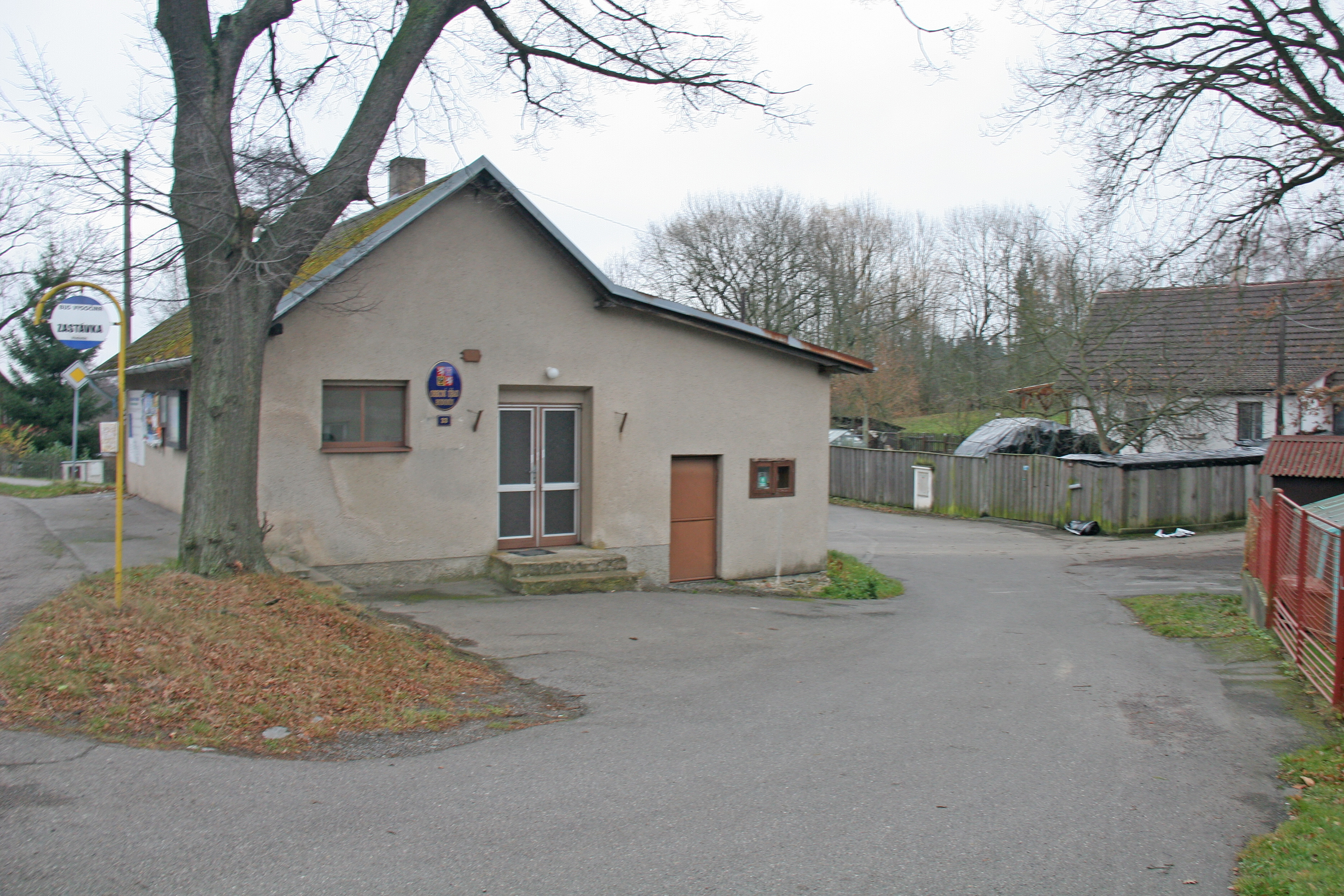
- Municipal office

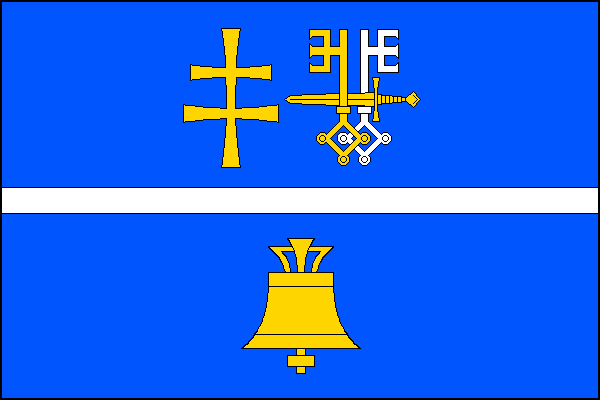
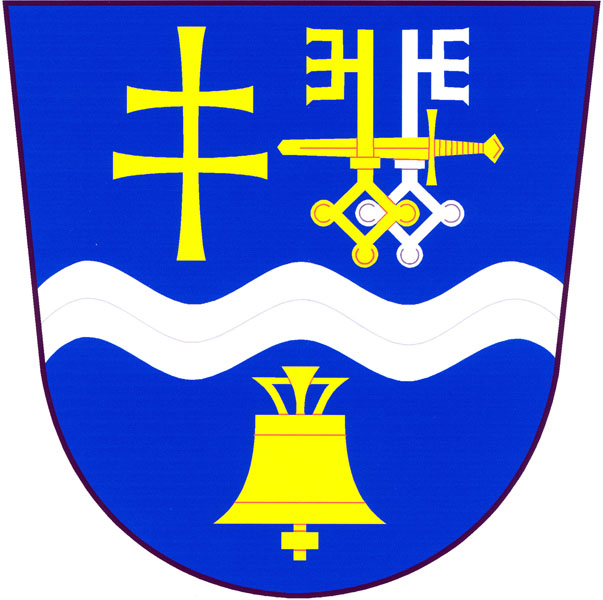
- Flag Coat of arms

- Location in the Czech Republic
- Coordinates: 49°50′13″N 15°47′14″E
- Country: Czech Republic
- Region: Pardubice
- District: Chrudim
- First mentioned: 1329

Area
  - Total: 6.95 km^{2} (2.68 sq mi)
- Elevation: 530 m (1,740 ft)

Population (2026-01-01)
  - Total: 82
  - Density: 12/km^{2} (31/sq mi)
- Time zone: UTC+1 (CET)
  - Summer (DST): UTC+2 (CEST)
- Postal code: 538 25
- Website: www.ouhodonin.cz

Hodonín (Czech pronunciation: [ˈɦodoɲiːn]) is a municipality and village in Chrudim District in the Pardubice Region of the Czech Republic. It has about 80 inhabitants.

== Demographics ==
Historical population
Year	Pop.	±%
1869	212	—
1880	209	−1.4%
1890	234	+12.0%
1900	220	−6.0%
1910	235	+6.8%
1921	227	−3.4%
1930	229	+0.9%
1950	180	−21.4%
1961	168	−6.7%
1970	132	−21.4%
1980	109	−17.4%
1991	100	−8.3%
2001	97	−3.0%
2011	96	−1.0%
2021	73	−24.0%
Source: Censuses
