= Elena Kazimirtchak-Polonskaïa =

Ukrainian astronomer

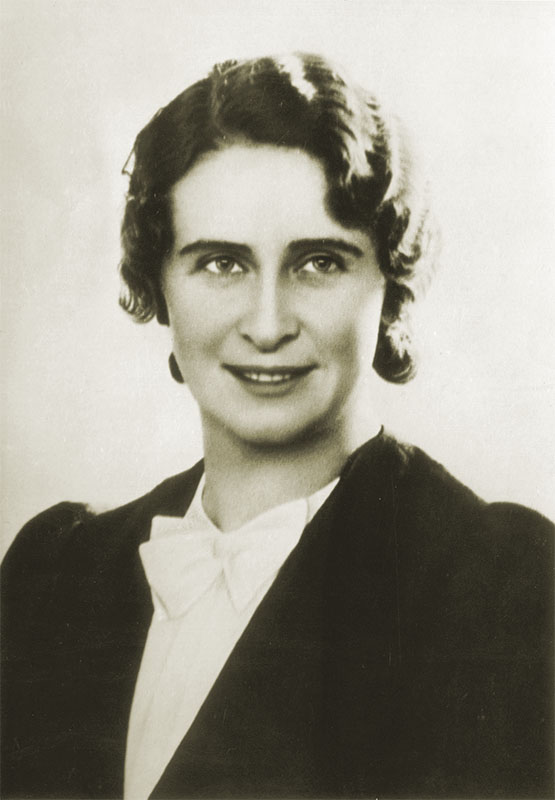
- Born: 21 November 1902; Sielec, Drohobych Raion
- Died: 30 August 1992 (aged 89); Saint Petersburg
- Resting place: Pulkovo Observatory cemetery, Saint Petersburg
- Education: Doctor of Sciences in Physics and Mathematics; Doctor of Philosophy
- Alma mater: Lviv University
- Awards: F. Bredikhin Award
- Scientific career
- Institutions: University of Warsaw; Institute of Theoretical Astronomy of the Russian Academy of Sciences

Olena Ivanivna Kazymyrchak-Polonska (21 November 1902 – 30 August 1992) was a Ukrainian astronomer and member of the International Astronomical Union, who studied the motion of comets and their orbital evolution. Asteroid 2006 Polonskaya was named in her honor.

== Life ==
In 1928, she graduated from University of Lviv. In 1923, she participated in the first meeting of the Russian Student Christian Movement in Czechia. From 1926 to 1928 she was an active member of this movement and its leader for Poland and Belarus. She acted as editor of the religious political journal At the Borderline. She participated in apologetic summer courses in Paris founded by Archpriest Sergei Bulgakov, her spiritual father. From 1932 to 1934, she was an assistant at the Astronomical Observatory of the University of Warsaw.

In 1936, she married Leon Kazimierczak, an ichthyologist at Warsaw University, and in May 1937, their son Sergei (named after Sergei Bulgakov) was born. During World War II, she worked as senior scientist at the Department of Astronomy in Lviv and moved to Warsaw in 1944. During the Warsaw Uprising in 1944, she became separated from her husband who was brought to a camp near Vienna as war prisoner. In 1945, she made a very bold and crucial decision for her later life: As an Orthodox, she decided to return to Russia, although the Soviet Union was totalitarian at that time. She first lived in Kherson (in today's Ukraine) where her son died of meningitis in July 1948.

From 1945, she taught mathematics and astronomy at the Kherson State University. In 1948, she became a researcher, then a senior researcher at the Institute of Theoretical Astronomy of the Academy of Sciences of the Soviet Union. In November 1951, she was dismissed from work. In 1952, due to her religious belief and missionary activities, she was arrested on suspicion of "espionage", and held from January to August, by the USSR State Security Committee. She was acquitted and released.

From 1953 to 1956 she was an associate professor at the Department of Higher Mathematics of the K. D. Ushynsky South Ukrainian National Pedagogical University. In 1964 she became a member of the International Astronomical Union. From 1967 to 1985, she helped organize All-Union and international astronomical seminars and symposia. From 1976 to 1978, she was the head of the scientific group on the dynamics of small bodies at the Astronomical Council of the Academy of Sciences of the Soviet Union. Polonskaïa studied in-depth the Leonids, a prolific meteor shower.

In 1970, Elena became an active member Polish–Soviet Friendship Society and in 1972, an honorary member of the USSR Institute of Blind People; in particular, she participated in the publication of works in mathematics and programming in Braille script. In the years after 1970, she organized in her home two secret circles for working with young people and adults, reading the gospels and lecturing on apologetics, patristics, history of the Church and various other theological topics.

In the 1980s, she took religious vows and became a nun choosing the path of "monasticism in the world". She worked on the biblical studies and the history of the Russian Church, writing original works and translations. She was fluent in Polish, French and German. In her last years, she almost completely lost her eyesight but, having an excellent memory, she gave a series of lectures on the life and work of Archpriest Sergey Bulgakov. She died on 30 August 1992. She was buried in the cemetery of astronomers at the Pulkovo Observatory.

== Awards and honors ==
- In 1969, she won the F. A. Bredikhina prize for her research on short period comets and their orbital evolution.
- Asteroid 2006 Polonskaya, discovered by Nikolai Chernykh at the Crimean Astrophysical Observatory on 22 September 1973, was named after her. The official naming citation was published by the Minor Planet Center on 1 September 1978 (M.P.C. 4481).
