= Lety (Písek District) =

- Municipality
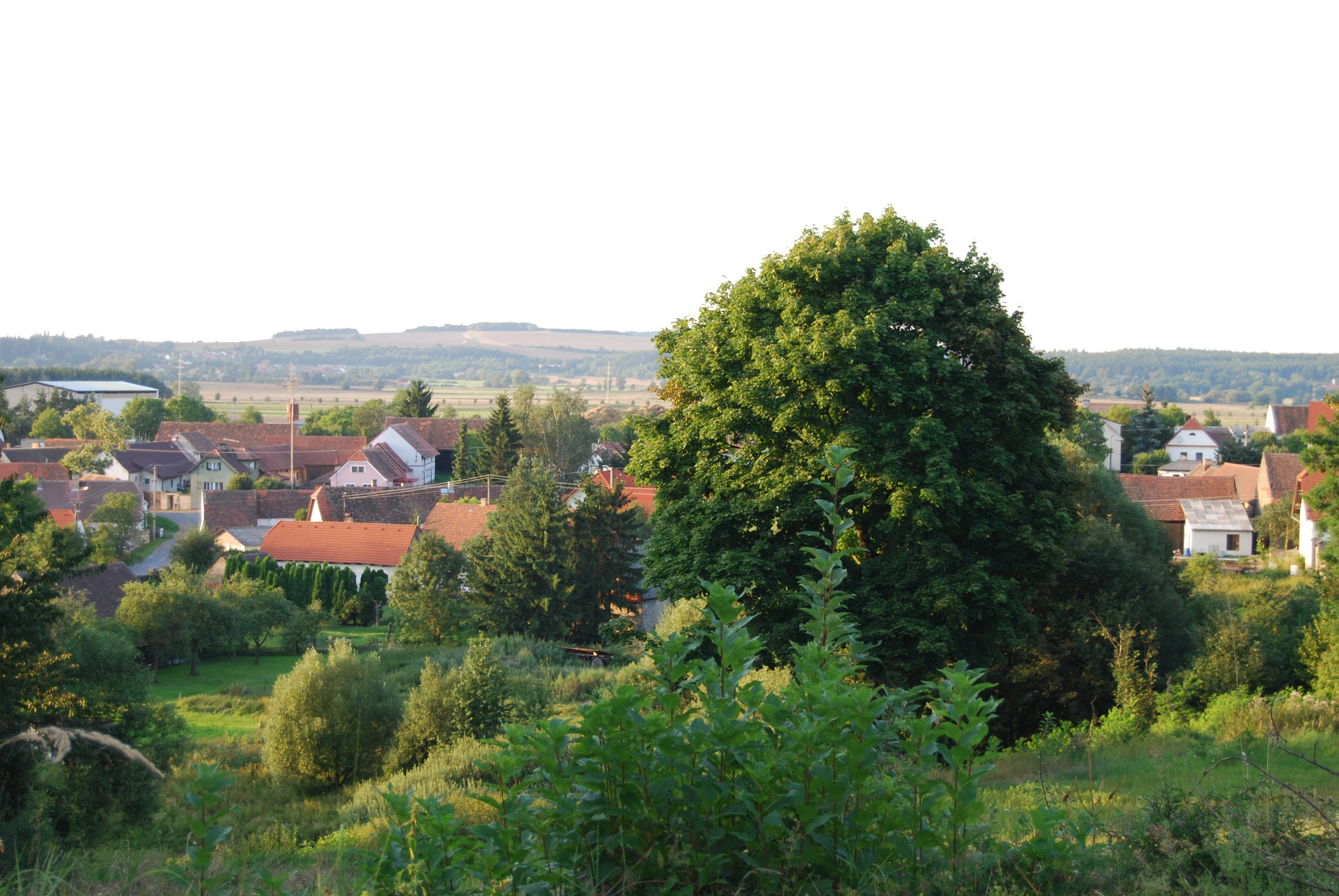
- View of a part of Lety

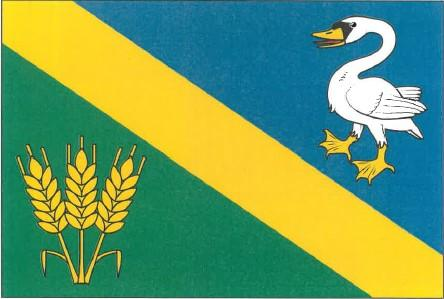
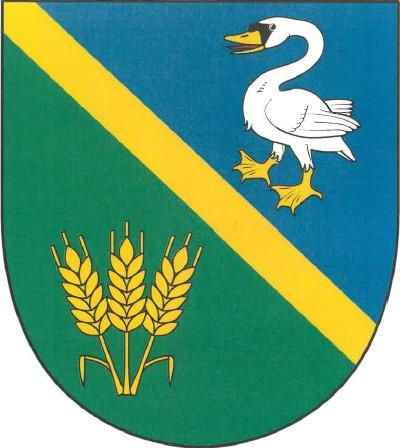
- Flag Coat of arms

- Location in the Czech Republic
- Coordinates: 49°31′1″N 14°5′16″E
- Country: Czech Republic
- Region: South Bohemian
- District: Písek
- First mentioned: 1312

Area
  - Total: 13.91 km^{2} (5.37 sq mi)
- Elevation: 450 m (1,480 ft)

Population (2026-01-01)
  - Total: 303
  - Density: 21.8/km^{2} (56.4/sq mi)
- Time zone: UTC+1 (CET)
  - Summer (DST): UTC+2 (CEST)
- Postal code: 398 07
- Website: www.lety-obec.cz

Lety is a municipality and village in Písek District in the South Bohemian Region of the Czech Republic. It has about 300 inhabitants.

== Administrative division ==
Lety consists of three municipal parts (in brackets population according to the 2021 census):

- Lety (224)
- Pukňov (5)
- Šerkov (54)

== Etymology ==
The name Lety is derived from the personal name Léto, meaning "the village of Létos (Léto's family)".

== Geography ==
Lety is located about 24 kilometres (15 mi) north of Písek and 60 km (37 mi) south of Prague. It lies in the Benešov Uplands. The highest point is the hill Holý vrch at 541 metres (1,775 ft) above sea level.

== History ==
The first written mention of Lety is from 1312. The village suffered during the Thirty Years' War. After 1700, economic and social conditions improved and the village's population increased significantly.

During World War II, the Lety concentration camp was established in the municipality. Romani and Sinti were the largest groups interned in the camp.

== Demographics ==
Historical population

Year	Pop.	±%
1869	837	—
1880	869	+3.8%
1890	824	−5.2%
1900	786	−4.6%
1910	780	−0.8%

Year	Pop.	±%
1921	759	−2.7%
1930	701	−7.6%
1950	519	−26.0%
1961	453	−12.7%
1970	374	−17.4%

Year	Pop.	±%
1980	320	−14.4%
1991	297	−7.2%
2001	282	−5.1%
2011	262	−7.1%
2021	283	+8.0%

Source: Censuses

== Transport ==
Lety is located at the crossroads of two main roads: the D4 motorway from Prague to Písek and the I/19 (the section from Plzeň to Tábor).

== Sights ==
In the municipality is a cemetery with a memorial to the genocide of the Czech and Moravian Romani and Sinti people. It was created in 1995. An educational trail leads from the village to the memorial.
