= Zigeunerlager =

Nazi concentration camps for Romani and Sinti people

The Zigeunerlager (English: Gypsy camps) were internment and forced labour camps established under Nazism by the German government for Romani and Sinti people. From 1935, so-called Gypsies in Germany were forced into municipal camps, which developed into forced labour camps. As Nazi Germany territoriality expanded, so did the extent of the camps. These camps were a prelude to the Romani Holocaust, and their internees were later transferred to concentration and extermination camps such as the Gypsy family camp in Auschwitz.

== Background ==
The 1926 "Law for the Fight Against Gypsies, Vagrants and the Workshy" was enforced in Bavaria, and became the national norm by 1929. It stipulated that groups identifying as 'Gypsies' avoid all travel to the region. Those already living in the area were to "be kept under control so that there [was] no longer anything to fear from them with regard to safety in the land." They were forbidden from "roam[ing] about or camp[ing] in bands", and those "unable to prove regular employment" risked being sent to forced labour for up to two years. Herbet Heuss notes that "[t]his Bavarian law became the model for other German states and even for neighbouring countries."

Under Adolf Hitler, a supplementary decree to the Nuremberg Laws was issued on 26 November 1935, classifying the Romani people (or Roma) as "enemies of the race-based state", thereby placing them in the same category as the Jews. Thus, the fate of the Sinti and Roma in Europe paralleled that of the Jews in the Holocaust.

== Development ==
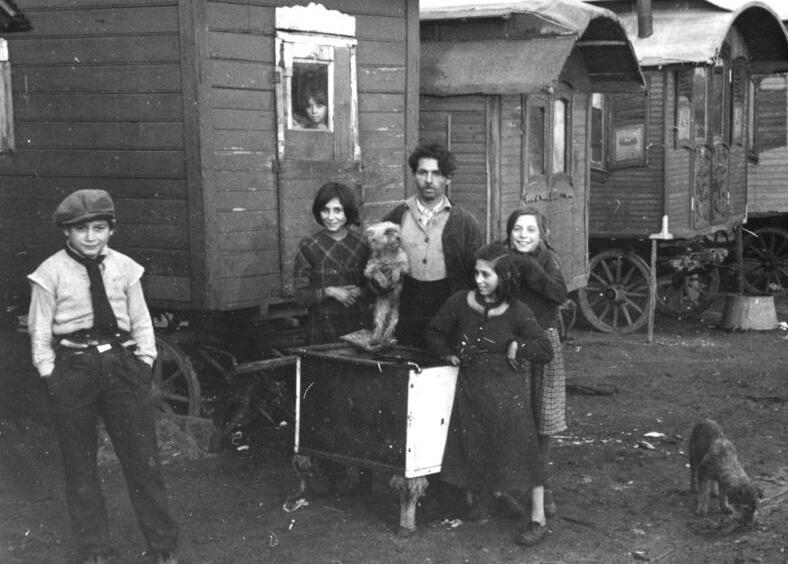
Residents of the Schwarz-Weiß-Platz (Cologne Gypsy Camp)

The Cologne Gypsy Camp (Schwarz-Weiß-Platz) was opened in May 1935, and acted as a model camp for other Zigeunerlager. It had spaces for Sinti and Roma families to bring their own caravans or to live in barracks. Those who received welfare payments were forced to live in the camp if they wished to keep them, but those who occupied private apartments were initially allowed to remain in the city. The site had limited facilities and was surrounded by a 2m high barbed wire fence, with an SS guard and local police monitoring it. By March 1937, up to 500 people, roughly half the local Romani population, lived in the camp.

The Berlin-Marzahn concentration camp started as a municipal Gypsy camp. It was established prior to the opening of the 1936 Berlin Olympics. On 16 July 1936, approximately 600 Gypsies were rounded up in the city and escorted to the suburb of Marzahn, to a site owned by the city which had previously been used to dispose of sewage. Those who did not live in caravans were housed in overcrowded barracks. By September 1938, the residents of the camp numbered 852. Lacking basic sanitation and electricity, disease was rampant, including diphtheria and tuberculosis, and in March 1939 it was measured that 40% of the inmates had scabies.

== Expansion ==
Other Zigeunerlager were adapted from established camps and throughout Nazi occupied territories. The Lety Gypsy Camp was an internment camp for Roma and Sinti people in Bohemia that was formerly a disciplinary labour camp. In August 1942, following the "Decree on Combating the Gypsy Plague" enacted in the Protectorate of Bohemia and Moravia on 10 July 1942, the vast majority of prisoners were emptied from the labour camp and the camp was designated as Zigeunerlager 1. The new internees were also forced to undertake labour within and without the camp; only those under the age of three were not assigned work tasks. Conditions were poor, with approximately 327 people of the 1,300 camp population dying from disease and malnutrition. The camp was guarded by former Czech gendarmes. By August 1943, the survivors of the camp were transported to Auschwitz "where almost all were murdered".

The Montreuil-Bellay camp was the largest Zigeunerlager in collaborative France, having been established on 8 November 1941. It was managed by the Vichy regime, but was established at the behest of the Nazis. Vichy France was the only place in Western Europe under the yoke of Nazi Germany where Heinrich Himmler's "Auschwitz Erlass" (Auschwitz decree) of 16 December 1942, which ordered the deportation of all "gypsies" to Auschwitz. Therefore, the internees remained at the camp, apart from those moved elsewhere to undertake forced labour. The French gypsy camps continued to operate until May 1946, two years after the liberation of France.

== Commemoration ==
In 1997, President Jacques Chirac made reference to Roma victims in relation to Nazi persecution and deportations; this was the first time a French head of state had publicly acknowledged their suffering during the Holocaust. Then, in 2016, President François Hollande attended a ceremony at the site of the Montreuil-Bellay camp where he unveiled the first memorial of its kind in France.
