= Lety (Prague-West District) =

- Municipality
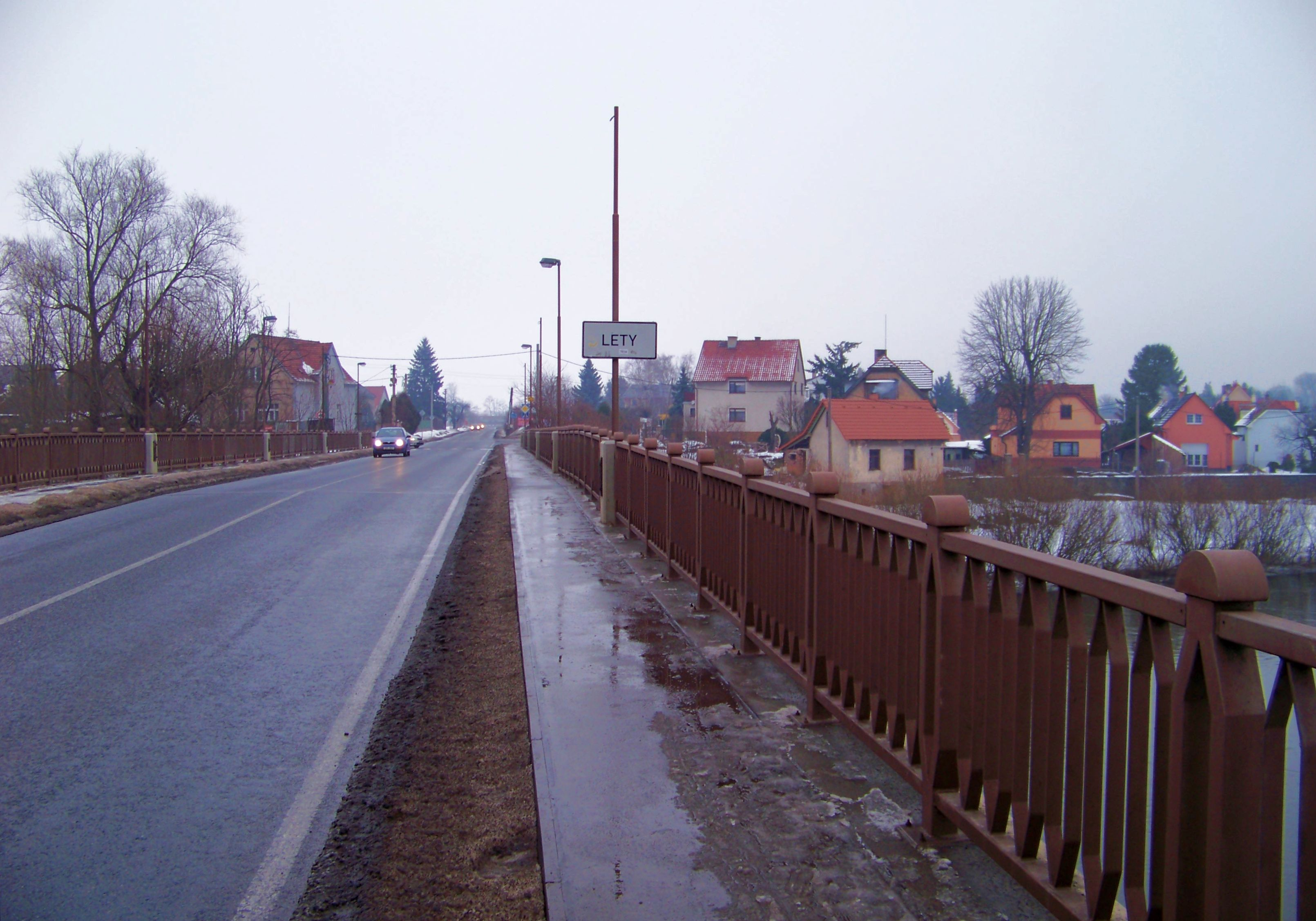
- Entrance to Lety

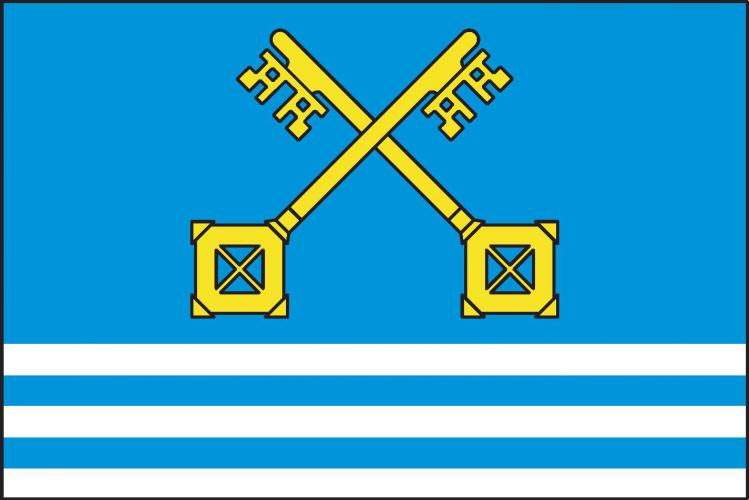
- Flag Coat of arms

- Location in the Czech Republic
- Coordinates: 49°55′16″N 14°15′19″E
- Country: Czech Republic
- Region: Central Bohemian
- District: Prague-West
- First mentioned: 1088

Area
  - Total: 3.24 km^{2} (1.25 sq mi)
- Elevation: 207 m (679 ft)

Population (2026-01-01)
  - Total: 1,697
  - Density: 524/km^{2} (1,360/sq mi)
- Time zone: UTC+1 (CET)
  - Summer (DST): UTC+2 (CEST)
- Postal codes: 252 29, 252 30
- Website: www.obec-lety.cz

Lety is a municipality and village in Prague-West District in the Central Bohemian Region of the Czech Republic. It has about 1,700 inhabitants.

== Etymology ==
The name is derived from the personal name Léto, meaning "the village of Létos (Léto's family)".

== Demographics ==
Historical population
| Year | Pop. | ±% |
|---|---|---|
| 1869 | 290 | — |
| 1880 | 287 | −1.0% |
| 1890 | 299 | +4.2% |
| 1900 | 270 | −9.7% |
| 1910 | 306 | +13.3% |
| 1921 | 347 | +13.4% |
| 1930 | 465 | +34.0% |
| 1950 | 598 | +28.6% |
| 1961 | 684 | +14.4% |
| 1970 | 625 | −8.6% |
| 1980 | 647 | +3.5% |
| 1991 | 643 | −0.6% |
| 2001 | 777 | +20.8% |
| 2011 | 1,408 | +81.2% |
| 2021 | 1,630 | +15.8% |
Source: Censuses

== Twin towns – sister cities ==
Lety is twinned with:

- Ailertchen, Germany
