= Hodonín (Blansko District) =

- Municipality
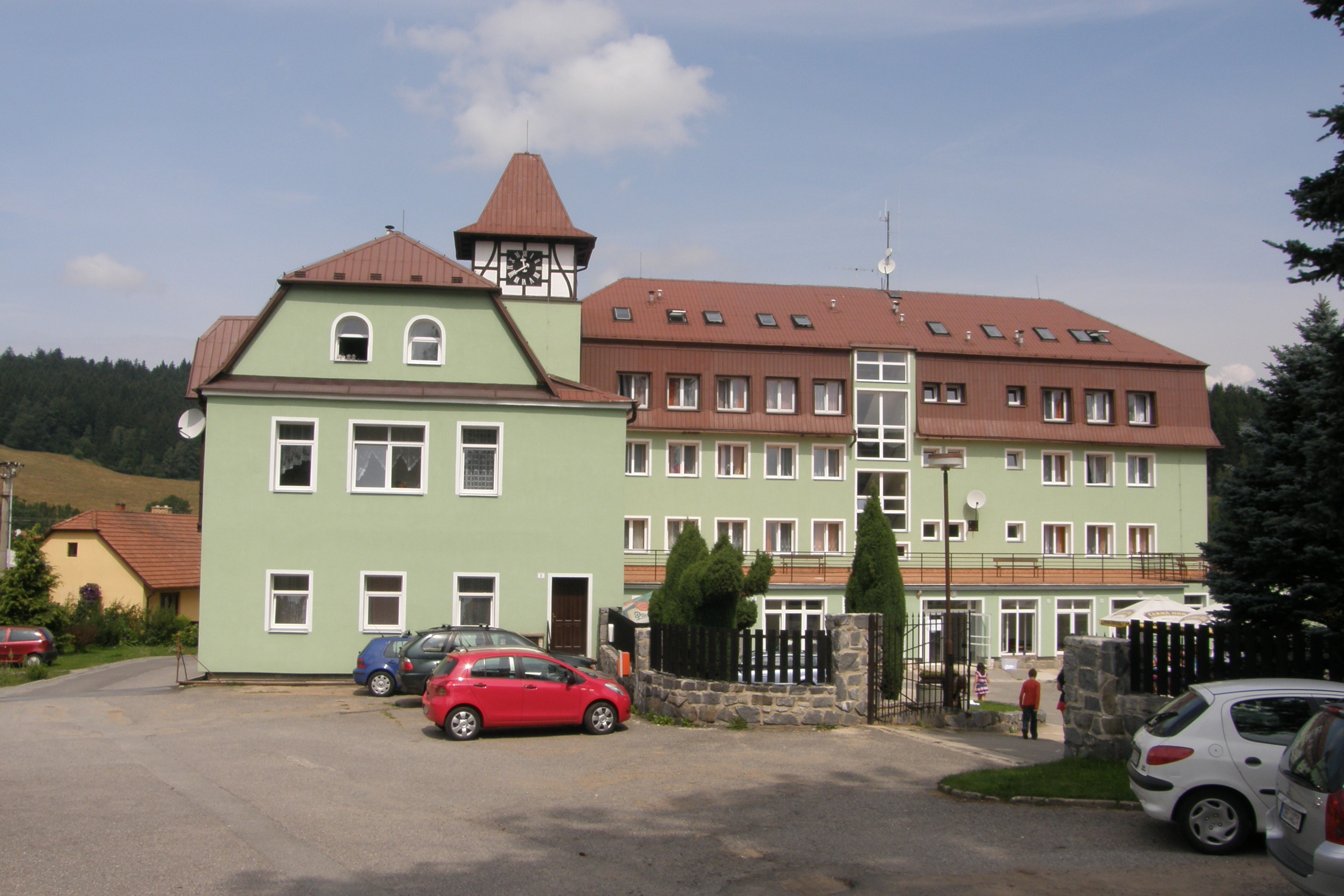
- Hodonín Castle

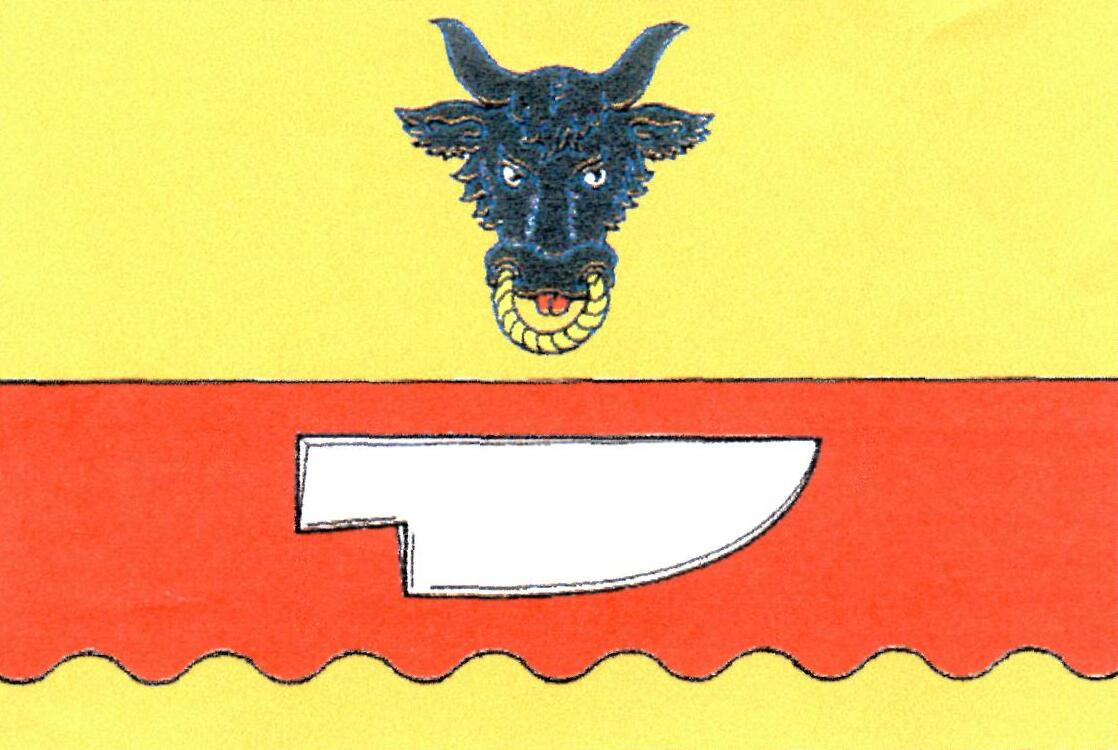
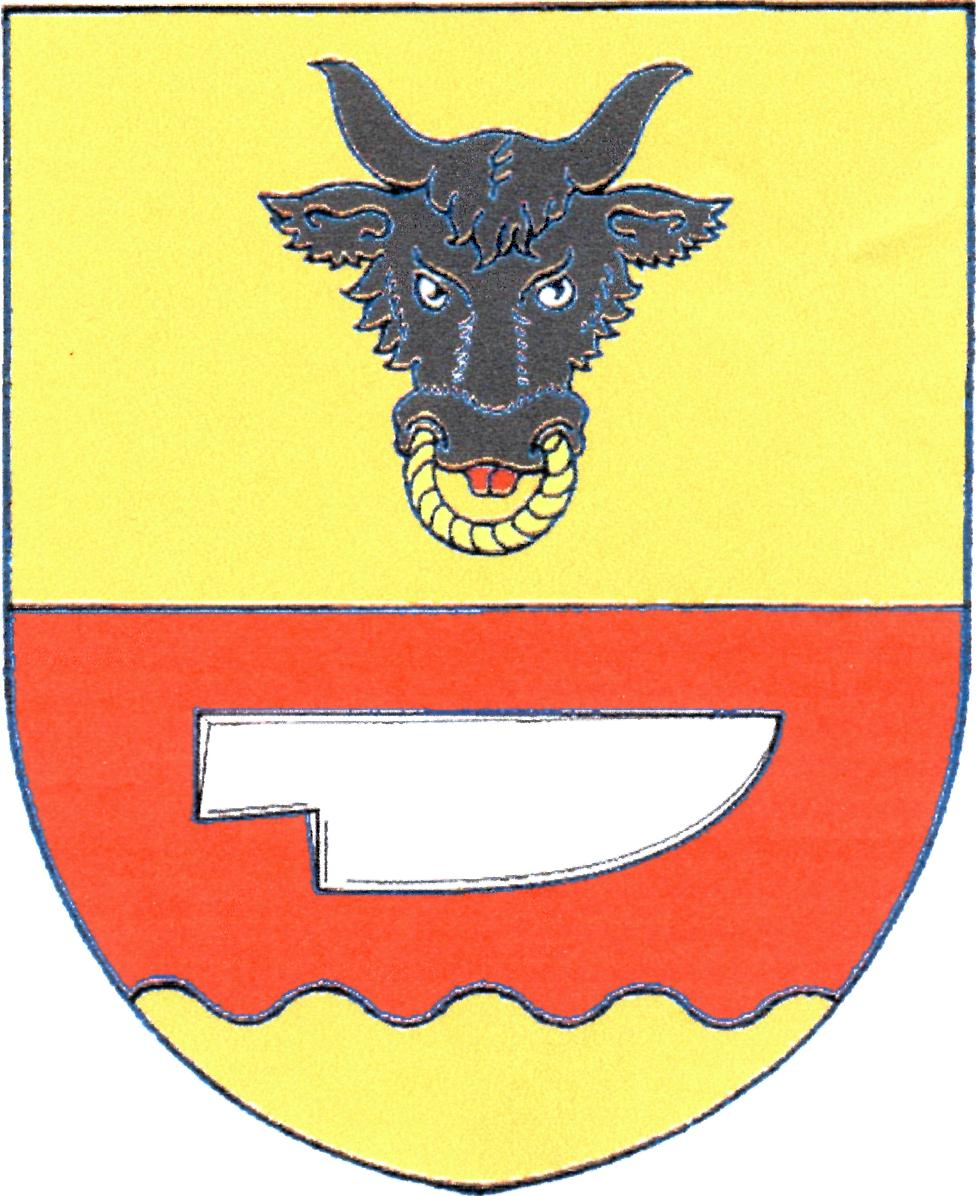
- Flag Coat of arms

- Location in the Czech Republic
- Coordinates: 49°30′4″N 16°24′37″E
- Country: Czech Republic
- Region: South Moravian
- District: Blansko
- First mentioned: 1360

Area
  - Total: 3.17 km^{2} (1.22 sq mi)
- Elevation: 496 m (1,627 ft)

Population (2026-01-01)
  - Total: 197
  - Density: 62.1/km^{2} (161/sq mi)
- Time zone: UTC+1 (CET)
  - Summer (DST): UTC+2 (CEST)
- Postal code: 679 71
- Website: www.hodoninukunstatu.cz

Hodonín (Czech pronunciation: [ˈɦodoɲiːn]) is a municipality and village in Blansko District in the South Moravian Region of the Czech Republic. It has about 200 inhabitants.

== History ==
The first written mention of Hodonín is from 1360. The most important owners of the village were the Pernštejn family that granted the village some privileges.

During World War II, Romani people were imprisoned at the Hodonín concentration camp, before being transported to the Auschwitz extermination camp. Around 1,300 prisoners passed through the camp, of which 194 died.

== Demographics ==
Historical population
Year	Pop.	±%
1869	345	—
1880	289	−16.2%
1890	318	+10.0%
1900	335	+5.3%
1910	311	−7.2%
1921	272	−12.5%
1930	267	−1.8%
1950	206	−22.8%
1961	208	+1.0%
1970	244	+17.3%
1980	195	−20.1%
1991	153	−21.5%
2001	156	+2.0%
2011	140	−10.3%
2021	118	−15.7%
Source: Censuses
