= Elena Gorolová =

Czech human rights defender

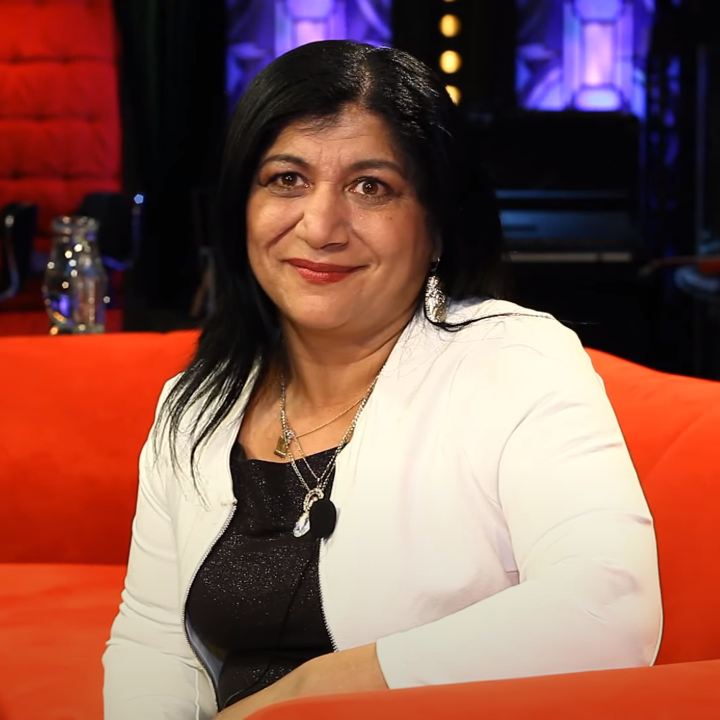
- Gorolová in 2019
- Born: 2 January 1969 (age 57); Ostrava, Czechoslovakia
- Occupations: Human rights activist; Social worker
- Known for: Romani and women's rights activism
- Movement: Group of Women Harmed by Forced Sterilization

Elena Gorolová (born 2 January 1969) is a Czech Romani human rights defender and women's reproductive rights activist. After being forcefully sterilized at the age of 21, Gorolová began campaigning for Romani women's rights to bodily autonomy and for compensation for victims of forced sterilization. She testified in front of the United Nations and was declared one of the BBC's 100 inspiring and influential women. After a Czech law promising to compensate the victims of forced sterilization was passed, she announced that she would refocus on campaigning against discrimination in maternity wards.

== Biography ==
Gorolová was born on 2 January 1969 in Ostrava to Eva, a cleaner, and Emil, a driver. Her family was originally from Slovakia, but they moved to the Czech Republic for work. After elementary school, she was trained in metalworking at a vocational secondary school and later worked at Vítkovice Steel. She said that all the Romani children at her school were automatically sent to vocational schools, without being informed of the possibility of higher education.

At the age of 21, she was forcibly sterilized in a hospital after giving birth to her second son. She had hoped to have another child and had not given her informed consent to the procedure. A nurse gave her a paper to sign while she was being prepared to undergo a caesarean section and she was delirious from pain. Her amniotic sac was artificially ruptured by surgeons and her fallopian tubes were severed. She said that her husband initially blamed her for the sterilization, thinking that she had done it on purpose because he did not believe that she was coerced, but he eventually decided to believe her. She explained that it is shameful among the Roma to be sterilized because they value large families. According to Gorolová, many other Romani women were abandoned by their husbands after being forcefully sterilized, because "[their husbands] wanted more children and were ashamed of their wives".

== Career ==
Gorolová has campaigned against forced sterilization and discrimination against Roma women in the Czech Republic, and advocated for redress and awareness of forced sterilizations. In 2005, Gorolová was one of the 87 Czech women complaining of being forcibly sterilized. In Czechoslovakia, from 1971 to 1983, Romani and disabled women were systemically subjected to the medical method against their will. According to Gorolová, doctors frequently lied to them, saying that they could still have more children even after being sterilized. Social workers also told women that they were signing a consent form for a "temporary contraceptive" with the promise of the ability to still become pregnant, while also offering money for food or a washing machine if they signed it. They also sometimes warned about possibly dying of pregnancy complications to persuade them to accept the procedure. Hospitals frequently made women sign the consent forms while in labour or recovering from C-sections. Some of them were illiterate.

In 2006, Gorolová testified before the 36th session of the United Nations Committee on the Elimination of All Forms of Discrimination against Women on the topic of women's rights in the Czech Republic. Gorolová and other activists have been allowed to meet the staff of local hospitals, where they "confronted" the doctors that had been involved in the forced actions. She is the spokesperson for the Group of Women Harmed by Forced Sterilization and a member of the Czech organization Vzájemné soužití (Life Together). Vzájemné soužití's goal is to reunite children living in state-run group homes with their biological families. According to Gorolová, the group works with both Romani and non-Romani children and families.

In 2009, the Czech government apologised for the sterilizations, but did not offer to compensate the victims. By April 2013, sterilization done without the patient's uncoerced informed consent had become illegal in the Czech Republic, and hospitals practising it may incur criminal and civil penalties including compensation for the victim. In 2021, Act no. 297/2021, Coll., which allowed financial compensation for victims of forced sterilizations, was approved by the Czech Parliament and was signed into law. Gorolová declared that "[n]o amount of money will bring us back the chance to have more children, but the compensation is important for justice". According to Gorolová, the bill requires documentation from the hospital that the sterilization took place, which failed to take into account that hospitals in the Czech Republic usually shred such documentation after ten years, preventing many women from claiming the compensation owed to them.

After Act no. 297/2021, Coll. was passed, Gorolová said that her next goal was to advocate against discrimination in maternity wards. In November 2018, she was recognized as one of 100 inspiring and influential women from around the world of the year published by the BBC. In 2021, she was given the annual Alice G. Masaryk Human Rights Award by the United States Embassy in the Czech Republic. In April 2025, Gorolová was given the František Kriegel prize by the Charter 77 Foundation. She received a Silver Medal from Miloš Vystrčil, president of the Czech Senate. She was nominated for the Order of Tomáš Garrigue Masaryk by the Chamber of Deputies in June 2026, and President Petr Pavel presented her with it in the fourth class on 28 October.

== Personal life ==
Gorolová works as a social worker in Ostrava. Her apartment was destroyed during the 2024 Central European floods. The Czech Government Commissioner for Roma Minority Affairs, Lucie Fuková, encouraged the public to donate to a fund organized by human rights activist Gwendolyn Albert, meant to assist Gorolová and her family in relocating to a new home.
