= 2006 Polonskaya =

Main-belt asteroid binary

Discovery
- Discovered by: N. Chernykh
- Discovery site: Crimean Astrophysical Obs.
- Discovery date: 22 September 1973

Designations
- Named after: Elena Polonskaïa (Russian astronomer)
- Alternative designations: 1973 SB_{3} · 1941 SD; 1948 QH · 1966 VC
- Minor planet category: main-belt · Flora

Orbital characteristics
- Epoch 17 December 2020 (JD 2459200.5)
- Uncertainty parameter 0
- Observation arc: 70.93 yr (25,909 d)
- Aphelion: 2.7721 AU
- Perihelion: 1.8777 AU
- Semi-major axis: 2.3249 AU
- Eccentricity: 0.1923
- Orbital period (sidereal): 3.55 yr (1,295 d)
- Mean anomaly: 107.39°
- Mean motion: 0° 16^{m} 40.8^{s} / day
- Inclination: 4.9106°
- Longitude of ascending node: 0.8717°
- Argument of perihelion: 24.849°
- Known satellites: 1

Physical characteristics
- Mean diameter: 4.625±0.163 km 4.804 km
- Mean density: 1.6 g/cm^{3} (est.)
- Synodic rotation period: 3.1183 h
- Geometric albedo: 0.3498; 0.354±0.096
- Spectral type: S (family-based)
- Absolute magnitude (H): 13.08

Satellite
Discovery
- Discovered by: D. Pray, P. Pravec, P. Kušnirák, W. Cooney, J. Gross, and D. Terrell
- Discovery date: 1 November 2005
- Detection method: Light curve

Orbital characteristics
- Semi-major axis: 8.5 km
- Orbital period (sidereal): 0.7979±0.0008 d (19 hours, 9 ± 1 minutes)
- Angular distance: 13 mas (maximum)
- Satellite of: 2006 Polonskaya

Physical characteristics
- Mean diameter: 0.99 km
- Volume: 0.5 km^{3} (est.)
- Sidereal rotation period: 6.6571±0.0002 h
- Apparent magnitude: <3.3 fainter than primary
- Absolute magnitude (H): 18.1

2006 Polonskaya (provisional designation: 1973 SB_{3}) is a stony Flora asteroid and asynchronous binary system from the inner regions of the asteroid belt, approximately 5 kilometers (3.1 miles) in diameter. It was discovered on 22 September 1973, by Soviet astronomer Nikolai Chernykh at the Crimean Astrophysical Observatory in Nauchnij, on the Crimean peninsula, and later named after Ukrainian astronomer Elena Kazimirtchak-Polonskaïa. Its one-kilometer-sized satellite was discovered by an international collaboration of astronomers in November 2005.

== Classification and orbit ==
Polonskaya is a member of the Flora family, one of the largest collisional populations of stony asteroids, when applying the synthetic hierarchical clustering method (HCM) by Nesvorný. However, according to another HCM-analysis by Milani and Knežević (AstDys), it is a background asteroid as in this analysis the Flora asteroid clan is not recognized. Polonskaya orbits the Sun in the inner main-belt at a distance of 1.9–2.8 AU once every 3 years and 7 months (1,295 days; semi-major axis of 2.32 AU). Its orbit has an eccentricity of 0.19 and an inclination of 5° with respect to the ecliptic. On 16 September 1941, it was first observed at the Finnish Turku Observatory in Finland. The body's observation arc begins in April 1950 at Palomar Mountain, about 23 years prior to its official discovery observation.

== Naming ==
This minor planet was named after Russian astronomer Elena Ivanovna Kazimirchak-Polonskaya (1902–1992), who researched the motion and orbital evolution of comets, in particular the capture of comets by major planets. She was a member of IAU's Commission XX, and was awarded the F. A. Bredikhin prize. The official naming citation was published by the Minor Planet Center on 1 September 1978 (M.P.C. 4481).

== Satellite ==
In 2005, it was claimed that lightcurve observations indicate that Polonskaya has a small moon about 0.99 km in diameter. However, the non-synchronously rotating binary still needs to be fully resolved in order to confirm such satellite. Alternatively, the presence of another body has also been suggested to explain the lightcurve's irregular period, which would make it a triple asteroid.

== Physical characteristics ==
Polonskaya is considered a stony S-type asteroid with a typically high albedo due to its membership to the Flora family.

=== Lightcurves ===
Between 2005 and 2010, several rotational lightcurves of Polonskaya were obtained from photometric observations by Donald Pray, Petr Pravec, Peter Kušnirák, Walter Cooney, John Gross and Dirk Terrell. Lightcurve analysis gave a rotation period between 3.114 and 3.1183 hours with a brightness amplitude of 0.18–0.10 magnitude for the best rated results (U=3/3/3/3). A later retracted alternative period solution of 6.69±0.01 h (about twice as long) has also been proposed. In September 2019, follow-up observations by Pravec gave an unchanged rotation period of 3.1181±0.0005 h (U=3).

=== Diameter and albedo ===
According to the survey carried out by NASA's Wide-field Infrared Survey Explorer with its subsequent NEOWISE mission, Polonskaya measures 4.625 kilometers in diameter and its surface has an albedo of 0.354. The Collaborative Asteroid Lightcurve Link adopts Petr Pravec's revised WISE-data, that is, an albedo of 0.3498 and a diameter of 4.80 kilometers based on an absolute magnitude of 13.35.
