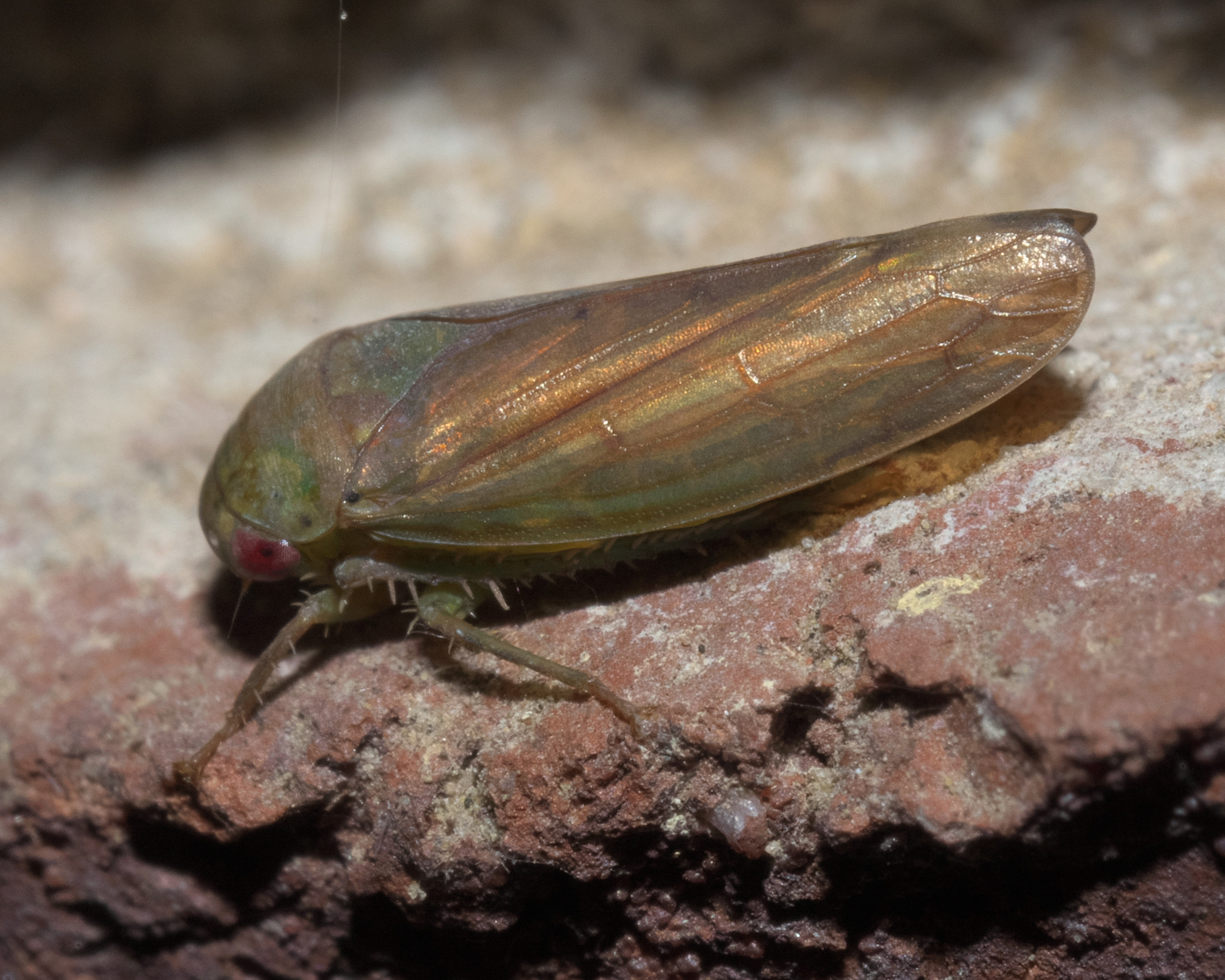

Scientific classification
- Domain: Eukaryota
- Kingdom: Animalia
- Phylum: Arthropoda
- Class: Insecta
- Order: Hemiptera
- Suborder: Auchenorrhyncha
- Family: Cicadellidae
- Tribe: Gyponini
- Genus: Polana; DeLong, 1942

= Polana (leafhopper) =

Genus of leafhoppers

Polana is a genus of leafhoppers in the family Cicadellidae. There are at least 140 described species in Polana.

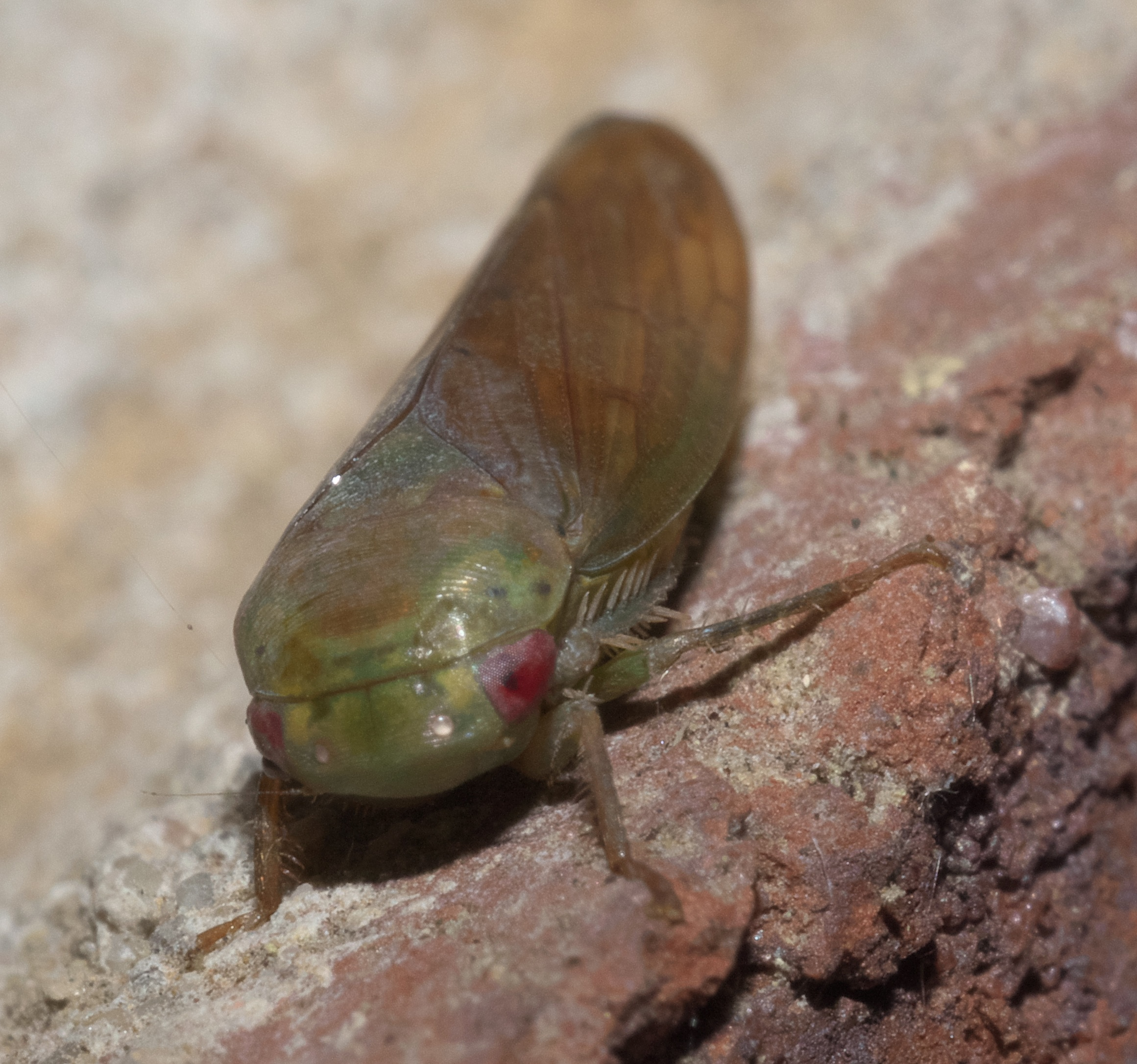
Polana

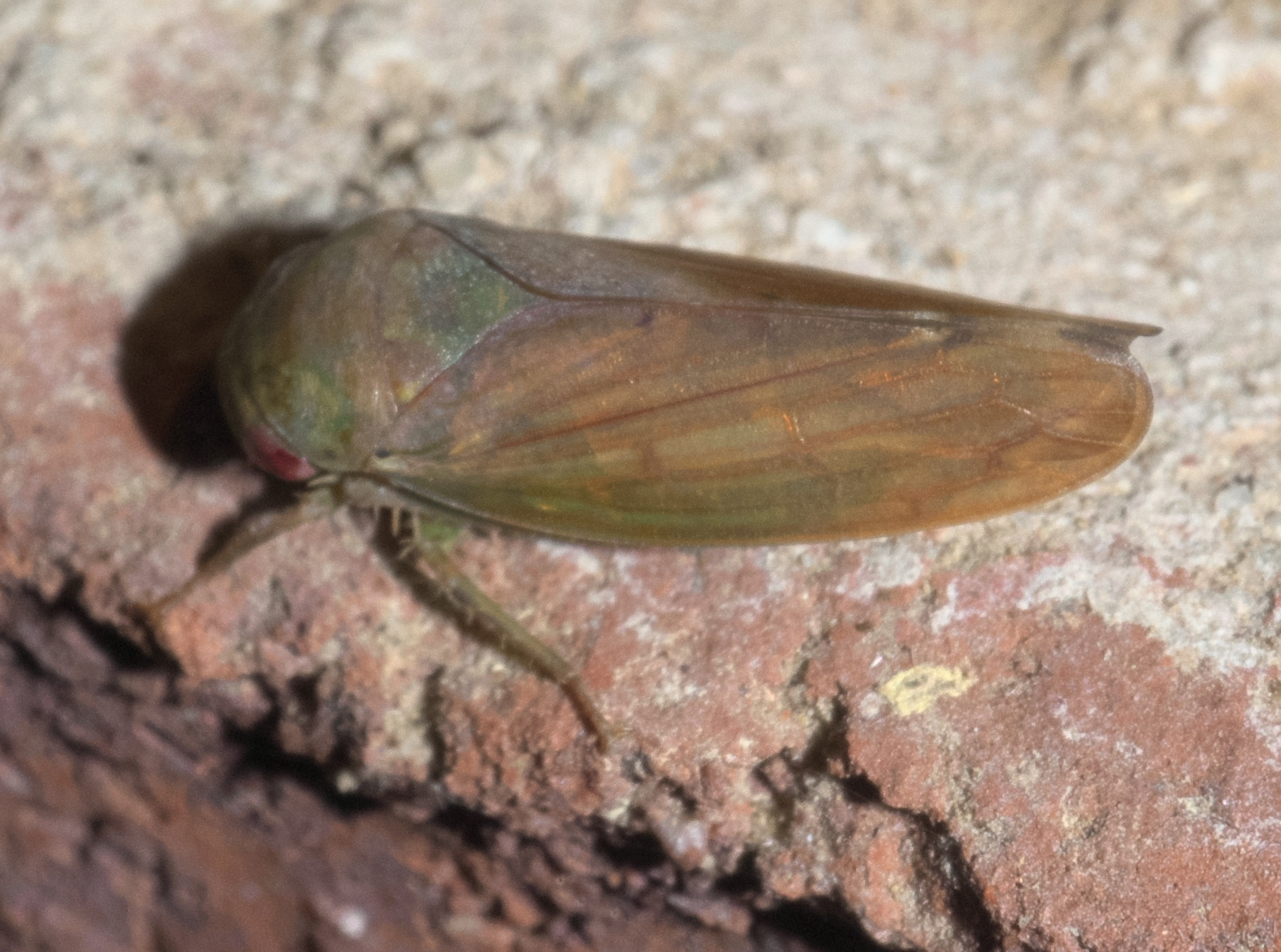
Polana

== See also ==
- List of Polana species
