= Poľany =

Poľany Pólyán
- Municipality
- Flag

- Location of Poľany in the Košice Region Location of Poľany in Slovakia
- Coordinates: 48.47°N 21.98°E
- Country: Slovakia
- Region: Košice Region
- District: Trebišov District
- First mentioned: 1214

Area
  - Total: 18.50 km^{2} (7.14 sq mi)
- Elevation: 100 m (330 ft)

Population (2025)
  - Total: 483
- Time zone: UTC+1 (CET)
  - Summer (DST): UTC+2 (CEST)
- Postal code: 768 4
- Area code: +421 56
- Vehicle registration plate (until 2022): TV
- Website: www.obecpolany.sk

Poľany (Hungarian: Pólyán) is a village and municipality in the Trebišov District in the Košice Region of south-eastern Slovakia.

== History ==
In historical records the village was first mentioned in 1214.

== Geography ==
The municipality lies at an altitude of 100 metres (330 ft) and covers an area of 18.50 km^{2} (7.14 sq mi) (2025).

== Population ==
Population statistic (10 years)
Year	1995	2005	2015	2025
Count	464	532	536	483
Difference		+14.65%	+0.75%	−9.88%

Population statistic
Year	2024	2025
Count	479	483
Difference		+0.83%

It has a population of 483 people (31 December 2025).

=== Ethnicity ===
Census 2021 (1+ %)
Ethnicity	Number	Fraction
Hungarian	396	78.26%
Slovak	118	23.32%
Romani	25	4.94%
Not found out	14	2.76%
Total	506	

In year 2021 was 506 people by ethnicity 396 as Hungarian, 118 as Slovak, 25 as Romani, 14 as Not found out, 2 as Other, 1 as Rusyn and 1 as English.

Note on population: The difference values of population numbers in the table "Population statistic" and in the sections "Ethnicity" & "Religion" is caused by the use of various statistical methods.

=== Religion ===
Census 2021 (1+ %)
Religion	Number	Fraction
Greek Catholic Church	272	53.75%
Roman Catholic Church	98	19.37%
Calvinist Church	82	16.21%
Not found out	23	4.55%
None	21	4.15%
Evangelical Church	8	1.58%
Total	506	

In year 2021 was 506 people by religion 272 from Greek Catholic Church, 98 from Roman Catholic Church, 82 from Calvinist Church, 23 from Not found out, 21 from None, 8 from Evangelical Church, 1 from Eastern Orthodox Church and 1 from Seventh-day Adventist Church.

== Facilities ==
The village has a public library and a football pitch.
