= Lety concentration camp =

Nazi concentration camp for Roma and Sinti

Coordinates: 49°30′30″N 14°07′07″E

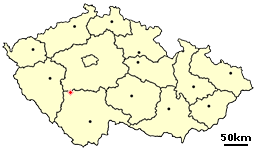
Location of Lety in the Czech Republic, south of Prague and north of České Budějovice

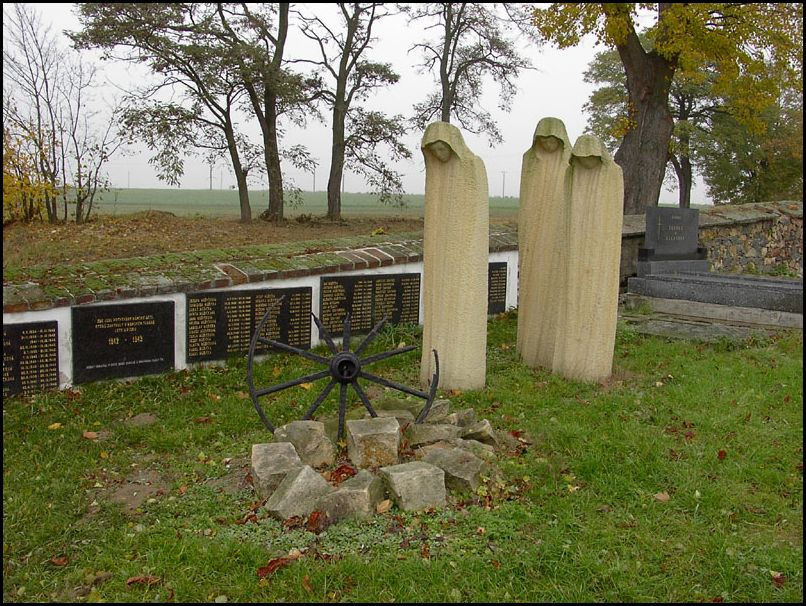
Memorial

Lety concentration camp was a World War II internment camp for Romani people from Bohemia and Moravia during the German occupation of Czechoslovakia. It was located in Lety.

== Background ==
On 2 March 1939 (two weeks before the German occupation), the Czecho-Slovak government ordered that a correctional facility in the form of labor camp be set up for "people avoiding work and living off crime" (at the time labor duty was mandatory).

The construction of a camp in the municipality of Lety (in South Bohemian Region) started on 17 July during the Nazi-German occupation. The location was picked because nearby forests, owned by the House of Schwarzenberg, had been devastated by a storm. The first twelve prisoners arrived on 17 July 1940. The camp consisted of several large and small wooden barracks surrounded by a wooden fence. Josef Janovský was named commandant. Czech gendarmes guarded the places (service in such camps was considered a disciplinary punishment). Similar forced labor camps existed in Planá, Mirošov, Hradištko and other places; (mostly Czech) prisoners were typically used for hard labour such as road construction. In total, around 50,000 people went through such labour camps during the war. The total number of prisons and camps of all kinds established by Nazis within the boundaries of modern-day Czech Republic was 2,125.

== As a labor camp ==
During 1940, 233 persons were sent to Lety, of whom 197 had previous criminal records. During 1941, the numbers were: 537 persons, 498 with previous criminal records, and 45 persons labeled as Gypsies. Overall there were more than 100 escape attempts with almost half of them successful. Most notable escape was done by Josef Serinek who managed to reach the Bohemian-Moravian Uplands, where he joined the partisan resistance fighters. The prisoners were forced to do hard work in a quarry, were treated harshly and the sick lacked medicine. Many guards, including commander Janovský, regularly stole food from the camp stores, further reducing meager rations for the prisoners.

== Situation of Romani people during German occupation ==
Starting in 1940, Romanis were forbidden to travel. In 1942, the measures already in force in Germany were applied in the Protectorate as well and, as an immediate result, a few hundred people deemed "asocial" were deported to Auschwitz. On 24 June 1942, the Protectorate Minister of the Interior, Richard Bienert, ordered the collection of statistics about "Gypsies, mixed Gypsies and people with gypsy style of life". Around 6,500 people were recorded in these statistics (based on older records and often on skin color).

On July 10, SS-Oberführer Horst Böhme, Chief of German Security Police, ordered Romanis to be moved into two camps: Lety for Romanis from Bohemia, Hodonín for those from Moravia.

== As a "Gypsy" camp ==
In 1942, the existing prisoner population at Lety was transferred or released, and the camp became a Zigeunerlager (Gypsy camp). 19 Romani were already imprisoned at Lety, and were retained as prisoners. On 2 October 1942, the first new internees arrived. The capacity of the camp was soon exhausted. Even though new buildings were constructed, the site continued to be overcrowded. Some internees were able to secure their release by bribing officials in Prague.

Internees worked on logging trees, road building and on neighbouring farms. The food was meagre and the rations decreased over time. During winter, internees were not provided sufficient clothing. Brutality on behalf of the guards was common. A typhoid epidemic started in December 1942 and did not recede until the camp was closed in May 1943. Commander Janovský was recalled for inability to deal with the epidemic and replaced by Commander Blahynka. In January 1943, a Czech Jewish doctor, Michal Marzell Bohin, was forced to move into the camp and attend to the internees; as a Jew, he was required to live in segregated accommodation from both the prisoners and guards, but received better food than the Roma.

The first transport with 94 people to Auschwitz Gypsy family camp left on 4 December 1942, and a second followed with 417 people on 14 May 1943. Most of the remaining prisoners were sent to the Hodonín concentration camp.

=== Overall numbers ===
The records are generally considered incomplete and all figures can be considered minimums:

- Compilation of existing data gives a total of 1309 prisoners interned in the camp
- 326 deaths (estimate), including all c. 30 children born in the camp
- Over 500 deported to Auschwitz

== Postwar investigations ==
After the war, several trials of Lety camp personnel began. Commander Janovský was jailed and charged in 1945. The investigation was stopped in 1946 but restarted in 1948. Both guards and former prisoners gave testimony about his brutality and theft, but Janovský was acquitted.

Guard Josef Hejduk was accused of torture, and former prisoners accused him of several murders. He was acquitted in 1947; the witnesses were not deemed trustworthy due to their criminal records. Harsh treatment was explained by the "need to deal with dangerous criminals." Guard Josef Luňáček, also accused of torture, was found guilty of a minor offense and punished with an official warning.

The Chief of Police in the Protectorate, Friedrich Sowa, was sentenced to 10 years for crimes that included extermination of Romani. The decision was later overturned, since he was acting on Himmler's orders, and he was expelled from the country.

== Forgotten and rediscovered history ==
After the war, the existence of Romani Nazi camps was practically forgotten outside the Romani community, except by specialized historians. The whole community of Czech Romani was annihilated and the new ones, who came from Slovakia and Romania, had no knowledge of this tragedy. During the 1970s, a large factory pig farm was constructed near the site of the Lety camp. A tourist hotel has been built on the site of the Hodonín camp.

In the 1970s and 1980s, Czech historians, notably Ctibor Nečas, researched and described the persecution of Roma during the Nazi occupation, including the camps in Lety and Hodonín.

The late 1990s saw heated discussions in the Czech Republic about Czech relations to the Romani and their history, partly caused by two books published during that time. In 1998 the book Black Silence by Paul Polansky compiled historical records and testimonials of survivors. Meanwhile, 1997's And No One Will Believe You by Markus Pape caused one reviewer to note:

Previous studies of the Romani Holocaust in Czechoslovakia have, as Pape suggests, rejected survivors’ memories of extermination, executions, murders and rape carried out by the commandant and his guards, and have claimed that the camp did not function as an extermination camp. Such claims are joined to the assertion that survivors have, with the passing of time, confused what they saw with their own eyes in the camp. At the same time, previous studies have concluded that state documents exclude the possibility of such crimes having been committed. Pape succeeds, with this volume, in demonstrating that the state documents themselves not only support, but actually go further than, the eye-witness accounts; the idea that Lety really was an extermination camp is the first of the two main theses of the book... The second thesis of the book is that the camp at Lety operated with a certain independence from the Reich and erratic control from Prague.

== Political symbolism ==
The existence of the camps (or, more precisely, that they were guarded by protectorate policemen and the existence of the privately owned pig farm near Lety) quickly became a very powerful symbol in Czech politics. The issue started to attract minor political groups seeking to receive media attention.

Romani activists picked the pig farm as a symbol of the Czech stance toward the Romani, insisting it is a source of shame for the country internationally. They have repeatedly asked the government to relocate the farm. Their efforts gained further attention by a resolution of the European Parliament in 2005 asking the Czech Government to remove the farm. Opponents have criticized the massive cost of the farm's relocation, and insisted it has no impact on the actual life of the Romani people. They claim that the real intention of the activists is to extort money from the state and that the farm's removal would lead to a worsening of already tense relations between ethnic Czechs and Roma. In both 2005 and 2006, the Czech government announced its intention to buy and liquidate the farm, but later decided against it.

In 2005, an exhibition of historical photographs and documentation entitled "Lety Detention Camp: History of Unmentioned Genocide" was held in the European Parliament and toured cities in Europe.

More recently, organizations in the Czech Republic such as the Committee for the Redress of the Romani Holocaust, Dzeno Association, and Romea are working to keep the issue alive and defend the site from right-wing extremist political demonstrations.

In 2017, the Czech government finally decided to buy the pig farm from company AGPI for 450 million Czech crowns (around 17.5 million EUR). The government will also pay 100 million Czech crowns for demolition of the farm. In the area it will build a heritage site managed by the Museum of Romani Culture. As 2020, the demolition was postponed because of the coronavirus pandemic. In early 2021, a winner of the architectonic competition was announced.

Demolition of the farm began on 22 July 2022.

== Lety Stone ==
A commemorative stone, with a plaque, was erected by the small far right party the National Party at the site of the former Lety concentration camp to reflect its opinion that it was a labour camp. The stone and plaque were immediately removed by the local authorities.

== See also ==
- Hodonin concentration camp
- Porajmos
