= Paul Polansky =

American author and Romani rights activist (1942–2021)

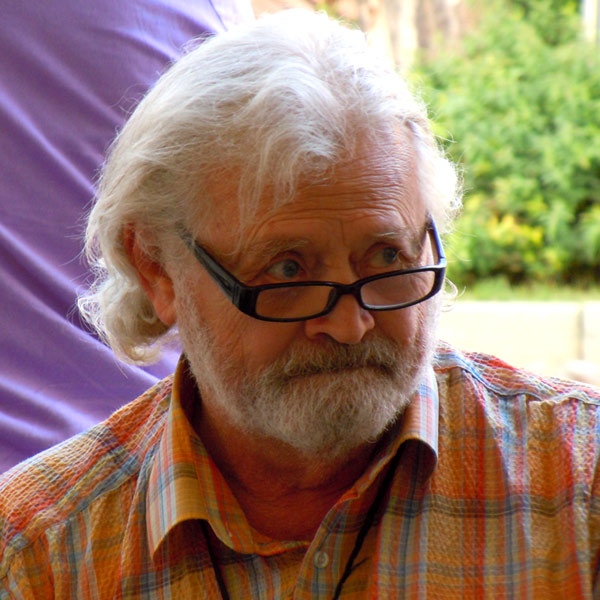
Paul Polansky, 2011

Paul Polansky (February 17, 1942 – March 26, 2021) was an American writer and Romani activist.

Paul Polansky held a degree in journalism, history and rhetoric from Marquette University. In the early 1990s, he founded the Czech Historical Research Center in the United States and participated in several American and European scientific conferences on human rights in Eastern Europe.

In the 1990s, he discovered 40,000 documents in the Czech archives on the Gypsy extermination camp in Lety, run by the Czechs during World War II. After making this discovery, he moved to the Czech Republic to continue his research. He also began organizing conferences devoted to them at the United States Holocaust Memorial Museum.

In 1999, Polansky began working for the United Nations High Commissioner for Refugees to serve as an advisor for Roma (Gypsy) refugees in Kosovo. He headed the Kosovo Roma Refugee Foundation (KRRF), an NGO working for the suffering residents of the Romany camps in Mitrovica. From July 1999 to September 2009, he was the head of the mission of the Association for Endangered Nations in Kosovo and Serbia. On December 10, 2004, the Weimar City Council awarded Polansky with the Human Rights Award.

Polansky died in 2021 due to an illness.

== Publications ==
- Otaker Dvorak and Paul J. Polansky, Antonin Dvorak, My Father, Czech Historical Research Ctr, 1993, ISBN 978-0-9636734-0-4.
- Living Through It Twice: Poems Of The Romany Holocaust, G PLUS G, 1998, ISBN 978-80-86103-11-2.
- Black Silence: The Lety Survivors Speak, G PLUS G, 1998, ISBN 978-0-89304-241-7.
- Not a Refugee; The Plight of the Kosovo Roma (Gypsies) After the 1999 War, Voice of Roma, 2000.
- The River Killed My Brother, Norton Coker, 2001, ISBN 978-1-879457-75-1.
- The Blackbirds of Kosovo, Left Curve Publications, 2001.
- Bus Ride in Jerusalem, Roma Refugee Fund, 2003.
- To UNHCR, with Love, Divus, 2003, ISBN 978-80-86450-27-8.
- Kosovo Blood, KRRF, 2004.
- Sarah’s People: Nish Cemetery Poems & Photos, KRRF, 2005.
- UN-leaded Blood, published by KRRF (2005), ISBN 978-1-879457-95-9.
- Safari Angola, wyd. nakładem własnym, 2006.
- Gypsy Taxi, wyd. nakładem własnym, 2007.
- One blood, one flame: the oral histories of the Yugoslav gypsies before, during and after WWII, Kosovo Roma Refugee Foundation, 2008, ISBN 9781879457720
- Undefeated, Multimedia Edizioni, 2009.
- Deadly Neglect, wyd. nakładem własnym, 2010.
- Boxing Poems, Volo Press edizioni, 2010.
- Poesie, Damocle Edizioni, 2011.
- The Storm, CreateSpace Independent Publishing Platform, 2011, ISBN 978-1-4637-5540-9.
- Black Silence, CreateSpace Independent Publishing Platform, 2011, 978–1466295742.
- La mia vita con gli zingari, Datanews, 2011, ISBN 978-88-7981-325-9.
- Paul Polanksy, Roberto Malini, The silence of the violins – Il silenzio dei violini, Il Foglio Letterario, 2012.
- Paul Polanksy, Roberto Nassi, The hand of God – La mano di Dio, Il Foglio Letterario, 2012.
- Cry, Gypsy, poems of Germany’s Forced Deportations of Kosovo, Volo Press edizioni, 2012.
- 'The Search for Bong Way Wong and the Chinese Bullfighters' self-published, 2016.
