= Polány =

- Village
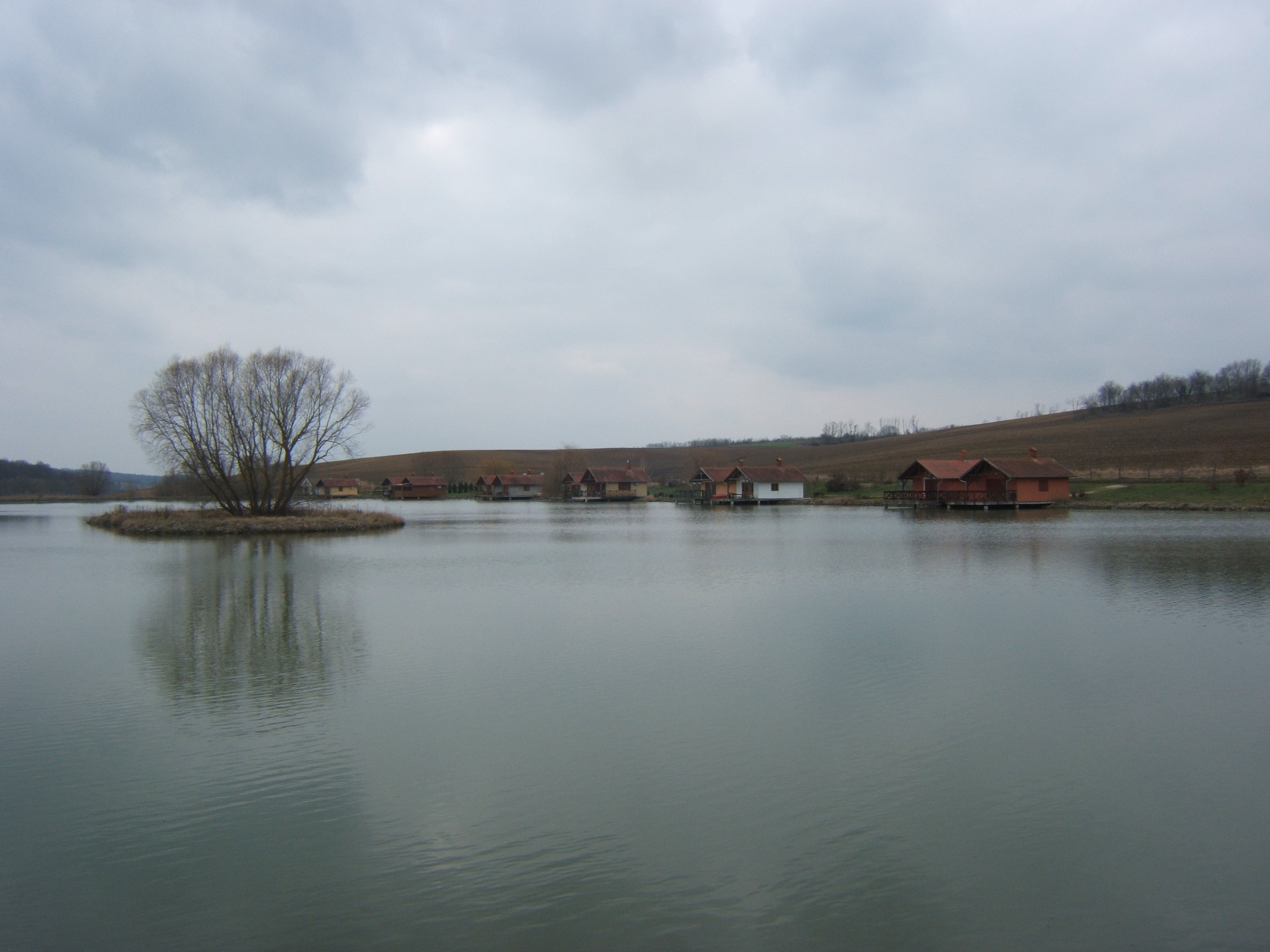
- Fish pond of Királyberk in Polány

- Location of Somogy county in Hungary

- Location of Polány
- Coordinates: 46.55859°N 17.77135°E
- Country: Hungary
- Region: Southern Transdanubia
- County: Somogy
- District: Kaposvár
- RC Diocese: Kaposvár

Area
  - Total: 12.87 km^{2} (4.97 sq mi)

Population (2017)
  - Total: 230
  - Density: 18/km^{2} (46/sq mi)
- Demonym: polányi
- Time zone: UTC+1 (CET)
  - Summer (DST): UTC+2 (CEST)
- Postal code: 7458
- Area code: (+36) 82
- NUTS 3 code: HU232
- MP: József Attila Móring (KDNP)

Polány (German: Polern) is a village in Somogy county, Hungary.
