= Spheres of exchange =

Spheres of exchange is a heuristic tool for analyzing trading restrictions within societies that are communally governed and where resources are communally available. Goods and services of specific types are relegated to distinct value categories, and moral sanctions are invoked to prevent exchange between spheres. It is a classic topic in economic anthropology.

Paul Bohannan developed the concept in relation to the Tiv of Nigeria, who he argued had three spheres of exchange. He argued that only certain kinds of goods could be exchanged in each sphere; each sphere had its own different form of money. The term is also used in reference to gift economies. Similarly, Clifford Geertz's model of "dual economy" in Indonesia and James C. Scott's model of "moral economy" hypothesized different exchange spheres emerging in societies newly integrated into the market; both hypothesized a continuing culturally ordered "traditional" exchange sphere resistant to the market. Geertz used the sphere to explain peasant complacency in the face of exploitation, and Scott to explain peasant rebellion. This idea was taken up lastly by Jonathan Parry and Maurice Bloch, who argued in "Money and the Morality of Exchange" (1989), that the "transactional order" through which long-term social reproduction of the family takes place has to be preserved as separate from short-term market relations.

The introduction of money into communal societies where these sphere-of-exchange restrictions exist can disrupt resource allocation, by creating a pathway for exchange that is not accounted for in the existing restrictions. However, in some societies money has been more or less successfully integrated into spheres of exchange.

== Tiv spheres of exchange ==
The concept of spheres of exchange was introduced by Paul Bohannan and Laura Bohannan in analyzing their field work with the Tiv in Nigeria. The Bohannan's discuss three types of ranked exchange objects, each restricted to its own separate exchange sphere; ideally, objects do not flow between spheres. The subsistence sphere included food such as yams, grains, vegetables, and small livestock, as well as eating utensils, farming tools and tools for food-preparation. The second sphere of wealth included brass rods, cattle, white cloth, and slaves. A third and most prestigious sphere was marriageable female relatives. "In calling these different areas of exchange spheres, we imply that each includes commodities that are not regarded as equivalent to those commodities in other spheres and hence in ordinary situations are not exchangeable. Each sphere is a different universe of objects. A different set of moral values and different behavior are to be found in each sphere." As a result, it is considered immoral to use prestige objects to purchase goods from a lower sphere.

Similar examples of exchange spheres have been noted by Frederik Barth among the Fur of Sudan; by Raymond Firth among the Tikopia in the south Pacific; by Bronisław Malinowski in the Trobriand Islands off New Guinea amongst others.

=== Why spheres of exchange? ===
A number of writers have emphasized that spheres of exchange are set up in order to protect subsistence goods from being monopolized by a few group members who have control of wealth objects. Bloch and Parry alternately phrase this for market based societies; where universal money has been introduced, moral injunctions are introduced to prevent its use within the family. The family, which is responsible for long term social reproduction of individuals and the group, has to be preserved from the short-term morality of market exchange.

Bohannan and Dalton argue that these societal restrictions exist in traditional egalitarian societies in order to inhibit the accumulation of wealth by a few individuals, to the detriment of the community. Trading restrictions that prevent the exchange of wealth objects in the hands of only a few for other kinds of goods ensures the availability of subsistence goods for all of the group's members. Sillitoe adds that the highly valued "wealth" items (such as the brass rods in the Tiv example) are not locally produced, hence politically ambitious leaders cannot step up their production of these goods thereby maintaining an egalitarian social order.

David Graeber provides a historical explanation for the development of Tiv exchange spheres which places less emphasis on the preservation of a communal subsistence sphere and more on the development of west African slavery by Dutch and Portuguese merchants. In the same vein, Jane Guyer argues that the refusal to convert items between spheres of exchange in the local area makes sense in terms of the regional economy of trade between ethnic groups. For example, the Tiv refused to convert brass rods for subsistence goods in the local area because they were saving up their supply for conversion upwards to rights in people with groups to the North. Viewed this way, the Tiv did not refuse to convert between spheres, but simply engaged in long term trade where the conversion would bring the most profit.

=== The effect of money on spheres of exchange ===
The Bohannans note that, within some spheres, particular kinds of objects (such as brass rods) may serve one of the classical functions of money, a standard of value for the objects within that sphere of exchange. The introduction of (colonially produced) general-purpose money resulted, they argued, in a universal standard of value across all exchange spheres that broke down the barriers between them. Most subsequent debate has focused on the impact of money on distinct spheres of exchange.

While money did serve to break down Tiv exchange spheres, other cases have been cited where money has been socialized; that is, where money's characteristic as a universal unit of exchange has been subverted and prevented from allowing exchanges across spheres.

== Related concepts ==
=== Moral economy ===
English historian E. P. Thompson wrote of the moral economy of the poor in the context of widespread food riots in the English countryside in the late eighteenth century. According to Thompson these riots were generally peaceable acts that demonstrated a common political culture rooted in feudal rights to “set the price” of essential goods in the market. These peasants held that a traditional “fair price” was more important to the community than a “free” market price and they punished large farmers who sold their surpluses at higher prices outside the village while there were still those in need within the village. A moral economy is thus an attempt to preserve an alternate exchange sphere of subsistence goods from market penetration. The notion of a non-capitalist cultural mentalité using the market for its own ends has been linked to subsistence agriculture and the need for subsistence insurance in hard times.

=== Dual economy ===
The "Dual Economy" model was developed by Dutch colonial economist J.H. Boeke, and extended and popularized by the anthropologist Clifford Geertz in "Agricultural Involution: The Process of Ecological Change in Indonesia." Boeke's “dual economy” thesis maintained that Dutch capitalism never penetrated the "native" economy of Indonesia (the Netherlands East Indies); the native economy was shaped and moulded by a pre-capitalist culture and thus remained embedded in “social” rather than “economic” needs. In an early debate with liberal economists (a debate later recapitulated by substantivist and formalist economic anthropologists in the 1960s), he argued for the creation of a new sub-discipline, colonial economics, which was not predicated upon universalizing models of economic man. However, Boeke's model served colonial interests by underscoring western economic rationality and placing Indonesians in a subordinated evolutionary position: the yet to be civilized. Geertz argued that colonialism “stabilized and accentuated the dual economy pattern of a capital-intensive Western sector and a labor-intensive Eastern one by rapidly developing the first and rigorously stereotyping the second.” Geertz's interpretation of Javanese peasant economic rationality as static, coddled within a closed corporate community and isolated from a capital-intensive colonial economy has increasingly been challenged. Critics argue that Geertz ignores the manner in which the "traditional" Javanese economy was incorporated in and exploited by the colonial capitalist regime.

=== Social, cultural and economic capital ===
Capital can either be economic wealth in the form of money or property, or something that is valued in social or cultural context. Capital can be used to influence other people.
