= Gift economy =

Mode of exchange where valuables are given without rewards

A gift economy or gift culture is a system of exchange where valuables are not sold, but rather given without an explicit agreement for immediate or future rewards. Social norms and customs govern giving a gift in a gift culture; although there is some expectation of reciprocity, gifts are not given in an explicit exchange of goods or services for money, or some other good or service. This contrasts with a market economy or bartering, where goods and services are primarily explicitly exchanged for value received.

The nature of gift economies is the subject of a foundational debate in anthropology. Anthropological research into gift economies began with Bronisław Malinowski's description of the Kula ring in the Trobriand Islands during World War I. The Kula trade appeared to be gift-like since Trobrianders would travel great distances over dangerous seas to give what were considered valuable objects without any guarantee of a return. Malinowski's debate with the French anthropologist Marcel Mauss quickly established the complexity of "gift exchange" and introduced a series of technical terms such as reciprocity, inalienable possessions, and presentation to distinguish between the different forms of exchange.

According to anthropologists Maurice Bloch and Jonathan Parry, it is the unsettled relationship between market and non-market exchange that attracts the most attention. Some authors argue that gift economies build community, while markets harm community relationships.

Gift exchange is distinguished from other forms of exchange by a number of principles, such as the form of property rights governing the articles exchanged; whether gifting forms a distinct "sphere of exchange" that can be characterized as an "economic system"; and the character of the social relationship that the gift exchange establishes. Gift ideology in highly commercialized societies differs from the "prestations" typical of non-market societies. Gift economies also differ from related phenomena, such as common property regimes and the exchange of non-commodified labour.

== Principles of gift exchange ==
According to anthropologist Jonathan Parry, discussion on the nature of gifts, and of a separate sphere of gift exchange that would constitute an economic system, has been plagued by the ethnocentric use of a modern, western, market society-based conception of the gift applied as if it were a universal across culture and time. However, he argues that anthropologists, through analysis of a variety of cultural and historical forms of exchange, have established that no universal practice exists. Similarly, the idea of a pure gift is "most likely to arise in highly differentiated societies with an advanced division of labour and a significant commercial sector" and needs to be distinguished from non-market "prestations". According to Weiner, to speak of a gift economy in a non-market society is to ignore the distinctive features of their exchange relationships, as the early classic debate between Bronislaw Malinowski and Marcel Mauss demonstrated. Gift exchange is frequently "embedded" in political, kin, or religious institutions, and therefore does not constitute an economic system per se.

=== Property and alienability ===
Gift-giving is a form of transfer of property rights over particular objects. The nature of those property rights varies from society to society, from culture to culture. They are not universal. The nature of gift-giving is thus altered by the type of property regime in place.

Property is not a thing, but a relationship amongst people about things. It is a social relationship that governs the conduct of people with respect to the use and disposition of things. Anthropologists analyze these relationships in terms of a variety of actors' (individual or corporate) bundle of rights over objects. An example is the current debates around intellectual property rights. Take a purchased book over which the author retains a copyright. Although the book is a commodity, bought and sold, it has not been completely alienated from its creator, who maintains a hold over it; the owner of the book is limited in what he can do with the book by the rights of the creator. Weiner has argued that the ability to give while retaining a right to the gift/commodity is a critical feature of the gifting cultures described by Malinowski and Mauss, and explains, for example, why some gifts such as Kula valuables return to their original owners after an incredible journey around the Trobriand islands. The gifts given in Kula exchange still remain, in some respects, the property of the giver.

In the example used above, copyright is one of those bundled rights that regulate the use and disposition of a book. Gift-giving in many societies is complicated because private property owned by an individual may be quite limited in scope (see § The commons below). Productive resources, such as land, may be held by members of a corporate group (such as a lineage), but only some members of that group may have use rights. When many people hold rights over the same objects, gifting has very different implications than the gifting of private property; only some of the rights in that object may be transferred, leaving that object still tied to its corporate owners. As such, these types of objects are inalienable possessions, simultaneously kept while given.

=== Gift versus prestation ===
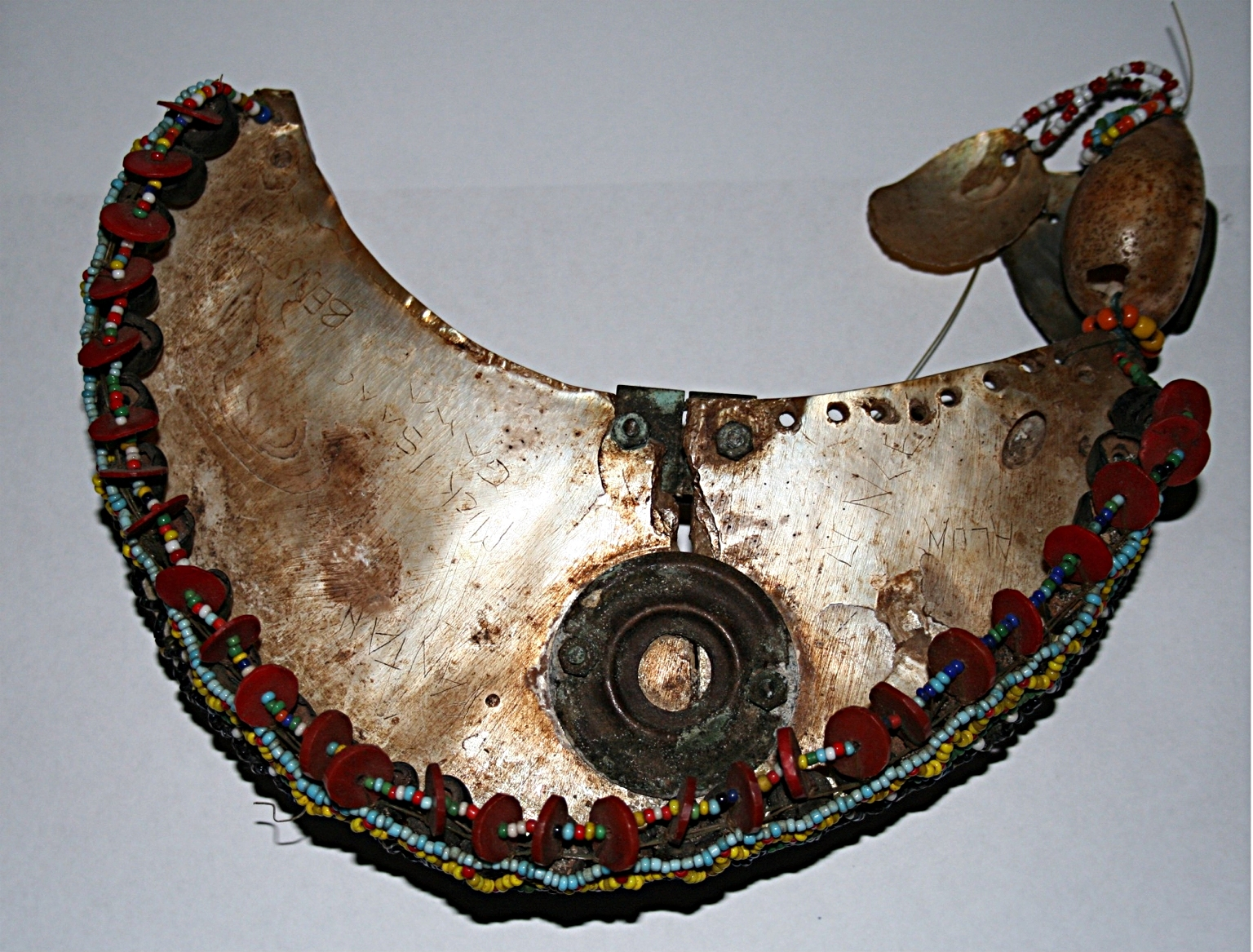
A Kula necklace, with its distinctive red shell-disc beads, from the Trobriand Islands

Malinowski's study of the Kula ring became the subject of debate with the French anthropologist, Marcel Mauss, author of "The Gift" ("Essai sur le don", 1925). Parry argued that Malinowski emphasized the exchange of goods between individuals, and their selfish motives for gifting: they expected a return of equal or greater value. Malinowski argued that reciprocity is an implicit part of gifting, that there is no gift free of expectation.

In contrast, Mauss emphasized that the gifts were not between individuals, but between representatives of larger collectives. These gifts were a total prestation, a service provided out of obligation, like community service. They were not alienable commodities to be bought and sold, but, like crown jewels, embodied the reputation, history and identity of a "corporate kin group", such as a line of kings. Given the stakes, Mauss asked "why anyone would give them away?" His answer was an enigmatic concept, the spirit of the gift. Parry believes that much of the confusion (and resulting debate) was due to a bad translation. Mauss appeared to be arguing that a return gift is given to maintain the relationship between givers; a failure to return a gift ends the relationship and the promise of any future gifts.

Both Malinowski and Mauss agreed that in non-market societies, where there was no clear institutionalized economic exchange system, gift/prestation exchange served economic, kinship, religious and political functions that could not be clearly distinguished from each other, and which mutually influenced the nature of the practice.

=== Inalienable possessions ===
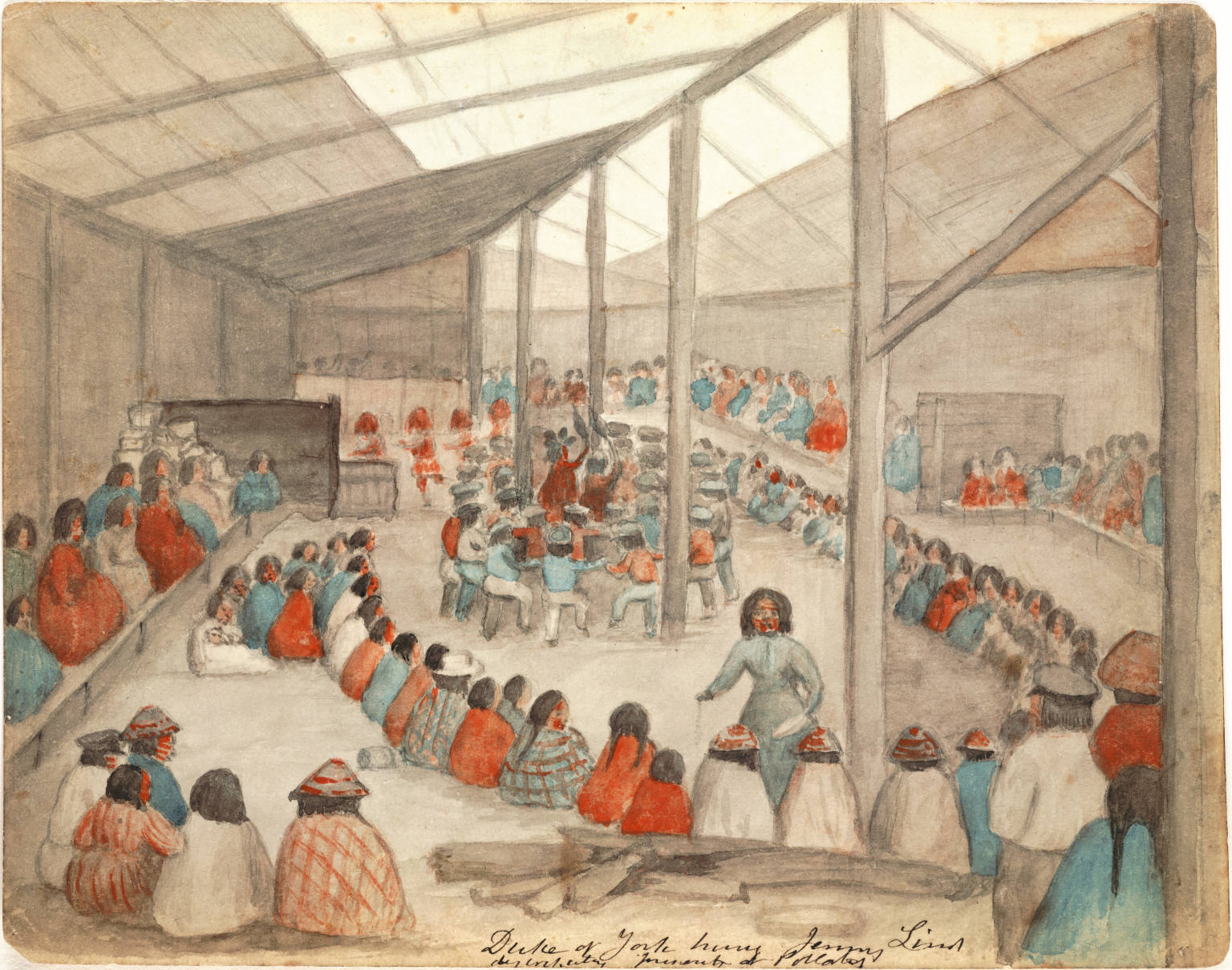
Watercolor by James G. Swan depicting the Klallam people of chief Chetzemoka at Port Townsend, with one of Chetzemoka's wives distributing potlatch

The concept of total prestations was further developed by Annette Weiner, who revisited Malinowski's fieldsite in the Trobriand Islands. Her critique was twofold. First, Trobriand Island society is matrilineal, and women hold much economic and political power, but their exchanges were ignored by Malinowski. Secondly, she developed Mauss' argument about reciprocity and the "spirit of the gift" in terms of "inalienable possessions: the paradox of keeping while giving". Weiner contrasted moveable goods, which can be exchanged, with immoveable goods that serve to draw the gifts back (in the Trobriand case, male Kula gifts with women's landed property). The goods given on the islands are so linked to particular groups that even when given away, they are not truly alienated. Such goods depend on the existence of particular kinds of kinship groups in society.

French anthropologist Maurice Godelier continued this analysis in The Enigma of the Gift (1999). Albert Schrauwers argued that the kinds of societies used as examples by Weiner and Godelier (including the Kula ring in the Trobriands, the Potlatch of the indigenous peoples of the Pacific Northwest Coast, and the Toraja of South Sulawesi, Indonesia) are all characterized by ranked aristocratic kin groups that fit Claude Lévi-Strauss' model of House Societies (where house refers to both noble lineage and their landed estate). Total prestations are given to preserve landed estates identified with particular kin groups and maintain their place in a ranked society.

=== Reciprocity and the spirit of the gift ===
Chris Gregory argued that reciprocity is a dyadic exchange relationship that we characterize, imprecisely, as gift-giving. Gregory argued that one gives gifts to friends and potential enemies in order to establish a relationship, by placing them in debt. He also claimed that in order for such a relationship to persist, there must be a time lag between the gift and counter-gift; one or the other partner must always be in debt. Marshall Sahlins gave birthday gifts as an example. They are separated in time so that one partner feels the obligation to make a return gift. To forget the return gift may be enough to end the relationship. Gregory stated that without a relationship of debt, there is no reciprocity, and that this is what distinguishes a gift economy from a true gift, given with no expectation of return (something Sahlins generalised reciprocity; see below).

Marshall Sahlins, an American cultural anthropologist, identified three main types of reciprocity in his book Stone Age Economics (1972). Gift or generalized reciprocity is the exchange of goods and services without keeping track of their exact value, but often with the expectation that their value will balance out over time. Balanced or Symmetrical reciprocity occurs when someone gives to someone else, expecting a fair and tangible return at a specified amount, time, and place. Market or negative reciprocity is the exchange of goods and services where each party intends to profit from the exchange, often at the expense of the other. Gift economies, or generalized reciprocity, occurred within closely knit kin groups, and the more distant the exchange partner, the more balanced or negative the exchange became.

=== Charity, debt, and the "poison of the gift" ===
Jonathan Parry argued that ideologies of the "pure gift" are most likely to arise only in highly differentiated societies with an advanced division of labour and a significant commercial sector" and need to be distinguished from the non-market "prestations" discussed above. Parry also underscored, using the example of charitable giving of alms in India (Dāna), that the "pure gift" of alms given with no expectation of return could be "poisonous". That is, the gift of alms embodying the sins of the giver, when given to ritually pure priests, saddled these priests with impurities of which they could not cleanse themselves. "Pure gifts", given without a return, can place recipients in debt, and hence in dependent status: the poison of the gift. David Graeber points out that no reciprocity is expected between unequals: if you make a gift of a dollar to a beggar, he will not give it back the next time you meet. More than likely, he will ask for more, to the detriment of his status. Many who are forced by circumstances to accept charity feel stigmatized. In the Moka exchange system of Papua New Guinea, where gift givers become political "big men", those who are in their debt and unable to repay with "interest" are referred to as "rubbish men".

The French writer Georges Bataille, in La part Maudite, uses Mauss's argument in order to construct a theory of economy: the structure of gift is the presupposition for all possible economy. Bataille is particularly interested in the potlatch as described by Mauss, and claims that its agonistic character obliges the receiver to confirm their own subjection. Thus gifting embodies the Hegelian dipole of master and slave within the act.

=== Spheres of exchange and "economic systems" ===
The relationship of new market exchange systems to indigenous non-market exchange remained a perplexing question for anthropologists. Paul Bohannan argued that the Tiv of Nigeria had three spheres of exchange, and that only certain kinds of goods could be exchanged in each sphere; each sphere had its own form of special-purpose money. However, the market and universal money allowed goods to be traded between spheres and thus damaged established social relationships. Jonathan Parry and Maurice Bloch argued in "Money and the Morality of Exchange" (1989), that the "transactional order" through which long-term social reproduction of the family occurs has to be preserved as separate from short-term market relations. It is the long-term social reproduction of the family that is sacralized by religious rituals such baptisms, weddings and funerals, and characterized by gifting.

In such situations where gift-giving and market exchange were intersecting for the first time, some anthropologists contrasted them as polar opposites. This opposition was classically expressed by Chris Gregory in his book "Gifts and Commodities" (1982). Gregory argued that:

Commodity exchange is an exchange of alienable objects between people who are in a state of reciprocal independence that establishes a quantitative relationship between the objects exchanged ... Gift exchange is an exchange of inalienable objects between people who are in a state of reciprocal dependence that establishes a qualitative relationship between the transactors (emphasis added).

Gregory contrasts gift and commodity exchange according to five criteria:

Commodity exchange	Gift exchange
immediate exchange	delayed exchange
alienable goods	inalienable goods
actors independent	actors dependent
quantitative relationship	qualitative relationship
between objects	between people

But other anthropologists refused to see these different "exchange spheres" as such polar opposites. Marilyn Strathern, writing on a similar area in Papua New Guinea, dismissed the utility of the contrasting setup in "The Gender of the Gift" (1988).

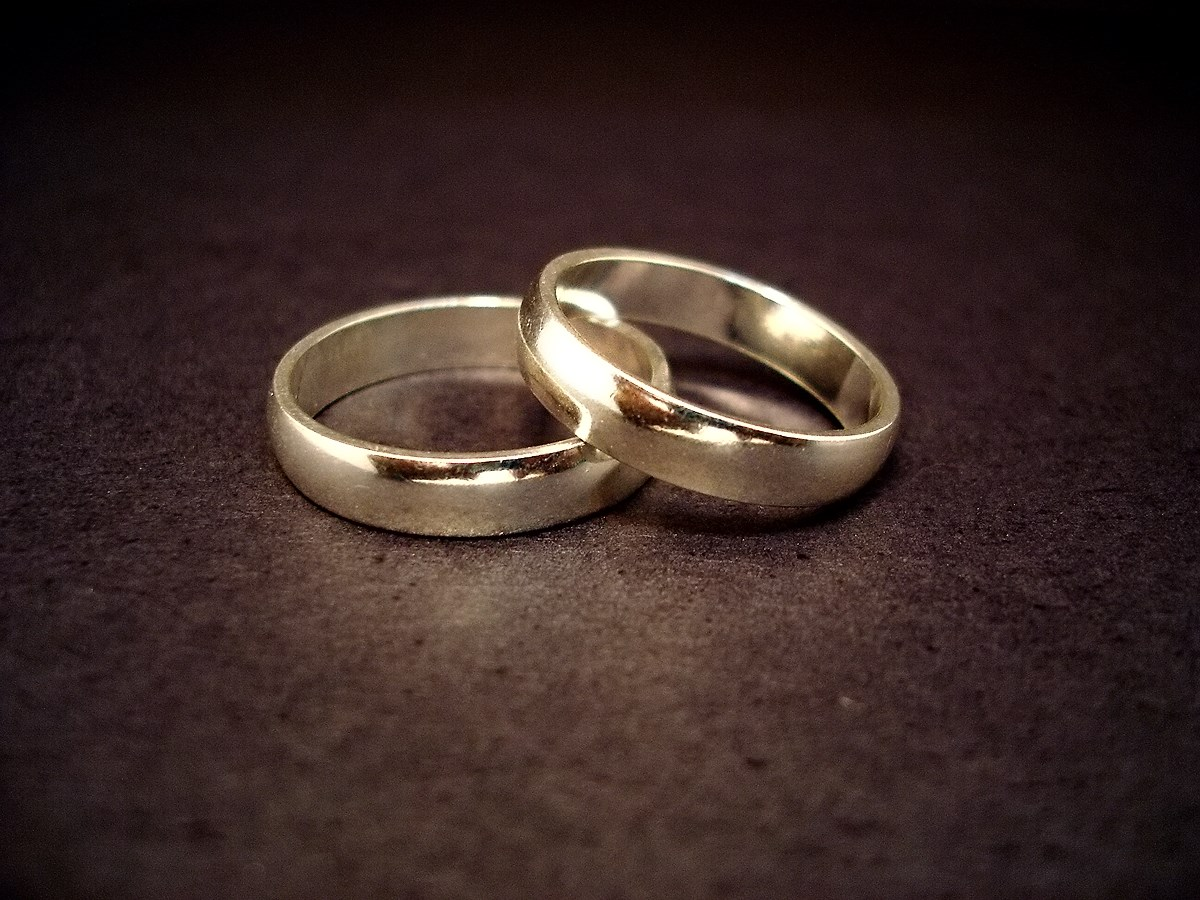
Wedding rings could be considered a commodity, purely a gift, or both.

Rather than emphasize how particular kinds of objects are either gifts or commodities to be traded in restricted spheres of exchange, Arjun Appadurai and others began to look at how objects flowed between these spheres of exchange (i.e. how objects can be converted into gifts and then back into commodities). They refocussed attention away from the character of the human relationships formed through exchange, and placed it on "the social life of things" instead. They examined the strategies by which an object could be "singularized" (made unique, special, one-of-a-kind) and so withdrawn from the market. A marriage ceremony that transforms a purchased ring into an irreplaceable family heirloom is one example; the heirloom, in turn, makes a perfect gift. Singularization is the reverse of the seemingly irresistible process of commodification. They thus show how all economies are a constant flow of material objects that enter and leave specific exchange spheres. A similar approach is taken by Nicholas Thomas, who examines the same range of cultures and the anthropologists who write on them, and redirects attention to the "entangled objects" and their roles as both gifts and commodities.

=== Proscriptions ===
Many societies have strong prohibitions against turning gifts into trade or capital goods. Anthropologist Wendy James writes that among the Uduk people of northeast Africa there is a strong custom that any gift that crosses subclan boundaries must be consumed rather than invested. For example, an animal given as a gift must be eaten, not bred. However, as in the example of the Trobriand armbands and necklaces, this "perishing" may not consist of consumption as such, but of the gift moving on. In other societies, it is a matter of giving some other gift, either directly in return or to another party. To keep the gift and not give another in exchange is reprehensible. "In folk tales," Lewis Hyde remarks, "the person who tries to hold onto a gift usually dies."

Daniel Everett, a linguist who studied the small Pirahã tribe of hunter-gatherers in Brazil, reported that, while they are aware of food preservation using drying, salting, and so forth, they reserve their use for items bartered outside the tribe. Within the group, when someone has a successful hunt they immediately share the abundance by inviting others to enjoy a feast. Asked about this practice, one hunter laughed and replied, "I store meat in the belly of my brother."

Carol Stack's All Our Kin describes both the positive and negative sides of a network of obligation and gratitude effectively constituting a gift economy. Her narrative of The Flats, a poor Chicago neighborhood, tells in passing the story of two sisters who each came into a small inheritance. One sister hoarded the inheritance and prospered materially for some time, but was alienated from the community. Her marriage broke up, and she integrated herself back into the community largely by giving gifts. The other sister fulfilled the community's expectations, but within six weeks had nothing material to show for the inheritance but a coat and a pair of shoes.

== Case studies: prestations ==
Marcel Mauss was careful to distinguish "gift economies" (reciprocity) in market societies from the "total prestations" given in non-market societies. A prestation is a service provided out of obligation, like "community service". These "prestations" bring together domains across political, religious, legal, moral and economic definitions, such that the exchange can be seen to be embedded in non-economic social institutions. These prestations are often competitive, as in the potlatch, Kula exchange, and Moka exchange.

=== Moka exchange in Papua New Guinea: competitive exchange ===
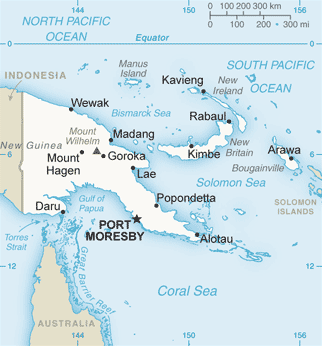
Mount Hagen, Papua New Guinea

The Moka is a highly ritualized system of exchange in the Mount Hagen area of Papua New Guinea, that has become emblematic of the anthropological concepts of a "gift economy" and of a "big man" political system. Moka are reciprocal gifts that raise the social status of the giver if the gift is larger than one that the giver received. Moka refers specifically to the increment in the size of the gift. The gifts are of a limited range of goods, primarily pigs and scarce pearl shells from the coast. To return the same value as one has received in a moka is simply to repay a debt, strict reciprocity. Moka is the extra. To some, this represents interest on an investment. However, one is not bound to provide moka, only to repay the debt. One adds moka to the gift to increase one's prestige, and to place the receiver in debt. It is this constant renewal of the debt relationship which keeps the relationship alive; a debt fully paid off ends further interaction. Giving more than one receives establishes a reputation as a Big man, whereas the simple repayment of debt, or failure to fully repay, pushes one's reputation towards the other end of the scale, "rubbish man". Gift exchange thus has a political effect; granting prestige or status to one, and a sense of debt in the other. A political system can be built out of these kinds of status relationships. Sahlins characterizes the difference between status and rank by highlighting that Big man is not a role; it is a status that is shared by many. The Big man is "not a prince of men", but a "prince among men". The "big man" system is based on the ability to persuade, rather than command.

=== Toraja funerals: the politics of meat distribution ===
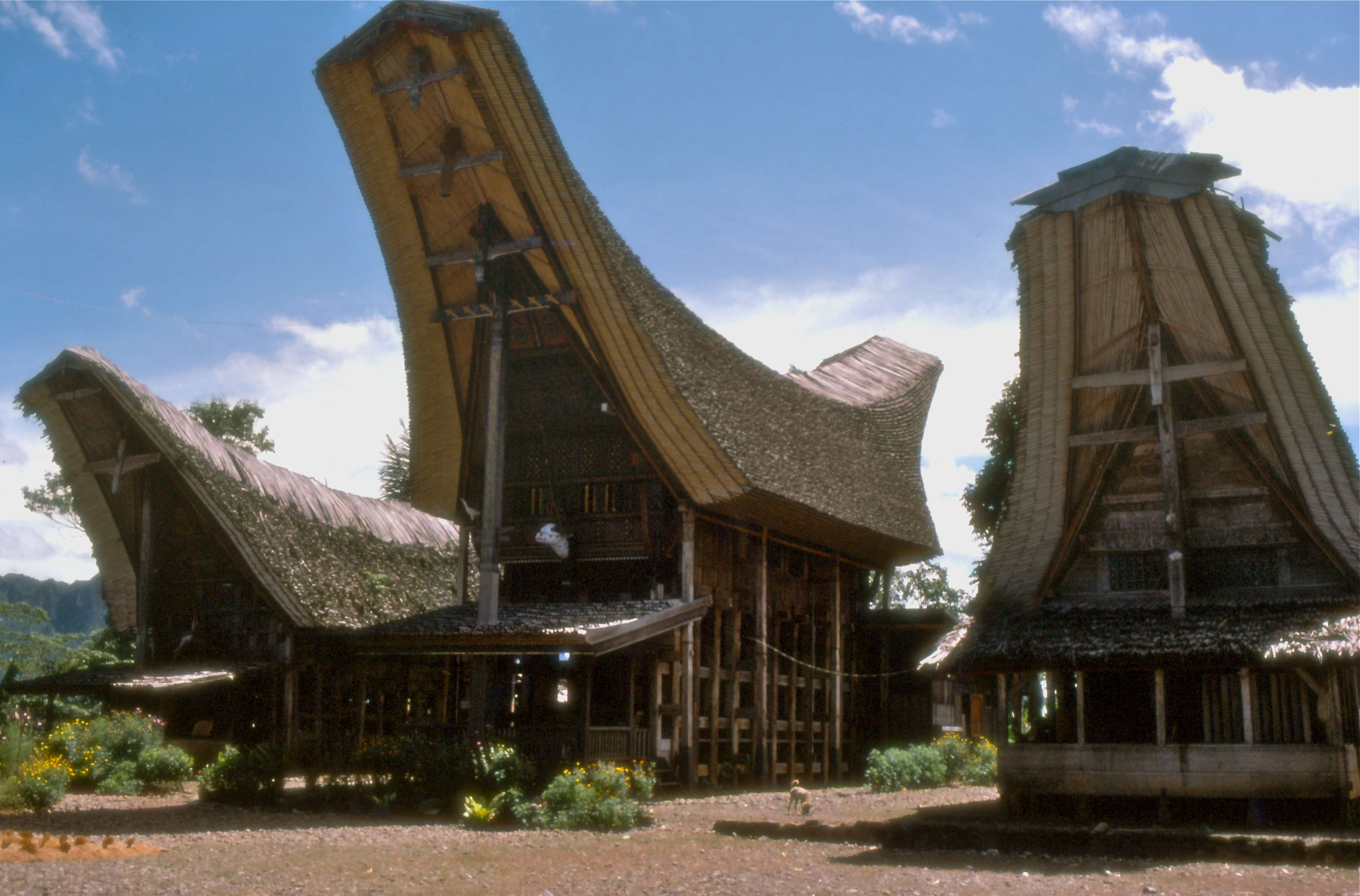
Three tongkonan noble houses in a Torajan village

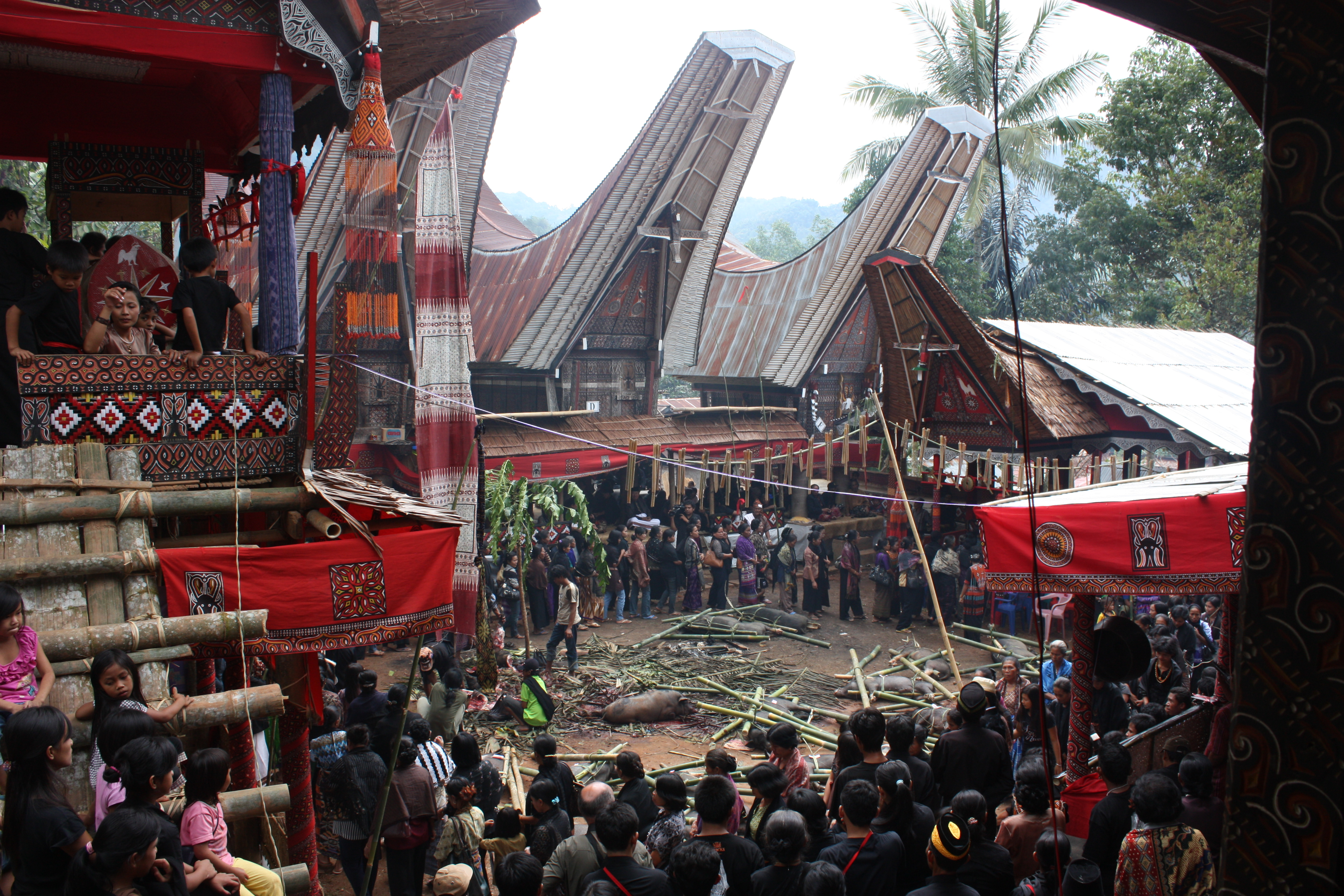
Slaughter of swine at a funeral

The Toraja are an ethnic group indigenous to a mountainous region of South Sulawesi, Indonesia. Torajans are renowned for their elaborate funeral rites, burial sites carved into rocky cliffs, and massive peaked-roof traditional houses known as tongkonan which are owned by noble families. Membership in a tongkonan is inherited by all descendants of its founders. Thus any individual may be a member of numerous tongkonan, as long as they contribute to its ritual events. Membership in a tongkonan carries benefits, such as the right to rent some of its rice fields.

Toraja funeral rites are important social events, usually attended by hundreds of people and lasting several days. The funerals are like "big men" competitions where all the descendants of a tongkonan compete through gifts of sacrificial cattle. Participants have invested cattle with others over the years, and draw on those extended networks to make the largest gift. The winner of the competition becomes the new owner of the tongkonan and its rice lands. They display all the cattle horns from their winning sacrifice on a pole in front of the tongkonan.

The Toraja funeral differs from the "big man" system in that the winner of the "gift" exchange gains control of the Tongkonan's property. It creates a clear social hierarchy between the noble owners of the tongkonan and its land, and the commoners who are forced to rent their fields from him. Since the owners of the tongkonan gain rent, they are better able to compete in the funeral gift exchanges, and their social rank is more stable than the "big man" system.

== Charity and alms giving ==
Anthropologist David Graeber argued that the great world religious traditions of charity and gift giving emerged almost simultaneously during the Axial Age (800 to 200 BCE), when coinage was invented and market economies were established on a continental basis. Graeber argues that these charity traditions emerged as a reaction against the nexus formed by coinage, slavery, military violence and the market (a "military-coinage" complex). The new world religions, including Hinduism, Judaism, Buddhism, Confucianism, Christianity, and Islam all sought to preserve "human economies" where money served to cement social relationships rather than purchase things (including people).

Charity and alms-giving are religiously sanctioned voluntary gifts given without expectation of return. However, case studies show that such gifting is not necessarily altruistic.

=== Merit making in Buddhist Thailand ===
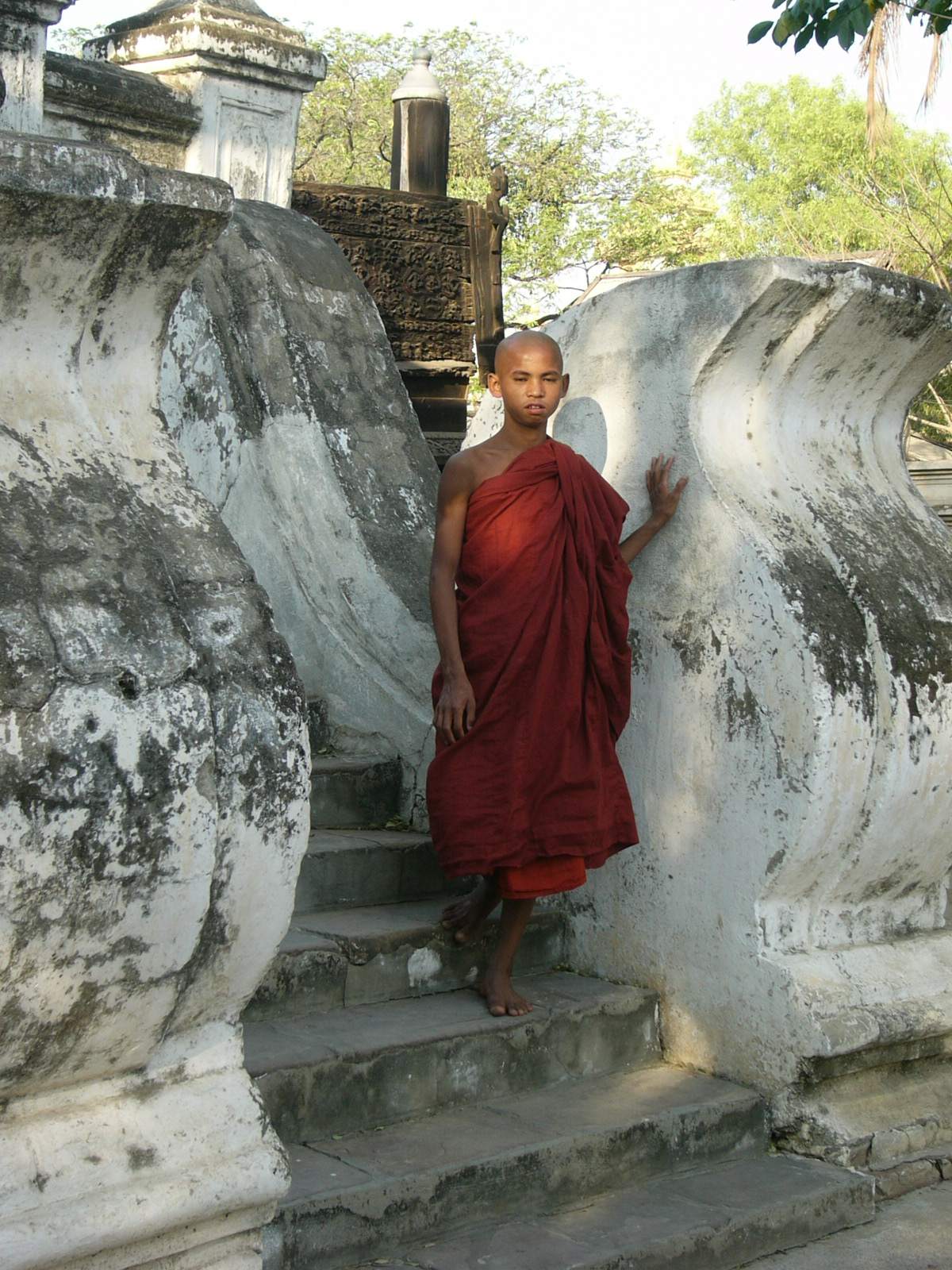
Young Burmese monk

Theravada Buddhism in Thailand emphasizes the importance of giving alms (merit making) without any intention of return (a pure gift), which is best accomplished according to doctrine, through gifts to monks and temples. The emphasis is on the selfless gifting which "earns merit" (and a future better life) for the giver rather than on the relief of the poor or the recipient on whom the gift is bestowed. However, Bowie's research shows that this ideal form of gifting is limited to the rich who have the resources to endow temples and sponsor the ordination of monks. Monks come from these same families, so this gifting doctrine has a class element. Poorer farmers place much less emphasis on merit making through gifts to monks and temples. They equally validate gifting to beggars. Poverty and famine is widespread among these poorer groups, and by validating gift-giving to beggars, they are in fact demanding that the rich see to their needs in hard times. Bowie sees this as an example of a moral economy (see below) in which the poor use gossip and reputation to resist elite exploitation and pressure them to ease their "this world" suffering.

=== Charity: Dana in India ===
Dāna is a form of religious charity given in Hindu India. The gift is said to embody the sins of the giver (the "poison of the gift"), whom it frees of evil by transmitting it to the recipient. The merit of the gift depends on finding a worthy recipient such as a Brahmin priest. Priests are supposed to be able to digest the sin through ritual action and transmit the gift with increment to someone of greater worth. It is imperative that this be a true gift, with no reciprocity, or the evil will return. The gift is not intended to create any relationship between donor and recipient, and there should never be a return gift. Dana thus transgresses the so-called universal "norm of reciprocity".

=== The Children of Peace in Canada ===
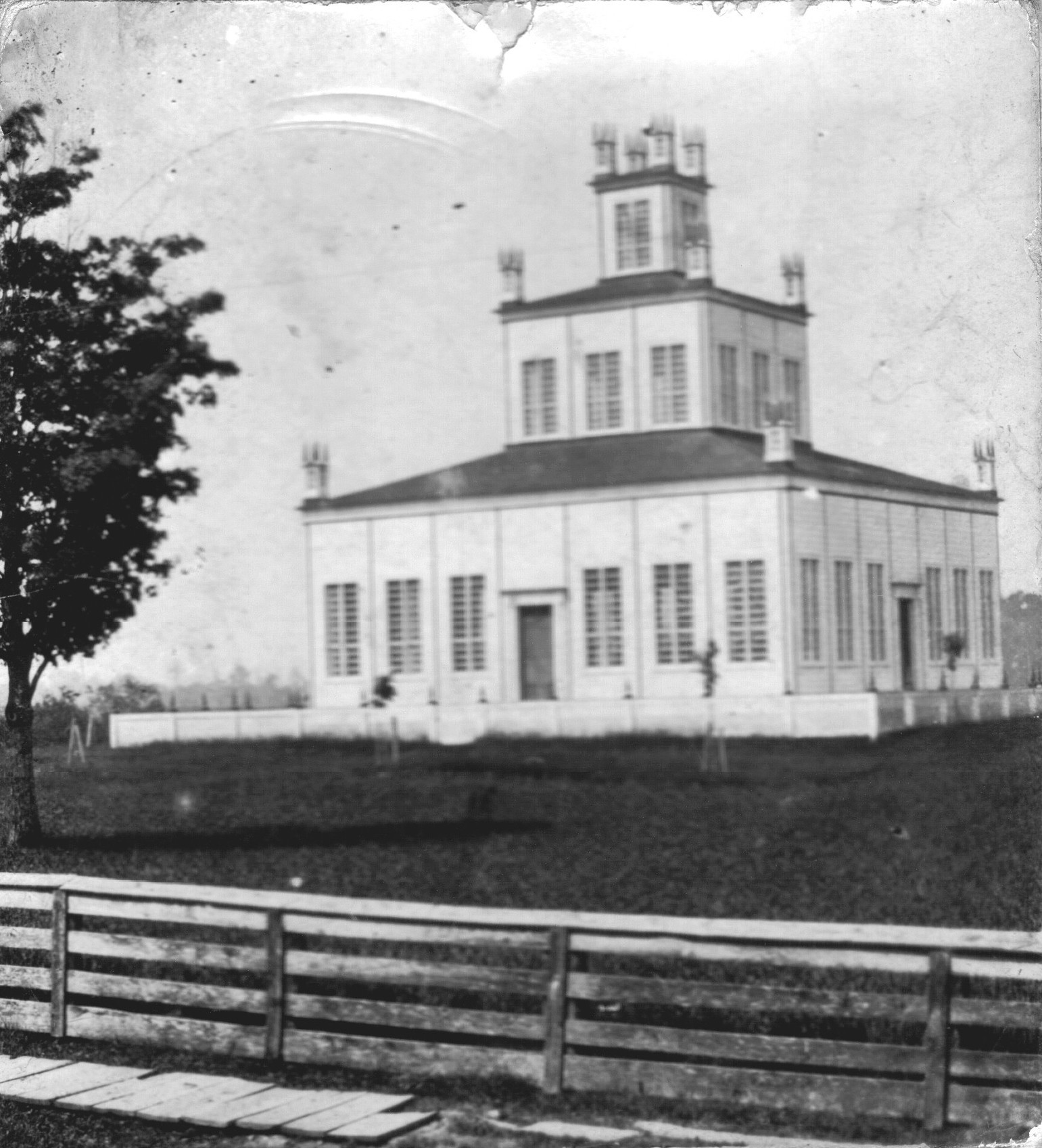
Sharon Temple

The Children of Peace (1812–1889) were a utopian Quaker sect. Today, they are primarily remembered for the Sharon Temple, a national historic site and an architectural symbol of their vision of a society based on the values of peace, equality and social justice. They built this ornate temple to raise money for the poor, and built the province of Ontario's first shelter for the homeless. They took a lead role in organizing the province's first co-operative, the Farmers' Storehouse, and opened the province's first credit union. The group soon found that the charity they tried to distribute from their Temple fund endangered the poor. Accepting charity was a sign of indebtedness, and the debtor could be jailed without trial at the time; this was the "poison of the gift". They thus transformed their charity fund into a credit union that loaned small sums like today's micro-credit institutions. This is an example of singularization, as money was transformed into charity in the Temple ceremony, then shifted to an alternative exchange sphere as a loan. Interest on the loan was then singularized, and transformed back into charity.

== Gifting as non-commodified exchange in market societies ==
Non-commodified spheres of exchange exist in relation to the market economy. They are created through the processes of singularization as specific objects are de-commodified for a variety of reasons and enter an alternative exchange sphere. It may be in opposition to the market and to its perceived greed. It may also be used by corporations as a means of creating a sense of endebtedness and loyalty in customers. Modern marketing techniques often aim at infusing commodity exchange with features of gift exchange, thus blurring the presumably sharp distinction between gifts and commodities.

=== Organ transplant networks, sperm and blood banks ===
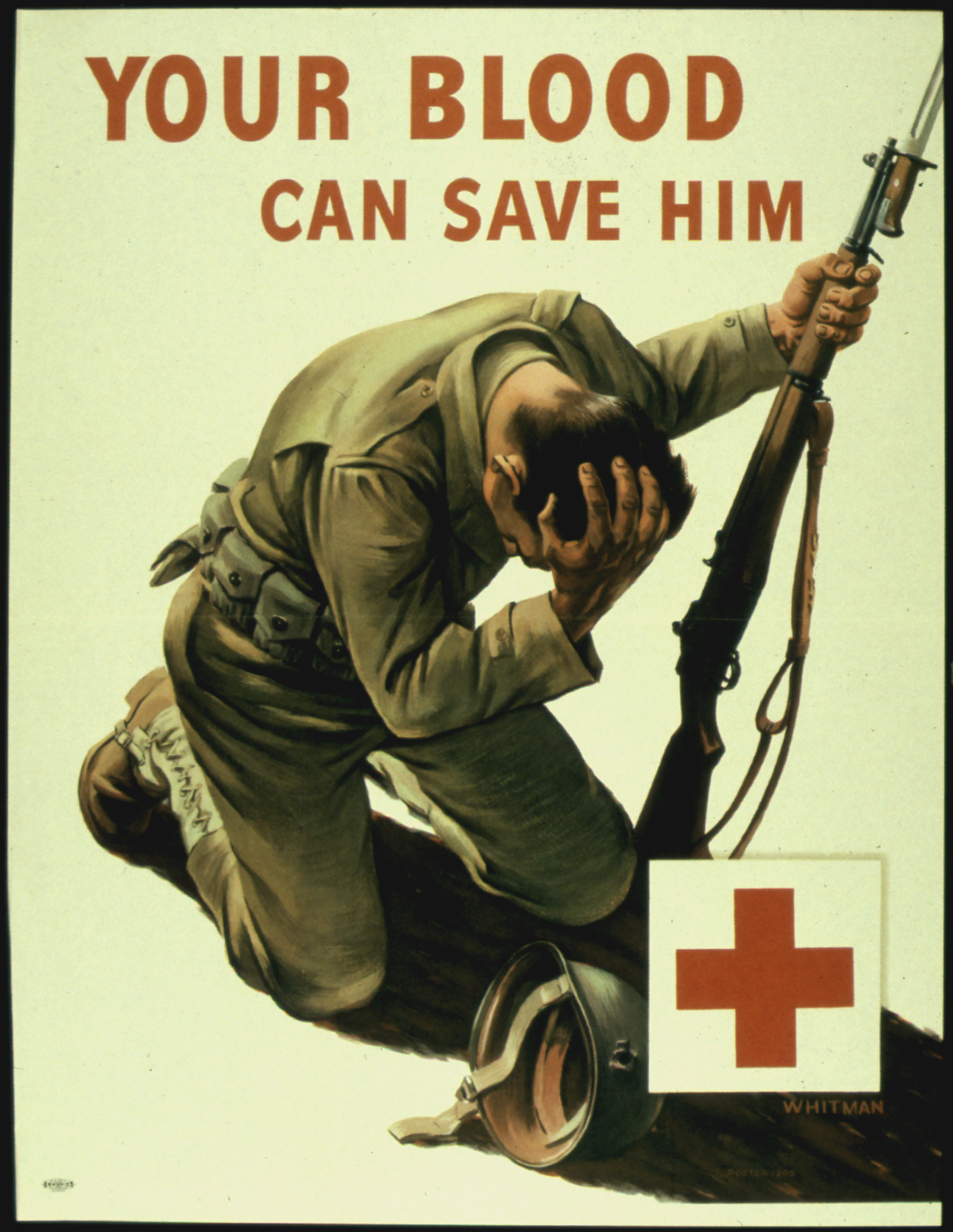
Blood donation poster, WWII

Market economies tend to "reduce everything – including human beings, their labor, and their reproductive capacity – to the status of commodities". "The rapid transfer of organ transplant technology to the third world has created a trade in organs, with sick bodies travelling to the Global South for transplants, and healthy organs from the Global South being transported to the richer Global North, "creating a kind of 'Kula ring' of bodies and body parts." However, all commodities can also be singularized, or de-commodified, and transformed into gifts. In North America, it is illegal to sell organs, and citizens are enjoined to give the "gift of life" and donate their organs in an organ gift economy. However, this gift economy is a "medical realm rife with potent forms of mystified commodification". This multimillion-dollar medical industry requires clients to pay steep fees for the gifted organ, which creates clear class divisions between those who donate (often in the global south) and will never benefit from gifted organs, and those who can pay the fees and thereby receive a gifted organ.

Unlike body organs, blood and semen have been successfully and legally commodified in the United States. Blood and semen can thus be commodified, but once consumed are "the gift of life". Although both can be either donated or sold, are perceived as the "gift of life" yet are stored in "banks", and can be collected only under strict government regulated procedures, recipients very clearly prefer altruistically donated semen and blood. The blood and semen samples with the highest market value are those that have been altruistically donated. The recipients view semen as storing the potential characteristics of their unborn child in its DNA, and value altruism over greed. Similarly, gifted blood is the archetype of a pure gift relationship because the donor is only motivated by a desire to help others.

=== Copyleft vs copyright: the gift of "free" speech ===
Engineers, scientists and software developers have created free software projects such as the Linux kernel and the GNU operating system. They are prototypical examples for the gift economy's prominence in the technology sector, and its active role in instating the use of permissive free software and copyleft licenses, which allow free reuse of software and knowledge. Other examples include file-sharing, open access, unlicensed software and so on.

=== Points and loyalty programs ===
Many retail organizations have "gift" programs meant to encourage customer loyalty to their establishments. Bird-David and Darr refer to these as hybrid "mass-gifts" which are neither gift nor commodity. They are called mass-gifts because they are given away in large numbers "free with purchase" in a mass-consumption environment. They give as an example two bars of soap in which one is given free with purchase: which is the commodity and which the gift? The mass-gift both affirms the distinct difference between gift and commodity while confusing it at the same time. As with gifting, mass-gifts are used to create a social relationship. Some customers embrace the relationship and gift whereas others reject the gift relationship and interpret the "gift" as a 50% off sale.

=== Free shops ===
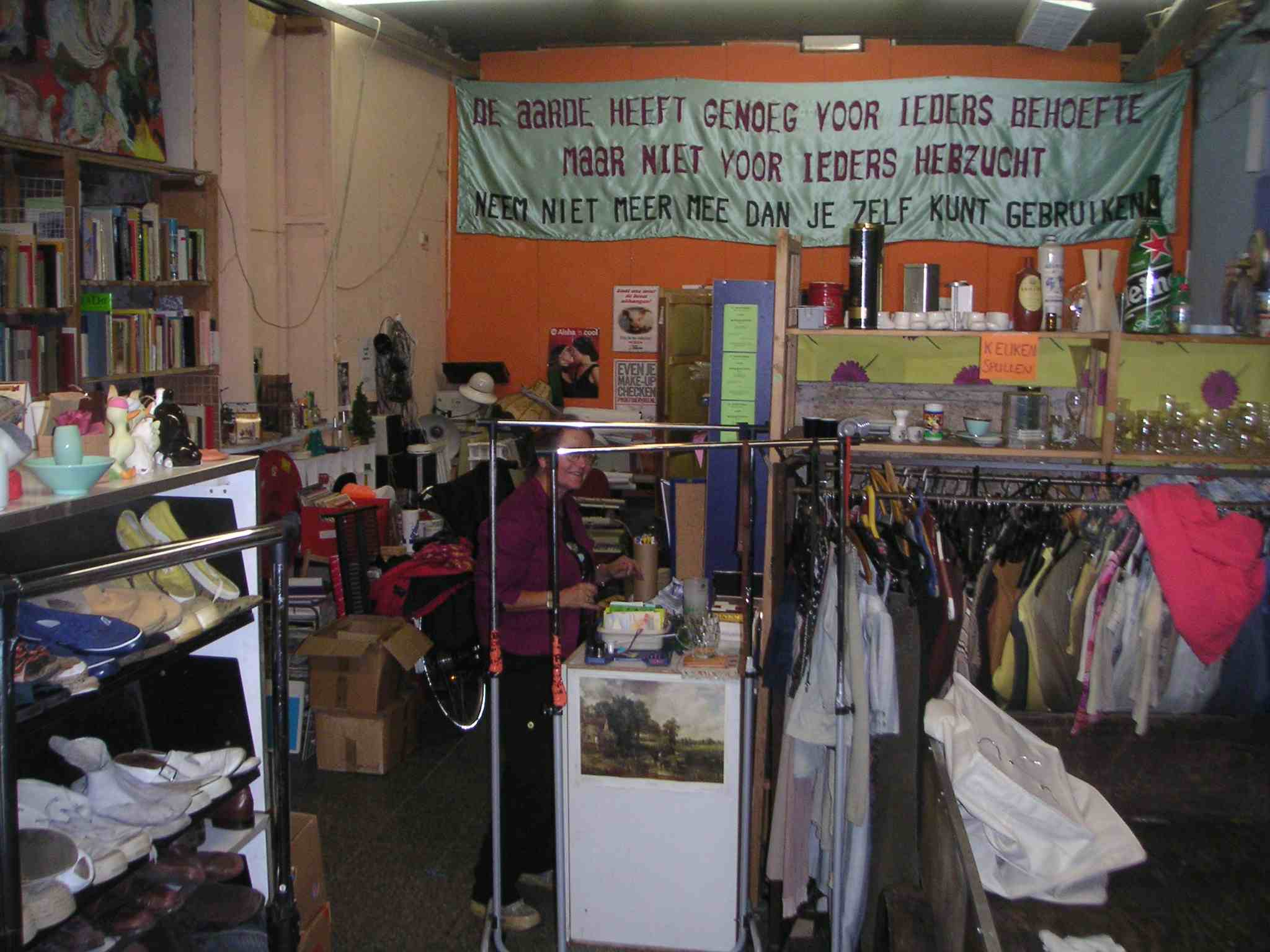
Inside Utrecht Giveaway shop. The banner reads "The earth has enough for everyone's need, but not for everyone's greed".

"Give-away shops", "freeshops" or "free stores" are stores where all goods are free. They are similar to charity shops, with mostly second-hand items – only everything is available at no cost. Whether it is a book, a piece of furniture, a garment or a household item, it is all freely given away, although some operate a one-in, one-out–type policy (swap shops). The free store is a form of constructive direct action that provides a shopping alternative to a monetary framework, allowing people to exchange goods and services outside a money-based economy. The anarchist 1960s countercultural group The Diggers opened free stores which gave away their stock, provided free food, distributed free drugs, gave away money, organized free music concerts, and performed works of political art. The Diggers took their name from the original English Diggers led by Gerrard Winstanley and sought to create a mini-society free of money and capitalism.

=== Burning Man ===
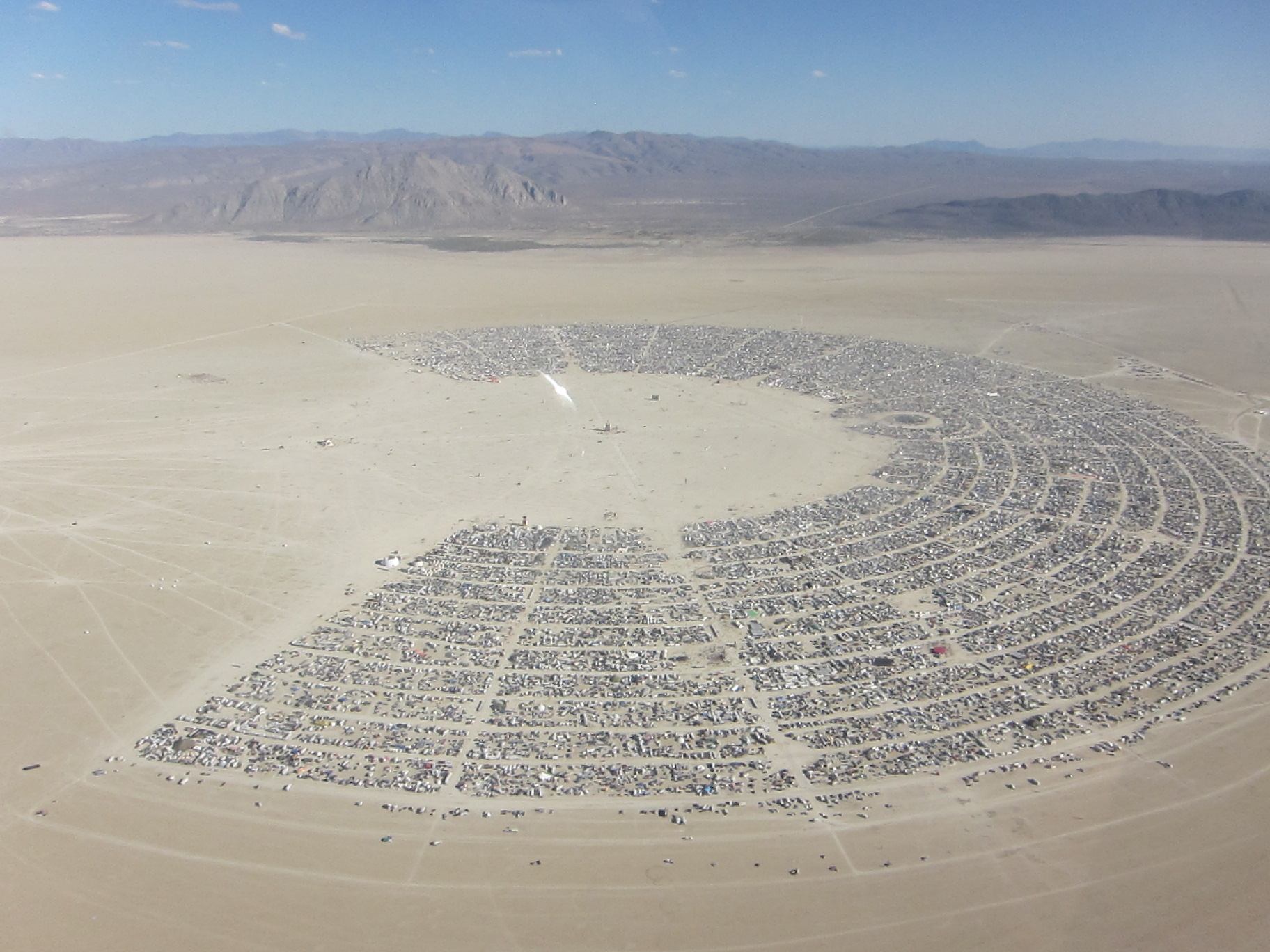
Black Rock City, the temporary settlement created in the Nevada Desert for Burning Man, 2010

Burning Man is a week-long annual art and community event held in the Black Rock Desert in northern Nevada, in the United States. The event is described as an experiment in community, radical self-expression, and radical self-reliance. The event forbids commerce (except for ice, coffee, and tickets to the event itself) and encourages gifting. Gifting is one of the event's 10 principles, as participants to Burning Man (both the desert festival and the year-round global community) are encouraged to rely on a gift economy. The practice of gifting at Burning Man is also documented by the 2002 documentary film Gifting It: A Burning Embrace of Gift Economy, as well as by Making Contact's radio show "How We Survive: The Currency of Giving [encore]".

=== Cannabis market in the District of Columbia and U.S. states ===
According to the Associated Press, "Gift-giving has long been a part of marijuana culture" and has accompanied legalization in U.S. states in the 2010s. Voters in the District of Columbia legalized the growing of cannabis for personal recreational use by approving Initiative 71 in November 2014, but the 2015 "Cromnibus" Federal appropriations bills prevented the District from creating a system to allow for its commercial sale. Possession, growth, and use of the drug by adults is legal in the District, as is giving it away, but sale and barter of it is not, in effect attempting to create a gift economy. However it ended up creating a commercial market linked to selling other objects. Preceding the January, 2018 legalization of cannabis possession in Vermont without a corresponding legal framework for sales, it was expected that a similar market would emerge there. For a time, people in Portland, Oregon, could only legally obtain cannabis as a gift, which was celebrated in the Burnside Burn rally. For a time, a similar situation ensued after possession was legalized in California, Maine and Massachusetts.

== Related concepts ==
=== Mutual aid ===
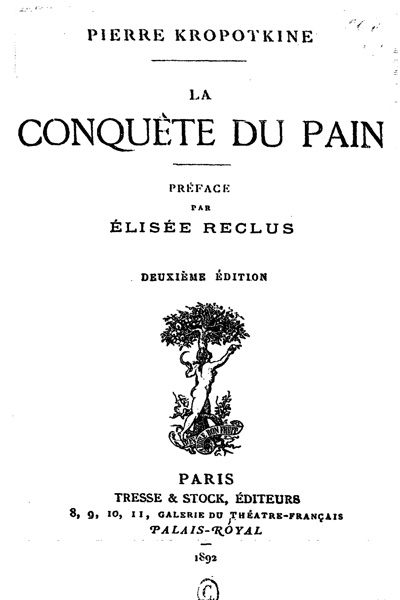
The Conquest of Bread by Peter Kropotkin, influential work which presents the economic vision of anarcho-communism

Many anarchists, particularly anarcho-primitivists and anarcho-communists, believe that variations on a gift economy may be the key to breaking the cycle of poverty. Therefore, they often desire to refashion all of society into a gift economy. Anarcho-communists advocate a gift economy as an ideal, with neither money, nor markets, nor planning. This view traces back at least to Peter Kropotkin, who saw in the hunter-gatherer tribes he had visited the paradigm of "mutual aid". In place of a market, anarcho-communists, such as those who lived in some Spanish villages in the 1930s, support a gift economy without currency, where goods and services are produced by workers and distributed in community stores where everyone (including the workers who produced them) is essentially entitled to consume whatever they want or need as payment for their production of goods and services.

As an intellectual abstraction, mutual aid was developed and advanced by mutualism or labor insurance systems and thus trade unions, and has been also used in cooperatives and other civil society movements. Typically, mutual-aid groups are free to join and participate in, and all activities are voluntary. Often they are structured as non-hierarchical, non-bureaucratic non-profit organizations, with members controlling all resources and no external financial or professional support. They are member-led and member-organized. They are egalitarian in nature, and designed to support participatory democracy, equality of member status and power, and shared leadership and cooperative decision-making. Members' external societal status is considered irrelevant inside the group: status in the group is conferred by participation.

=== Moral economy ===
English historian E.P. Thompson wrote about the moral economy of the poor in the context of widespread English food riots in the English countryside in the late 18th century. Thompson claimed that these riots were generally peaceable acts that demonstrated a common political culture rooted in feudal rights to "set the price" of essential goods in the market. These peasants believed that a traditional "fair price" was more important to the community than a "free" market price and they punished large farmers who sold their surpluses at higher prices outside the village while some village members still needed produce. Thus a moral economy is an attempt to preserve an alternative exchange sphere from market penetration. The notion of peasants with a non-capitalist cultural mentality using the market for their own ends has been linked to subsistence agriculture and the need for subsistence insurance in hard times. However, James C. Scott points out that those who provide this subsistence insurance to the poor in bad years are wealthy patrons who exact a political cost for their aid; this aid is given to recruit followers. The concept of moral economy has been used to explain why peasants in a number of colonial contexts, such as the Vietnam War, have rebelled.

=== The commons ===
Some may confuse common property regimes with gift exchange systems. The commons is the cultural and natural resources accessible to all members of a society, including natural materials such as air, water, and a habitable earth. These resources are held in common, not owned privately. The resources held in common can include everything from natural resources and common land to software. The commons contains public property and private property, over which people have certain traditional rights. When commonly held property is transformed into private property this process is called "enclosure" or "privatization". A person who has a right in, or over, common land jointly with another or others is called a commoner.

There are a number of important aspects that can be used to describe true commons. The first is that the commons cannot be commodified – if they are, they cease to be commons. The second aspect is that unlike private property, the commons are inclusive rather than exclusive – their nature is to share ownership as widely, rather than as narrowly, as possible. The third aspect is that the assets in commons are meant to be preserved regardless of their return of capital. Just as we receive them as a shared right, so we have a duty to pass them on to future generations in at least the same condition as we received them. If we can add to their value, so much the better, but at a minimum we must not degrade them, and we certainly have no right to destroy them.

=== New intellectual commons: free content ===
Free content, or free information, is any kind of functional work, artwork, or other creative content that meets the definition of a free cultural work. A free cultural work is one which has no significant legal restriction on people's freedom:

- To use the content and benefit from using it,
- To study the content and apply what is learned,
- To make and distribute copies of the content,
- To change and improve the content and distribute these derivative works.

Although different definitions are used, free content is legally similar if not identical to open content. An analogy is the use of the rival terms free software and open source which describe ideological differences rather than legal ones. Free content encompasses all works in the public domain and also those copyrighted works whose licenses honor and uphold the freedoms mentioned above. Because copyright law in most countries by default grants copyright holders monopolistic control over their creations, copyright content must be explicitly declared free, usually by the referencing or inclusion of licensing statements from within the work.

Although a work which is in the public domain because its copyright has expired is considered free, it can become non-free again if the copyright law changes.

Information is particularly suited to gift economies, as information is a nonrival good and can be gifted at practically no cost (zero marginal cost). In fact, there is often an advantage to using the same software or data formats as others, so even from a selfish perspective, it can be advantageous to give away one's information.

==== Filesharing ====
Markus Giesler, in his ethnography Consumer Gift System, described music downloading as a system of social solidarity based on gift transactions. As Internet access spread, file sharing became extremely popular among users who could contribute and receive files on line. This form of gift economy was a model for online services such as Napster, which focused on music sharing and was later sued for copyright infringement. Nonetheless, online file sharing persists in various forms such as BitTorrent and direct download link. A number of communications and intellectual property experts such as Henry Jenkins and Lawrence Lessig have described file-sharing as a form of gift exchange which provides many benefits to artists and consumers alike. They have argued that file sharing fosters community among distributors and allows for a more equitable distribution of media.

==== Free and open-source software ====
In his essay "Homesteading the Noosphere", noted computer programmer Eric S. Raymond said that free and open-source software developers have created "a 'gift culture' in which participants compete for prestige by giving time, energy, and creativity away". Prestige gained as a result of contributions to source code fosters a social network for the developer; the open source community will recognize the developer's accomplishments and intelligence. Consequently, the developer may find more opportunities to work with other developers. However, prestige is not the only motivator for the giving of lines of code. An anthropological study of the Fedora community, as part of a master's study at the University of North Texas in 2010–11, found that common reasons given by contributors were "learning for the joy of learning and collaborating with interesting and smart people". Motivation for personal gain, such as career benefits, was more rarely reported. Many of those surveyed said things like, "Mainly I contribute just to make it work for me", and "programmers develop software to 'scratch an itch'". The International Institute of Infonomics at the University of Maastricht in the Netherlands reported in 2002 that in addition to the above, large corporations, and they specifically mentioned IBM, also spend large annual sums employing developers specifically for them to contribute to open source projects. The firms' and the employees' motivations in such cases are less clear.

Members of the Linux community often speak of their community as a gift economy. The IT research firm IDC valued the Linux kernel at US$18 billion in 2007 and projected its value at US$40 billion in 2010. The Debian distribution of the Linux operating system offers over 37,000 free open-source software packages via their AMD64 repositories alone.

==== Collaborative works ====
Collaborative works are works created by an open community. For example, Wikipedia – a free online encyclopedia – features millions of articles developed collaboratively, and almost none of its many authors and editors receive any direct material reward.

== See also ==
- Anarchist economics
- Baksheesh
- Basic income
- Blat (favors)
- Brownie points
- Calculation in kind
- Cargo cult
- Digital currency
- Eidiyah
- Egoboo
- Food swap
- Free education
- Giving circles
- Gratitude trap
- History of money
- Homestay – CouchSurfing
- Knowledge market
- Natural economy
- Pay it forward
- Post-scarcity economy
- Primitive communism
- Red envelope
- Round of drinks
- Sharing economy
- Solidarity economy
- World currency
