= Martha Daniell Logan =

American botanist and writer

- Born: December 29, 1704; St. Thomas Parish, South Carolina
- Died: June 28, 1779 (aged 74); Charleston, South Carolina
- Known for: Seed exchange Plant collecting
- Spouse: George Logan, Jr.
- Scientific career
- Fields: Botany

Martha Daniell Logan (29 December 1704 - 28 June 1779) was an early American botanist who was instrumental in seed exchanges between Britain and the North American colonies. She wrote an influential gardening advice column and was a major collector of plants endemic to the Carolinas.

== Early life and education ==
Born in St. Thomas Parish, South Carolina, on 29 December 1704, to a wealthy family. She was the daughter of Robert Daniell and Martha Wainwright. Her father, Robert Daniell, was appointed to two terms as South Carolina's lieutenant governor and was a prominent merchant. Martha Daniell was taught to read and write by a private tutor. After her father's death in 1718, Martha Daniell inherited his property along the Wando River. In 1719, Martha married George Logan, Jr. Over the next sixteen years, she gave birth to eight children, six surviving to adulthood. The Logans moved from their Wandon home to a plantation near Charleston, South Carolina, and began her botanical collections in the nearby woods.

== Career ==
After her husband died in 1742, Martha experienced financial difficulties. In 1742, Martha placed an advertisement in the South Carolina Gazette, offering to board children and teach them to read and write. Her son Robert began to advertise imported seeds, flower roots, and fruit stones, sparking further interest into horticulture. In 1751, Martha wrote a column titled "Gardener's Kalendar" for the South Carolina Gazette.

Though further financial trouble caused her to have to sell her plantation in 1753. Martha moved to Charleston and sold rare seeds and roots and delved more seriously into her studies of botany. She continued to collect plants, seeds, and other botanical materials, and also began to correspond extensively with the royal botanist at the time, John Bartram. Bartram, stationed in Philadelphia, exchanged samples and communicated regularly with Logan.

Logan died in Charleston at the age of 75, on 28 June 1779.

== See also ==
- Timeline of women in science
