= Validly published name =

In botanical nomenclature, a name that meets the requirements for valid publication

In botanical nomenclature, a validly published name is a name that meets the requirements in the International Code of Nomenclature for algae, fungi, and plants (ICN) for valid publication. Valid publication of a name represents the minimum requirements for a botanical name to exist: terms that appear to be names but have not been validly published are referred to in the ICN as "designations".

A validly published name may not satisfy all the requirements to be legitimate. It is also not necessarily the correct name for a particular taxon and rank.

Names that are not valid by ICN standards (nomen invalidum, nom. inval.) are sometimes in use. This may occur when a taxonomist finds and recognises a taxon and thinks of a name, but delays publishing it in an adequate manner. A common reason to delay valid publication is that a taxonomist intends to write a magnum opus that provides an overview of the group, rather than a series of small papers. Another reason is that the code of nomenclature changes with time, and most changes have retroactive effect, which has resulted in some names becoming invalid that the author thought were validly published.

== Historical development ==
Early versions of the International Code of Nomenclature (1958, 1966) explicitly defined a name as "a name which has been validly published, whether legitimate or illegitimate". This clear definition helped establish the foundational principle that valid publication is a prerequisite for any nomenclatural status. More recent versions of various nomenclatural codes have maintained this concept while evolving their specific language and requirements. Valid publication refers to meeting a defined set of rules rather than conforming to all rules in a nomenclatural code, separating the basic requirements for a name to exist from other rules that determine its legitimacy or proper usage.

== Nomenclatural terms ==
A "designation" has a specific meaning in the Code: it refers to what appears to be a name but either (1) has not been validly published and hence is not a name in the sense of the Code, or (2) is not to be regarded as a name. The term "potential name" has been proposed for cases where the status of a name as validly published or not has yet to be determined, such as when waiting for a committee decision on whether a descriptive statement qualifies as a validating description.

A key distinction is that publication of a name in a dictionary, standalone index, or review that solely purports to report nomenclature or taxonomic systems of previously published works does not constitute acceptance of the name by any author. For example, when a name appears in an index merely recording names accepted by original authors, without explicit acceptance by the compilers themselves, it does not achieve valid publication status through that index. This principle helps maintain clarity about when names are truly validly published versus when they are simply being recorded or referenced.

The distinction between these terms is important in practice. While the Code allows phrases like "intended name" or "intended new combination", these terms are only used for designations - names that have not achieved valid publication status. A designation in botanical nomenclature can refer to either an attempted but invalid name, or to the process of establishing a type specimen for a name (type designation). These two uses can sometimes appear in the same context, though they have different implications: a type designation is usually an effective typification, while a designation in the sense of an invalid name has no nomenclatural status.

== Requirements for effective publication ==
Under the International Code of Nomenclature for algae, fungi, and plants, publication can be effected in two ways:

1. Distribution of printed matter (through sale, exchange, or gift) to the general public or at least to scientific institutions with generally accessible libraries.
2. Distribution on or after 1 January 2012 of electronic material in Portable Document Format (PDF) in an online publication with an International Standard Serial Number (ISSN) or an International Standard Book Number (ISBN).

Publication is not effected by:

- Communication of nomenclatural novelties at a public meeting
- Placing names in collections or gardens open to the public
- Issue of microfilm made from manuscripts or typescripts
- Distribution of electronic material in formats other than PDF
- Publication by indelible autograph (a signature or handwritten text that is written in a permanent, non-erasable form) after 1 January 1953
- Publication in trade catalogues or non-scientific newspapers (after 1 January 1953)
- Publication in seed-exchange lists (after 1 January 1973)
- Distribution of printed matter accompanying specimens (after 1 January 1953)

Electronic publications must meet additional requirements:

- The content must not be preliminary or subject to later revision
- The content must not be altered after publication
- "Online" means accessible via the World Wide Web
- The PDF format may be succeeded by another standard format as communicated by the General Committee

== In microbiology ==
The International Code of Nomenclature of Prokaryotes inherits the concept of a valid publication from the ICBN. To be considered valid, a name must be found in the Approved Lists of Bacterial Names, or is published in the International Journal of Systematic and Evolutionary Microbiology (formerly the International Journal of Systematic Bacteriology). The name must, of course, conform to the Code. Names that satisfy the code but not found in these sources are effectively published as long as the journal is sufficiently recognized. Effective names can be made valid through "Validation List" publications made to the IJSEM. In addition, it is possible to validate a binomial name without the genus being validated.

The relationship between valid publication and legitimacy follows a specific order in prokaryotic nomenclature. A name must first be validly published before it can be considered either legitimate or illegitimate under the Code. Names that fail to meet the requirements for valid publication have no nomenclatural status and cannot be evaluated for legitimacy. Two examples illustrate this process: when Thalassobius gelatinovorus was first proposed in 2005, it was published with only one type strain deposit instead of the required two. Rather than being both invalid and illegitimate, the name simply lacked valid publication status until it was properly validated the following year with multiple strain deposits. Similarly, the bacterial genus name Rhizomonas (1990) demonstrates how valid publication must precede legitimacy determinations – the name was first validly published, which then allowed it to be evaluated and ultimately declared illegitimate due to being a homonym of an earlier protozoan genus name.

== Contrast to zoology ==
In zoology, the term "valid name" has a different meaning, analogous to (corresponding to) the botanical term "correct name". The term "validly published name" is more like (and it corresponds to) the zoological term "available name".

== See also ==
- Glossary of scientific naming
- Nomen nudum, a particular kind of invalid name in zoology and botany
- Undescribed taxon, recognized as distinct by at least one biologist, but the name is not validly published
