= George Dalton (economist) =

George Dalton (1926–91) was a noted New York born economic anthropologist. Following Karl Polanyi's work (The Great Transformation(1944)), he helped promote and develop the substantivist approach. Dalton studied under Polanyi at Columbia (1950–51), did a PhD in economics at the University of Oregon (1959) and then went on to work at Northwestern University between 1961 and his death in 1991. Andre Gunder Frank produced fierce criticisms of Dalton's approach (and Dalton has a nice reply).

== Selected publications ==
- Paul Bohannan and George Dalton, eds. 1962. Markets in Africa. Evanston, IL: Northwestern University Press.
- Dalton, George, ed. 1967. Tribal and Peasant Economies: Readings in Economic Anthropology. Garden City, NY: Natural History Press.
- Dalton, George, ed. 1968. Primitive, Archaic, and Modern Economies: Essays of Karl Polanyi. Garden City, NY: Anchor Books.
- Dalton, George, ed. 1971. Economic Development and Social Change: The Modernization of Village Communities. Garden City, NY: The Natural History Press.
- Dalton, George. 1971. Economic Anthropology and Development: Essays on Tribal and Peasant Economies. New York: Basic Books.
- Dalton, George.ed. 1971. Studies in Economic Anthropology. Washington, DC: American Anthropological Association.
- Dalton, George. 1975 Economic Systems and Society: Capitalism, Communism, and the Third World, Penguin
