= Gratitude trap =

Type of cognitive distortion

The gratitude trap is a type of cognitive distortion that typically arises from misunderstandings regarding the nature or practice of gratitude. It is closely related to fallacies such as emotional reasoning and the "fallacy of change" identified by psychologists and psychotherapists such as John M. Grohol, Peter Ledden, and others.

== Definition ==
The phrase "gratitude trap" can refer to one of several related but distinct thought processes. Relatively few mental health professionals have written about gratitude traps, which could explain the term’s limited use and ambiguity.

The most common interpretation of "gratitude trap" describes a self-oriented thought process involving feelings of guilt, shame, or frustration related to one’s expectations of how things "should" be. Kelley Hattox, CADC-II identifies several subtypes of gratitude traps:

- Toxic positivity describes insincere cheerfulness based on self-imposed or societal expectations (i.e., "fake it till you make it").
- Inauthentic gratitude is the expression of gratitude for a gift or service for which one is not actually appreciative.
- Shame-based gratitude is the attempt to reject or suppress legitimate negative emotions in the name of "focusing on the positive."
- Comparative gratitude, also known as the "could be worse" trap, occurs when a person deemphasizes real sources of stress or dissatisfaction by attempting to force a feeling of gratitude for not being in an even less desirable situation.

Doctor of Clinical Psychology Ashley Curiel writes about a concept she calls the "Should trap," which subsumes the narrower concept of a gratitude trap:

In essence, denying what actually is and feeling that a situation or person should be different to make our lives better is a cognitive distortion. When we feel that some other person or entity is the cause of our misery, we are in some ways acting entitled, as if the world should bend to our wishes and needs. . . . It is not someone else’s responsibility to remove all obstacles and make a smooth path to our success and comfort.

Psychologist Ellen Kenner uses the term "gratitude trap" more narrowly to describe irrational feelings of indebtedness in interpersonal relationships:

The phrase "gratitude trap" describes an elusive ugliness in many relationships, a deceptive "kindness," the main purpose of which is to make others feel indebted. Often, its victims feel guilty because they don’t feel grateful and don’t want the burden of reciprocating but nonetheless think that they ought to.

In Kenner’s view, gratitude traps typically are rooted in "unearned guilt"—that is, feelings of guilt which "[stem] from thoughts or actions that are, in fact, not wrong, and about which guilt is not warranted." The form of gratitude trap that Kenner describes is often experienced by victims of gaslighting or other forms of emotional abuse.

== History ==
Few academics and mental health professionals have studied or written about the gratitude trap specifically. In the mid-1990s, psychiatrists Aaron T. Beck and David Burns became the first to study cognitive distortions in depth, and portions of their research describe thought patterns substantially similar to gratitude traps. Gratitude traps also overlap somewhat with the phenomenon of "musterbation," a term coined by psychotherapist and psychologist Albert Ellis to describe self-imposed expectations that are unrealistic or otherwise unhealthy.

== Examples ==
Instances of gratitude traps are ubiquitous in everyday life, although most aren’t consciously identified. Examples could include:

- A man who gives his friend a gift he thinks she should want rather than the gift she actually wants; the friend feels "trapped" by inauthentic gratitude
- A low-income student who occasionally can’t afford to eat but downplays or ignores his hunger because some other people have it worse
- A woman who stays in an abusive relationship because she feels indebted to her abuser, who provides food and shelter

== Effects ==
Regardless of their exact form, gratitude traps can have significant negative effects on one’s psychological health, including reduced self-esteem, motivation, and ambition, as well as irrational feelings of guilt or inadequacy.

In the most serious cases, gratitude traps can perpetuate long-term abuse. Perpetua Neo, DClinPsy, writes: "Like most well-intentioned ways of life, gratitude must be used with discernment, especially when it stops us from seeing a situation realistically. Or when someone else manipulates the situation and uses gratitude to keep us trapped." She notes that abusers often leverage gratitude to "transgress your boundaries in subtle ways. Every time you stand up for yourself, they tell you you’re crazy or ungrateful. You feel guilty. They punish you for behavior that doesn’t suit them and reward you every time you do what they want. So, like a trained dog, you learn to cave in."

== Treatment ==
Some mental health professionals, including Beck, Burns, and Ellis, recommend cognitive restructuring (CR), a form of cognitive behavioral therapy (CBT), for the treatment of many cognitive distortions, including gratitude traps. Because gratitude traps are a form of irrational thinking, effective treatment methods tend to emphasize the importance of encouraging the patient to recognize, challenge, and eventually correct their own false beliefs or assumptions.

== See also ==
- Brownie points
- Cognitive distortion
- Gift economy
- Psychological manipulation
