= Food swap =

Gathering where food is bartered for other food

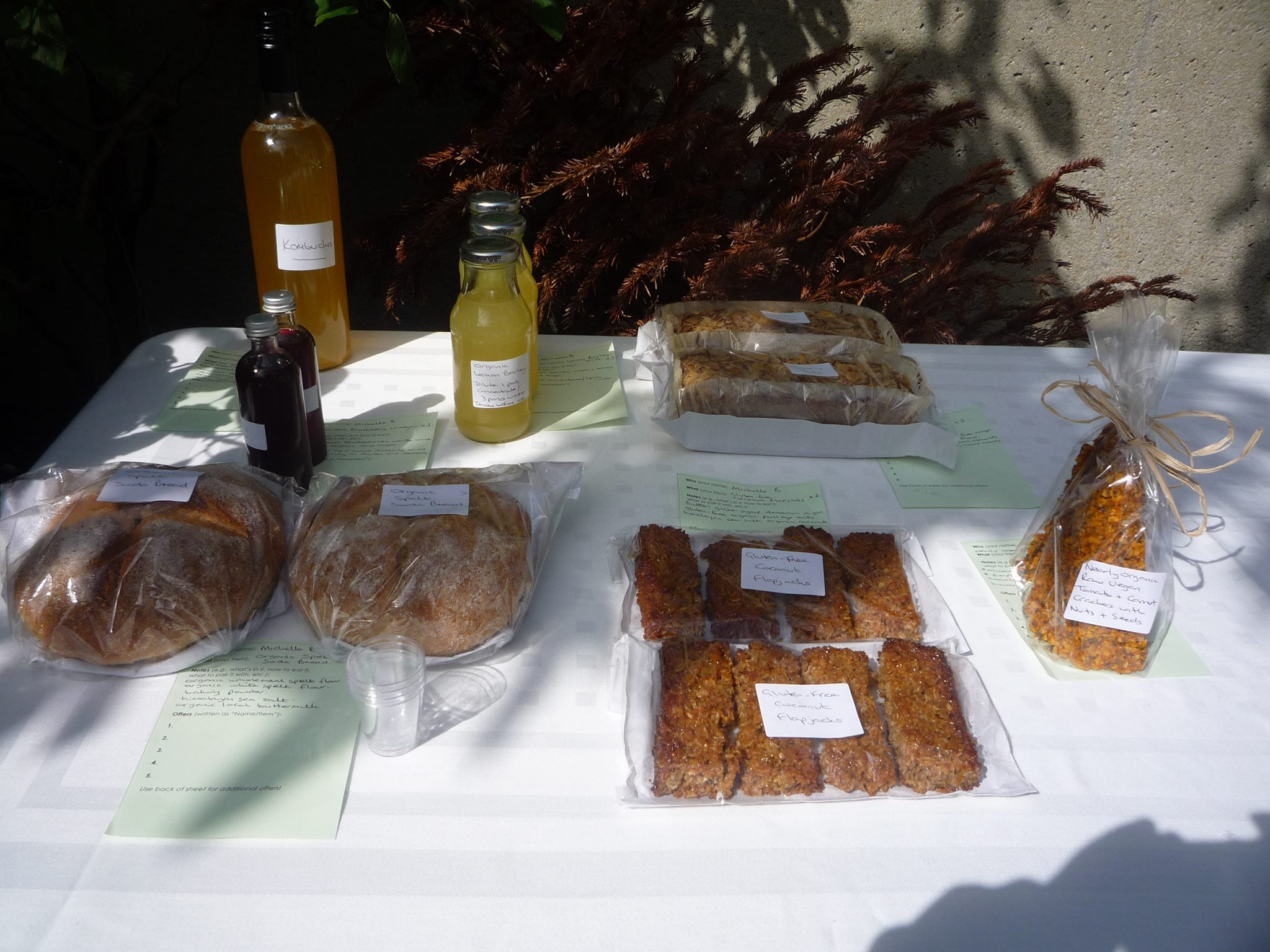
Items laid out on a table ready for a food swap event

Food swaps are events where members of a local community meet up to share homemade, homegrown, and foraged foods with each other. Apart from diversifying their larders and redistributing surpluses and gluts, they provide opportunities for building stronger communities, and picking up tips. No money changes hands. Attendees bring items that they wish to swap and then bid for each other's produce, either verbally or on cards in the form of a silent auction, until suitable swaps are negotiated. Often attendees bring extra items either as free samples or as contributions to a potluck lunch or tea, so that there is more time to get to know each other, exchange gossip and pass on tips.

== History ==
Food has been swapped and traded since prehistoric times, from cacao beans to spices, fresh-killed meat to foraged berries. The Food Swap Network started in Brooklyn, New York in 2010, and 125 groups have been established across the US and Canada, as well as in Europe including the UK. 'Apples for Eggs' is a produce-sharing network set up in the UK in 2011. 'Apples for Eggs' has 159 registered swappers and organises events in York, Ormskirk, Henley, Stoke, and Brampton in Cumbria. There are similar events in Brazil, Denmark, France and the Netherlands.

== Procedure ==
There are several networks that organise food swaps, but anyone can create an event. The organisers provide premises, which may be a person's home, or a community building, publicise the event, and may also provide swapping cards or in some other way specify a procedure to be followed. The organisers may also provide tables and seating and may lay on teas and coffees for the attendees, or at least provide hot water and utensils for them to make their own.

Attendees may be advised to package their produce both for good looks and for transportability. While attendees kitchens are unlikely to be certified nut-free or have Food Standards Agency guarantees of cleanliness, swappers may be asked to specify ingredients, whether an item can be considered vegetarian or vegan, storage instructions, and a suggested use-by date, all based on trust and judgement.

Items may be grouped into swappable units, for example six cup-cakes may be equivalent to one loaf of bread, or three small fresh-caught fish. Swappers cruise the room, noting their interest by filling in bid cards at the different stands before the big exchange starts. Teas and coffees, or a potluck lunch provide an opportunity for people to get to know each other, and to swap recipes and tips. Attendees are usually asked to bring free samples of their wares, or some other items to share with others during the lunch or tea. Afterwards, bid cards are finalised, and finally, people actually swap their goods with others and clear up the room.

If a food swap event last two hours, the timetable may be as follows: During the first 30 minutes people sign-in, set-up, and greetings go on. Swappers fill out name tags and swap sheets and set up their wares on the tables. The next 30 minutes to 1 hour are for everyone to walk around, examine, and sample items from other swappers, writing swap bids on other swappers' cards. Potluck tea or lunch may take place here too. The final 30 minutes are when all the swapping actually happens. Everyone goes back to their own bid cards, looks at the offers, finds interested offers via their name tags, and swaps.

== Reception ==
Organisers of food swaps say the idea is part of a "new type of collectivism" including skills sharing and clothes swapping, and that it also feeds into current trends for thrift, recycling and making things yourself. The aims of food swapping are said to be to reduce waste, save people money, and bring communities together. Vicky Swift, who runs 'Apples for Eggs', told the BBC that the growing popularity of food swaps is about more than just food. "They are really social events and you get such a mix of people, from university students to pensioners. I think people like the sense of community that a food swap provides and you meet like-minded people with the same interests. People mingle, chat and swap expertise." She added to The Telegraph, "There’s something very bonding about exchanging goods with someone you haven’t met before, and when you meet them again, you feel you’ve made a lasting connection. We really are seeing little communities blossom around these events."

Martin Dolce, a UK food swapper, explained that when it's time to swap, you've got to move fast. "The first time I was forewarned that it would get a bit frantic. I thought: 'I'm a businessman, I can handle it.' I didn't know what was going on and I missed the choice stuff. Now I proactively go and grab something I like: you want that, I've got that, boom. The first five minutes are crucial."

The Guardian warns that food swapping isn't for everyone. Nicki Jones, at a UK food swap said, "This would be my mother's worst nightmare. She couldn't bear the thought of having anyone else's things."

== See also ==
- Gift economy
- Seed swap
- Transition town
