= Plant give-away =

Plant gifting or exchange

A plant give-away or plant swap is an event where members of the public receive or exchange plants free of charge. Plant give-aways are often hosted by local governments or organizations with a focus on the environment. Some events may focus on plants native to the region, edible plants, tree seedlings, or saplings. In addition to giving people free access to plants, these events may also aim to promote food security, build community, or boost the population of pollinating insects.

== See also ==
- Seed swap
- Give-away shop
