= Nancy Munn =

American anthropologist (1931–2020)

Nancy Dorothy Munn (April 13, 1931 – January 20, 2020) was an American anthropologist best known for her work in space and time, value, and world-making. Munn conducted fieldwork principally on the island of Gawa in Papua New Guinea, and amongst the Walbiri in Yuendumu, Australia.

She was awarded a Guggenheim Fellowship in 1992, and had her research with the Walbiri supported with a Fulbright.

== Early life ==
Munn grew up near 79th St. and Madison Avenue in Yorkville, a diverse neighbourhood in Manhattan's Upper East Side, attending Public School 6. Her mother worked as a fashion model in departmental stores. Munn's parents had divorced when Nancy was young, and her mother kept their Jewish identity hidden until Munn was in high school, having changed the family name from Schiffman to Munn.

== Academic career ==
Munn enrolled in the College of Letters at the University of Oklahoma, and after gaining her undergraduate degree went to Indiana University for a Masters degree in Anthropology. She received her PhD from Australian National University in 1961.

She began her teaching career in Vermont at Bennington College, and later taught the University of Massachusetts, Amherst. In 1972 while at Amherst, she joined the Institute for Advanced Study in Princeton, where she worked on material from the Massim region in the Trobriand Islands.

In 1976 she began an appointment at the University of Chicago, where she was the first woman in the anthropology department to be a tenured professor.

== Bibliography ==
- Munn, Nancy D. 1973. Walbiri Iconography: Graphic Representation and Cultural Symbolism in a Central Australian Society. Ithaca, NY: Cornell University Press.
- Munn, Nancy D. 1986. The Fame of Gawa: A Symbolic Study of Value Transformation in a Massim (Papua New Guinea) Society. Cambridge: Cambridge University Press.
