= Brownie points =

Imaginary social currency

Brownie points in modern usage are an imaginary social currency, which can be acquired by doing good deeds or earning favor in the eyes of another.

== Conjectures for etymology ==
=== Girl Guiding ===
A popular etymology is an allusion to the merit badges or six points earned by Brownies (junior Girl Guides/Girl Scouts) for performing good deeds. Brownies were named after a kind of mythological elf that does helpful things around the house.

=== Brown stamps ===
A popular marketing practice employed by many American stores, post-World War II, was the distribution of stamps with each purchase. The number of stamps given out varied with the value of the purchase. These stamps were collected by customers and later redeemed for household gifts. The earliest of these stamps were brown in color and known as "brown stamps" or "brown points". The relationship between a purchase and the collection of these "brown points" equated with doing a good thing (supporting the local vendor) and getting a bonus (the valuable stamps). Purportedly, the collection of these "brownie points" eventually evolved into the modern usage. The term Browniepoints is still used as a marketing practice in business by New Zealand power company Genesis Energy Limited. It was a gift service in New Zealand in the 2000–2010s.

=== George R. Brown ===
Another proposed etymology is that the term derives from the name of 19th-century American railroad superintendent George R. Brown who, in 1886, devised what was then an innovative system of merits and demerits for railroad employees on the Fall Brook Railway in New York state. Accounts of his system were published in railroad journals, and adopted by many leading US railroads. American railroad employees soon began referring colloquially to "brownie points", and at some point, the term entered the general vocabulary.

=== Curtis Publishing ===
In the 1930s, the Curtis Publishing Company published several magazines, including the Saturday Evening Post and the Ladies Home Journal. These magazines were distributed to subscribers through a delivery network that used youths, primarily boys, to sell subscriptions in residential neighborhoods. The boys received a small commission; in addition, if they met certain sales targets, they could also earn company scrip, consisting of green and brown vouchers, referred to as "greenies" and "brownies". One brownie was worth five greenies. The greenies and brownies could be redeemed for goods from the company's catalogue.

=== Scatological ===
The Oxford English Dictionary conjectures that this expression could also have derived from "brown noser", US military slang for a sycophant, while also mentioning the popular etymology that derives it from the awards system of the Brownies. The term "brownie", in the sense of "brown noser", was in use in the 1940s. It has been suggested that the term was given impetus through its coincidence with related scatological slang.

=== Earliest use ===
The second edition (1989) of the Oxford English Dictionary (OED) dates the phrase's published origin to 1963 (when it was reported in the journal American Speech), but the term is in fact somewhat older. The OED Online has two references from the mid-1940s. The earliest known appearance in newspapers dates to 1951, where a man in the Los Angeles Times speaks of earning favor with his wife in terms of brownie points.

== See also ==
- Barnstar
- Egoboo
- Gratitude trap
- Karma
- kudos
- Social Credit System
- Whuffie
