= Laura Bohannan =

American cultural anthropologist

- Born: Laura Marie Altman Smith; 1922
- Died: March 19, 2002 (aged 79–80)
- Other name: Elenore Smith Bowen
- Education: Oxford University
- Occupation: Cultural anthropologist
- Known for: Shakespeare in the Bush
- Spouse: Paul J. Bohannan

Laura Bohannan (née Laura Marie Altman Smith), (1922 – March 19, 2002) pen name Elenore Smith Bowen, was an American cultural anthropologist best known for her 1966 article, "Shakespeare in the Bush." Bohannan also wrote two books during the 1960s, Tiv Economy, with her husband, and Return to Laughter, a novel. These works were based on her travels and work in Africa between 1949 and 1953.

== Early life ==
Bohannan's undergraduate education was at the University of Arizona, where she met her husband Paul J. Bohannan. They married May 15, 1943. In 1951 Bohannan received her doctorate from Oxford University.

== Tiv ==
Off and on from 1949 to 1953 Bohannan and her husband lived among the Tiv tribe of central Nigeria. They would be the subject of her major works.

"Shakespeare in the Bush" is often anthologized because of its subject matter and unique perspective. Bohannan, while living in a small village in Nigeria, attempts to tell the story of Hamlet to a group of villagers. The cultural and language barriers between the two parties result in an entirely different telling of this most famous of English plays, with her audience left puzzling over Westerners' inability to understand their own literature. Thus, the essay is often used by students of anthropology, linguistics, and literary theory as a means of understanding how perspective affects perception and expectation.

Return to Laughter, which she wrote under the name Elenore Smith Bowen, remains a well-reviewed work, and it is based on Bohannan's fieldwork in Nigeria. Bohannan used a pseudonym for this book, presumably because she felt its popular tone and autobiographical format were inappropriate for her professional reputation. Bohannan's pseudonym was composed in part from her mother's first name, "Elenore", and her own maiden name "Smith". However, many reviews of Return to Laughter noted it as her work, and later editions were published without the pseudonym.

Other works written about the Tiv include Tiv Economy, for which Bohannan and her husband received the Herskovits Prize in 1969.

== Assessment and later life ==
Bohannan was also part of a small school of women whose studies in anthropology were initially rejected because of their holistic (and sometimes personal) approach and style. Other women in this school of early ethnographers include Zora Neale Hurston.

From 1970 to 1973 Bohannan was the editor of American Anthropologist. She and her husband divorced in 1975; they had one son, Denis. She served as the President of the African Studies Association from 1983-1984. She retired in 1990. On March 19, 2002, she died in her home of a heart attack.

== Selected publications ==
- Bohannan, Laura (1949) "Dahomean Marriage: A Revaluation" Africa: Journal of the International African Institute 19(4): pp. 273–287
- Bohannan, Laura (1952) "A Genealogical Charter" Africa: Journal of the International African Institute 22(4): pp. 301–315
- Bohannan, Laura (1966) "Shakespeare in the Bush. An American anthropologist set out to study the Tiv of West Africa and was taught the true meaning of Hamlet" Natural History 75: pp. 28–33
