= Commodity pathway diversion =

A commodity pathway diversion is the ability of an object to move in and out of the "commodity state" over the course of its use life. Diversions can occur when an object is removed from its commodity pathway for its protection and preservation, or when a previously removed object is commoditized through reentry into the commodity pathway after having gained value through its absence. Diversion is an integrated part of the commodity pathway.

== Commodity flows ==
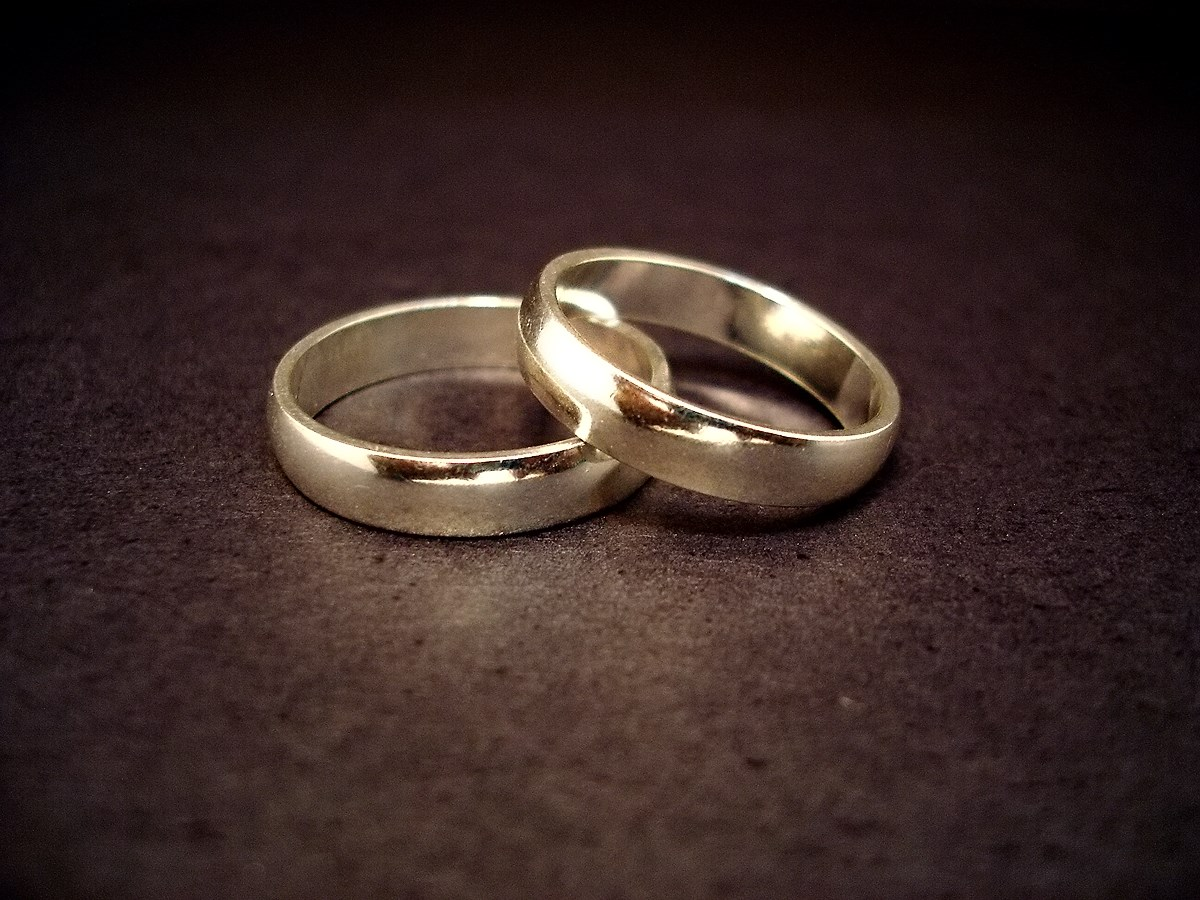
Wedding rings: commodity or pure gift?

Rather than emphasize how particular kinds of objects are either gifts or commodities to be traded in restricted spheres of exchange, Arjun Appadurai and others began to look at how objects flowed between these spheres of exchange. They refocussed attention away from the character of the human relationships formed through exchange, and placed it on "the social life of things" instead. They examined the strategies by which an object could be "singularized" (made unique, special, one-of-a-kind) and so withdrawn from the market. A marriage ceremony that transforms a purchased ring into an irreplaceable family heirloom is one example; the heirloom, in turn, makes a perfect gift. Singularization is the reverse of the seemingly irresistible process of commodification. They thus show how all economies are a constant flow of material objects that enter and leave specific exchange spheres. A similar approach is taken by Nicholas Thomas, who examines the same range of cultures and the anthropologists who write on them, and redirects attention to the "entangled objects" and their roles as both gifts and commodities. This emphasis on things has led to new explorations in "consumption studies."

Appadurai, drawing on the work of Igor Kopytoff suggests that "commodities, like persons, have social lives" and, to appropriately understand the human-ascribed value of a commodity, one must analyze "things-in-motion" (commodity pathways)—the entire life cycle of an object, including its form, use, and trajectory as a commodity. The reason for this kind of analysis, Appadurai suggests, is that a commodity is not a thing, rather it is one phase in the full life of the thing. According to anthropologist Arjun Appadurai, "the flow of commodities in any given situation is a shifting compromise between socially regulated paths and competitively inspired diversions."

At the heart of Appadurai's argument is the idea that commodities are "things in a certain situation." This idea requires that an object be analyzed from production, through exchange/distribution, to consumption to identify in which phase of its life an object is considered a commodity. Appadurai defines a commodity situation as "the situation in which [an object's] exchangeability for some other thing is a socially relevant feature."

== Theoretical origins ==
In his introduction to The Social Life of Things: Commodities in Cultural Perspective, Appadurai references the work of Nancy Munn and Igor Kopytoff as influential to the discussion of commodity pathways and diversions. Both scholars advocate analyzing the entire trajectory or "social life" of a commodity to understand its full value.

In her article The Spatiotemporal Transformations of Gawa Canoes, anthropologist Nancy Munn, argues that "to understand what is being created when Gawans make a canoe, we have to consider the total canoe fabrication cycle which begins…with the conversion of raw materials into a canoe, and continues in exchange with the conversion of the canoe into other objects." Here she helps lay the foundation of commodity pathway analysis. Similarly influential is Munn's study of the Australian Gawan Kula, in which she describes "strong paths." These are sequences of exchange relationships forged by Gawa men in order to circulate objects, namely shells. Because shells are imbued with value through the process of circulation, the forging of object pathways is necessary for Gawa men to control circulation and, in turn, shell value. According to Munn, "kula shells may arrive on path, or are obtained from partners or non-partners in off-path transactions and later put on a path or used to make new paths.", suggesting that diversion is an integral part of the commodity pathway because it is a means of "making new paths."

In The Cultural Biography of Things: Commoditization as a Process, Igor Kopytoff argues that, while commodities are often thought of in Marxian terms as things which are produced and then exist, in fact, "commoditization is best looked upon as a process of becoming rather than as an all-or-none state of being." He conceptualizes commoditization as a process which is both cultural and cognitive:

…commodities must be not only produced materially as things, but also culturally marked as being a certain kind of thing. Out of the total range of things available in a society, only some of them are considered appropriate for marking as commodities. Moreover, the same thing may be treated as a commodity at one time and not at another. And finally, the same thing may, at the same time, be seen as a commodity by one person and something else by another. Such shifts and differences in whether and when a thing is a commodity reveal a moral economy that stands behind the objective economy of visible transactions.

In his discussion of commoditization, he also presents the idea of singularization which occurs because "there are things that are publicly precluded from being commoditized…[and are] sometimes extended to things that are normally commodities—in effect, commodities are singularized by being pulled out of their commodity sphere." Kopytoff goes on to describe ways in which commodities can be singularized, for example, through restricted commoditization, sacralization, and terminal commoditization. While singularization and commodity pathway diversion have stark similarities, and Kopytoff's singularization categories can be seen in Appadurai's description of types of commodity pathway diversions, Appadurai critiques placing singularization and commoditization in direct opposition because, as he argues, diversion (singularization) and commoditization are fluidly occupied positions in the use life of an object.

== Enclaved commodities ==
Appadurai defines enclaved commodities as "objects whose commodity potential is carefully hedged." These objects are diverted from the commodity pathway to protect whatever value or symbolic power the object may transfer as a commodity. Appadurai suggests that in societies where "what is restricted and controlled is taste in an ever changing universe of commodities…diversion may sometimes involve the calculated "interested" removal of things from an enclaved zone to one where exchange is less confined and more profitable." Appadurai postulates that the diversion of commodities from commodity pathways, whether for aesthetic or economic reasons, is always a sign of either creativity or crisis. For example, individuals facing economic hardships may sell family heirlooms to commoditize and profit from previously enclaved items. Similarly, warfare often commoditizes previously enclaved items as sacred relics are plundered and entered into foreign markets.

=== Kingly things ===
"Kingly things" (term coined by Max Gluckman, 1983) are examples of institutionalized enclaved commodities that are diverted by royalty in order to "maintain sumptuary exclusivity, commercial advantage, and display of rank." Examples of this may be landed and movable property, or the "exclusive rights to things" that aid in the "evolution and materialization of social institutions and political relationships." According to Kopytoff, "kingly things" often make up the "symbolic inventory of a society: public lands, monuments, state art collections, the paraphernalia of political power, royal residences, chiefly insignia, ritual objects, and so on." Some African chiefs, for example, have been known to claim rights over tangible animal and human body parts such as teeth, bones, skulls, pelts, and feathers, which are believed to connect humans to their ancestral origins. Anthropologist Mary Helms argues that by controlling "kingly things" chiefs control access to ancestors and origins, ultimately legitimizing whatever power this cosmological access affords them.

=== Sacred things ===
Appadurai argues that sacred things are "terminal commodities" because they are diverted from their commodity pathways after their production. Diversion in this case is based on a society's understanding of an object's cosmological biography and sacred or ritual value.

Ritual Objects are often diverted from their commodity pathway after a long exchange and use life which constitutes its production. According to Katherine A. Spielmann, a ritual object's value accumulates through space and time. A ritual object is not produced as an immediately finished product, rather it is produced as it accumulates history and becomes physically modified and elaborated through circulation. This, she explains, is evidenced by the archaeological record. In Melanesia, for example, the largest, thinnest, most obviously elaborated axes are used as ceremonial items. Similarly, in the Southwest, the most highly polished and elaborated glaze ware vessels are important ritual objects.

== Commodity pathway diversion in art ==
According to Appadurai, "the best examples of the diversion of commodities from their original nexus is to be found in the domain of fashion, domestic display, and collecting in the modern West." In these domains, tastes, markets, and ideologies play a significant role commodity pathway diversion.

The value of tourist Art—objects produced in small-scale societies for ceremonial, sumptuary, or aesthetic use which are diverted through commoditization— is predicated on the tastes and markets of larger economies. Though not produced in a small-scale society, current tastes and market demands (2010) for Chinese jade artwork has caused previously enclaved objects – once belonging to royalty – with aesthetic and sumptuary value, to be commoditized by European collectors and auctioneers(4/28/2010).

There is also the possibility of commoditization by diversion, "where value in the art or fashion market, is accelerated or enhanced by placing objects and things in unlikely contexts" or by framing and aestheticizing an everyday commodity as art.

Artistic movements such as Bauhaus and Dada, and artists like Andy Warhol — reacting against consumerism and commoditization — have, by taking critical aim at prevailing tastes, markets, and ideologies, commoditized mundane objects by diverting them from their commodity pathways. Dada artist Marcel Duchamp's now famous work "Fountain" was meant to be understood as a rejection of art and a questioning of value (1968). By diverting a urinal from its commodity pathway and exhibiting it as art in a museum, Duchamp created an enclaved item out of a commodity, thus increasing its social value, and commoditized mundane items by affecting artistic tastes.

Artist William Morris argued that "under industrial capitalism artificial needs and superficial ideas about luxury are imposed on the consumer from without and …as a result, art becomes a commodity" (1985:8-9). Bauhaus artists like Morris and Walter Gropius understood commodities in purely Marxian terms as things which are immediately produced, having inherent market value. They reacted against this perceived commoditization of art by producing what they considered decommodified art. However, as Kopytoff argued, "commodities must be not only produced materially as things, but also culturally marked as being a certain kind of thing." Thus, when diverting industrial materials from their commodity pathways to produce art became culturally valuable, the objects themselves gained value (1985).

Finally, pop artist Andy Warhol, created artwork couched in what Appadurai refers to as the "aesthetics of decontextualization." In his famous Campbell's Soup painting, Warhol diverts advertising from its commodity pathway by reproducing it as a work of art. By placing this Campbell's soup advertisement in a museum, Warhol enhances the value of the advertisement by making the image iconic.

== Bibliography ==
Appadurai, Arjun

1986 Introduction: Commodities and the Politics of Value. In The Social Life of Things: Commodities in Cultural Perspective, edited by A. Appadurai, pp. 3–63. Cambridge University Press, Cambridge, UK.

Jennifer Dyer

2004 The Metaphysics of the Mundane: Understanding Andy Warhol's Serial Imagery. Artibus et Historiae 25(49):33–47

Earle, Timothy

2000 Archaeology, Property, and Prehistory. Annual Review of Anthropology 29:39–60

Helms, Mary W.

1998 Tangible Durability. In Access to Origins: Affines, Ancestors, and Aristocrats, by M. W. Helms, pp. 164–173. University of Texas Press, Austin.

Kopytoff, Igor

1986 The Cultural Biography of Things: Commoditization as a Process. In The Social Life of Things: Commodities in Cultural Perspective, edited by A. Appadurai, pp. 64–91. Cambridge University Press, Cambridge, UK

Kristiansen, Donna M.

1968 What Is Dada? Educational Theatre Journal. 20(3):457–462

Munn, Nancy

1977 The Spatiotemporal Transformation of Gawa Canoes. In Journal de la Société des Océanistes 33(54/55):39–53

Munn, Nancy

1983 Gawa Kula: Spatiotemporal Control and the Symbolism of Influence. In J.W Leach and E. Leach eds., The Kula: New Perspectives on Massim Exchange, 277–308 Cambridge, Cambridge University Press.

Spielmann, Katherine A.

2002 Feasting, Craft Specialization, and the Ritual Mode of Production in Small‐Scale Societies. American Anthropologist104:195–207.

Weingarden, Lauren S.

1985 Aesthetics Politicized: William Morris to the Bauhaus. Journal of Architectural Education38(3):8–13
