= Seed swap =

Event where gardeners meet to exchange seeds

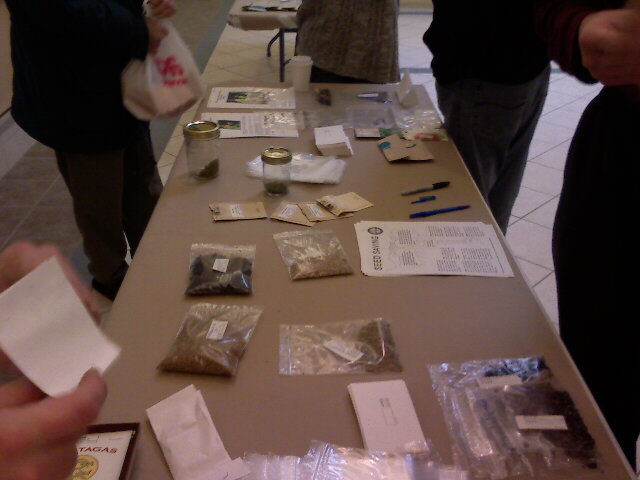
A seed swap in Urbana, Illinois

Seed swaps are events where gardeners meet to exchange seeds. Swapping can be arranged online or by mail, especially when participants are spread out geographically. Swap meet events, where growers meet and exchange their excess seeds in person, are also growing in popularity. In part this is due to increased interest in organic gardening and heritage or heirloom plant varietals. This reflects gardeners' interest in "unusual or particular varieties of flowers and vegetables", according to Kathy Jentz of Washington Gardener Magazine (Maryland).

Seed swaps also help consumers who, due to increases in the cost of living or an interest in cutting down on expenditures, wish to grow their own food. Native plant seed swaps allow gardeners with an interest in natural landscaping or wildlife gardening to find locally grown seeds native to their ecoregion which may not be available from plant nurseries. Some events are organized as part of an educational effort, where visitors are taught gardening and growing skills and how to preserve an area's cultural heritage and biodiversity. In the United States, the last Saturday of January is "National Seed Swap Day".

== Cultural and culinary significance ==
Swapping seeds is of great cultural significance for many of the people involved, because it allows a culture which has become widely distributed, such as Hispanic and Latino Americans in the United States, to continue to grow the food they are accustomed to, foods which often have great significance, and for which seeds are often transported over great distances. Mike Szuberla, organizer of a seed swap in Toledo, Ohio, noted, "Seeds are, in a sense, suitcases in which people can transport their cultures with them... Many families have brought their favorite seeds on tremendous journeys."

In some cases seed swaps are annual events and function as community celebrations (comparable to potlucks), such as the annual seed swap (in its eleventh year in 2008) on the Oglethorpe farm near Athens, Georgia, organized by two anthropology professors from the University of Georgia (the university has a seedbank, the "Southern Seed Legacy"). Participants share seeds of heirloom fruits and vegetables grown in their families or communities for generations; for some, the goal of such swaps is to preserve a "dying" heritage. A similar goal is stated for a seed swap in Devon, England, where the North Devon Seed Swap has been held since 1 February 2004.

The Dixon Community Seed Exchange, in Dixon, New Mexico, has been taking place annually since 2003. It distributes free seeds of homegrown and commercial varieties as available and also provides a forum for the exchange of varieties peculiar to the high mountain areas of northern New Mexico. It attracts several hundred participants and photos may be viewed at its website.

A distinct and less public kind of seed swap involves the seeds of marijuana.

== Biological significance ==
Some seed swaps explicitly have a biological goal—usually either educating the public in organic gardening or the attempt to maintain crop diversity. The larger global relevance and beneficial long-range effects of ecological farming sustained by seed swaps, and the effects of such practices in countering the effects of agrichemical monoculture, are beginning to be studied.

== Restrictions in the European Union ==
The European Court of Justice ruled in 2012 that farmers in the European Union are allowed under restricted circumstances to both produce and market seeds from plant varieties that are not officially registered and approved. Sale of such seeds could not be categorically prohibited on the basis of an existing EU guideline on seed registering. The corporation Graines Baumax had taken the domestic farmers' network Kokopelli to court and demanded €50,000 (US$61,000). Kokopelli won this case.

France has the most strict implementation of the seed laws. Indications in 2011 is that even more restrictions are on their way. The European Parliament rejected the European Commission's proposal for plant reproductive material law, also known as the "seed regulation" in 2014.

== See also ==
- Community gardening
- Crop diversity
- Food swap
- Gift economy
- Organic gardening
- Plant give-away
- Seedbank
- Seed library
- Seed saving
