= Paul Bohannan =

American africanist and social anthropologist (1920–2007)

- Born: March 5, 1920; Lincoln, Nebraska
- Died: July 13, 2007 (aged 87); Visalia, California
- Education: University of Arizona; Queen's College, Oxford
- Known for: Ethnography of the Tiv; Spheres of exchange; Divorce in the United States
- Awards: Legion of Merit (1944); Herskovitz Prize (1969)
- Scientific career
- Fields: Cultural anthropology
- Workplaces: Oxford University; Princeton University; Northwestern University; University of California, Santa Barbara; University of Southern California; Nigeria

Paul James Bohannan (March 5, 1920 – July 13, 2007) was an American anthropologist known for his research on the Tiv people of Nigeria, spheres of exchange and divorce in the United States.

== Early life and education ==
Bohannan was born in Lincoln, Nebraska, to Hillory Bohannan and Hazel Truex Bohannan. During the Dust Bowl his family moved to Benson, Arizona. World War II interrupted his college education, and he served in the U.S. Army Quartermaster Corps from 1941 to 1945 reaching the rank of captain. In 1947 he graduated Phi Beta Kappa with his bachelor's degree in German from the University of Arizona. He attended Queen's College, Oxford, thereafter as a Rhodes scholar, receiving a Bachelor of Science in 1949 and his doctor of philosophy degree in 1951, both in anthropology.

== Academic career ==
Bohannan remained in England and was a lecturer in social anthropology at Oxford University until 1956 when he returned to the United States taking up an assistant professorship in anthropology at Princeton University. In 1959, Bohannan left Princeton for a full professorship at Northwestern University in Evanston, Illinois. From 1975 to 1982 he taught at the University of California, Santa Barbara. In 1982 he became dean of the social science and communications department at the University of Southern California (U.S.C.). He retired from full-time teaching in 1987, but remained at U.S.C. as professor emeritus until his death.

From 1962 to 1964 Bohannan was a director on the Social Science Research Council. He was a director of American Ethnological Society from 1963 to 1966. Bohannan was president of the African Studies Association in 1964. He was elected to the American Philosophical Society in 1970. In 1979–1980, he was president of the American Anthropological Association.

== Personal life ==
Bohannan married Laura Marie Smith, an anthropologist with whom he collaborated on Tiv Economy, on 15 May 1943. They had one son, Denis, and were divorced in 1975. He remained married to his second wife, Adelyse D'Arcy, from 1981 until his death. Bohannan died on 13 July 2007, in Visalia, California. He was a connoisseur of Scotch whisky and a ballet enthusiast.

== Awards ==
- 1944 Legion of Merit.
- 1969 Herskovitz Prize for Tiv Economy, shared with his wife Laura Bohannan.

== Selected bibliography ==
- Justice and Judgment among the Tiv. Oxford: Oxford University Press. 1957. OCLC 67530323.
- Social Anthropology. New York: Holt, Rinehart and Winston. 1963. OCLC 230074.
- Africa and Africans. Garden City, NY: Natural History Press. 1964. OCLC 413202. (Fourth Edition [with Philip Curtin] published Long Grove, IL: Waveland Press, 1995)
- With Bohannan, Laura (1968). Tiv Economy. Evanston, IL: Northwestern University Press. OCLC 7394758.
- With Bernard, Jessie (1970). Divorce and After. Garden City, NY: Doubleday. OCLC 87758.
- We, the Alien: An introduction to cultural anthropology. Long Grove, IL: Waveland Press. 1991. ISBN 978-0-88133-637-5.
- How Culture Works. New York: Free Press. 1995. ISBN 978-0-02-904505-3.
- With van der Elst, Dirk (1998). Asking and Listening: Ethnography as Personal Adaptation. Long Grove, IL: Waveland Press. ISBN 978-0-88133-987-1.
