= Richard Salisbury =

Richard Salisbury may refer to:

- Richard Anthony Salisbury, British botanist
- Richard Frank Salisbury, Canadian anthropologist
