= Embeddedness =

Economic concept

In economics and economic sociology, embeddedness refers to the degree to which economic activity is constrained by non-economic institutions. The term was created by economic historian Karl Polanyi as part of his substantivist approach. Polanyi argued that in non-market societies there are no pure economic institutions to which formal economic models can be applied. In these cases economic activities such as "provisioning" are "embedded" in non-economic kinship, religious and political institutions. In market societies, in contrast, economic activities have been rationalized, and economic action is "disembedded" from society and able to follow its own distinctive logic, captured in economic modeling. Polanyi's ideas were widely adopted and discussed in anthropology in what has been called the formalist–substantivist debate. Subsequently, the term "embeddedness" was further developed by economic sociologist Mark Granovetter, who argued that even in market societies, economic activity is not as disembedded from society as economic models would suggest.

== Karl Polanyi ==
According to Polanyi, in non-capitalist, pre-industrial economies livelihoods are not based on market exchange but on redistribution and reciprocity. Reciprocity is defined as the mutual exchange of goods or services as part of long-term relationships. Redistribution implies the existence of a strong political centre such as kinship-based leadership, which receives and then redistributes subsistence goods according to culturally specific principles. Economic decision-making in such places is not so much based on individual choice, but rather on social relationships, cultural values, moral concerns, politics, religion or the fear instilled by authoritarian leadership. Production in most peasant and tribal societies is for the producers, also called 'production for use' or subsistence production, as opposed to 'production for exchange' which has profit maximisation as its chief aim.

This difference in types of economy is explained by the 'embeddedness' of economic (i.e. provisioning) activities in other social institutions such as kinship in non-market economies. Rather than being a separate and distinct sphere, the economy is embedded in both economic and non-economic institutions. Exchange takes place within and is regulated by society rather than being located in a social vacuum. For example, religion and government can be just as important to economics as economic institutions themselves. Socio-cultural obligations, norms and values play a significant role in people's livelihood strategies. Consequently, any analysis of economics as an analytically distinct entity isolated from its socio-cultural and political context is flawed from the outset. A substantivist analysis of economics will therefore focus on the study of the various social institutions on which people's livelihoods are based. The market is only one amongst many institutions that determine the nature of economic transactions. Polanyi's central argument is that institutions are the primary organisers of economic processes. The substantive economy is an "instituted process of interaction between man and his environment, which results in a continuous supply of want satisfying material means."

== Mark Granovetter ==
Economic Sociologist Mark Granovetter provided a new research paradigm (neo-substantivism) for these researchers. Granovetter argued that the neoclassical view of economic action which separated economics from society and culture promoted an 'undersocialized account' that atomises human behavior. Similarly, he argued, substantivists had an "over-socialized" view of economic actors, refusing to see the ways that rational choice could influence the ways they acted in traditional, "embedded" social roles.

Actors do not behave or decide as atoms outside a social context, nor do they adhere slavishly to a script written for them by the particular intersection of social categories that they happen to occupy. Their attempts at purposive action are instead embedded in concrete, ongoing systems of social relations. (Granovetter 1985:487)

Granovetter applied the concept of embeddedness to market societies, demonstrating that even there, "rational" economic exchanges are influenced by pre-existing social ties. In his study of ethnic Chinese business networks in Indonesia, Granovetter found individuals' economic agency embedded in networks of strong personal relations. In processes of clientelization the cultivation of personal relationships between traders and customers assumes an equal or higher importance than the economic transactions involved. Economic exchanges are not carried out between strangers but rather by individuals involved in long-term continuing relationships.

== See also ==
- Economic sociology
- Cultural economics
- Economic anthropology
- Political economy
- Embedded democracy – Form of government
- Embedded liberalism – Global economic system, 1945 to 1970s
- Embedded journalism – Practice of attaching journalists to military units
- Embedded feminism – Concept in feminism
