= Harold K. Schneider =

American economic anthropologist

Harold K. "Hal" Schneider (1925 – May 2, 1987) was an American seminal figure in economic anthropology. Born in Aberdeen, South Dakota, he attended elementary and secondary school in St. Paul, Minnesota, and did his undergraduate work at Macalester College and Seabury-Western Theological Seminary, receiving a bachelor's degree in sociology, with a minor in biology, from Macalester in 1949. He then went to Northwestern University, where he was a student of Melville Herskovits, basing his dissertation on field research among the Pokot of Kenya.

Upon receiving his Ph.D. in anthropology in 1953, he moved to Lawrence University, where he eventually became chairman of the anthropology department. In 1970 he moved to Indiana University, where remained until he died in 1987.

== Formalist–substantivist debate ==
Schneider focused on East Africa in his field work, and was especially influenced by his study of the Turu in Tanzania. His mentor, Melville Herskovits, had also focused on East African pastoral peoples, and in this, as well as in Schneider's continued interest in morality and aesthetics, the pupil followed the teacher.

Active in creating the nascent field of economic anthropology, he was the first president of the Society for Economic Anthropology, serving from 1980 until 1982. His focus on economic anthropology is first evident in his dissertation, on the ways in which cattle were used by a pastoral people in East Africa. His early contribution was as an articulate advocate for the formalist perspective in economic anthropology. Schneider thought it useful to view human behavior as optimizing behavior, in the tradition of neoclassical economics, and thought that this optimizing behavior manifested itself even among peoples without money or markets. Schneider was compelled to argue forcefully against the prevailing substantivist perspective, which held that optimizing behavior was characteristic only of societies with markets. The debate took place in academic journals and conferences, and "peaked with the publication of Marshall Sahlins' Stone Age Economics (1972) and Schneider's Economic Man (1974)". The debate was fundamentally about the relationship between academic economics and academic anthropology, with formalists eager to use the methods of economics and substantivists equally determined to keep economics out of anthropology. By the late 1970s the debate had died down.

== Human Relations Area Files ==
Schneider was also interested in using information technology to store and analyze ethnographic information. He served on the executive committee of the Human Relations Area Files between 1981 and 1984, at a time when the organization began moving its data into electronic format. As Edgar Wimans notes, the influence of George Peter Murdock can be seen in Schneider's work, not only in his interest in ethnographic databases (a movement which Murdock pioneered), but in the way in which he developed general causal hypotheses explaining features of social structure. This facet of Schneider's thought is best exemplified in his 1979 Livestock and Equality in East Africa: The Economic Basis for Social Structure, where he maintains that a pastoral society's kinship system and its degree of egalitarianism are conditioned by the number of livestock per person.

== Selected work ==
- 1953 The Pakot (Suk) of Kenya, with Special Reference to the Role of Livestock in Their Subsistence Economy. PhD Dissertation, Northwestern University.
- 1957 "The Subsistence Role of Cattle Among the Pakot and in East Africa." American Anthropologist. 59:278-300.
- 1964 "A Model of African Indigenous Economy and Society." Comparative Studies in Society and History. VII:35-55.
- 1968 (ed., with Edward E. LeClair Jr.) Economic Anthropology: Readings in Theory and Analysis. New York: Holt, Rinehart and Winston.
- 1970 The Wahi Wanyaturu: Economics in an African Society. Chicago: Aldine.
- 1974 Economic Man. New York: Free Press.
- 1974 "Economic Development and Economic Change: The Case of East African Cattle." Current Anthropology. 15:259-265.
- 1975 "Economic Development and Anthropology." Annual Review of Anthropology. 4:271-292.
- 1979 Livestock and Equality in East Africa: The Economic Bases for Social Structure. Bloomington: Indiana University Press.
- 1981 The Africans. Englewood Cliffs, NJ: Prentice-Hall.
- 1981 "Livestock as Food and Money." in The Future of Pastoral Peoples. J. G. Galaty et al., eds. pp. 210–223. Ottawa: International Development Research Center.
- 1981 "The Pastoralist Development Problem." Journal of Asian and African Studies. XV(1 & 2).
