= Richard Frank Salisbury =

Canadian anthropologist (1926–1989)

FRSC Richard Frank Salisbury
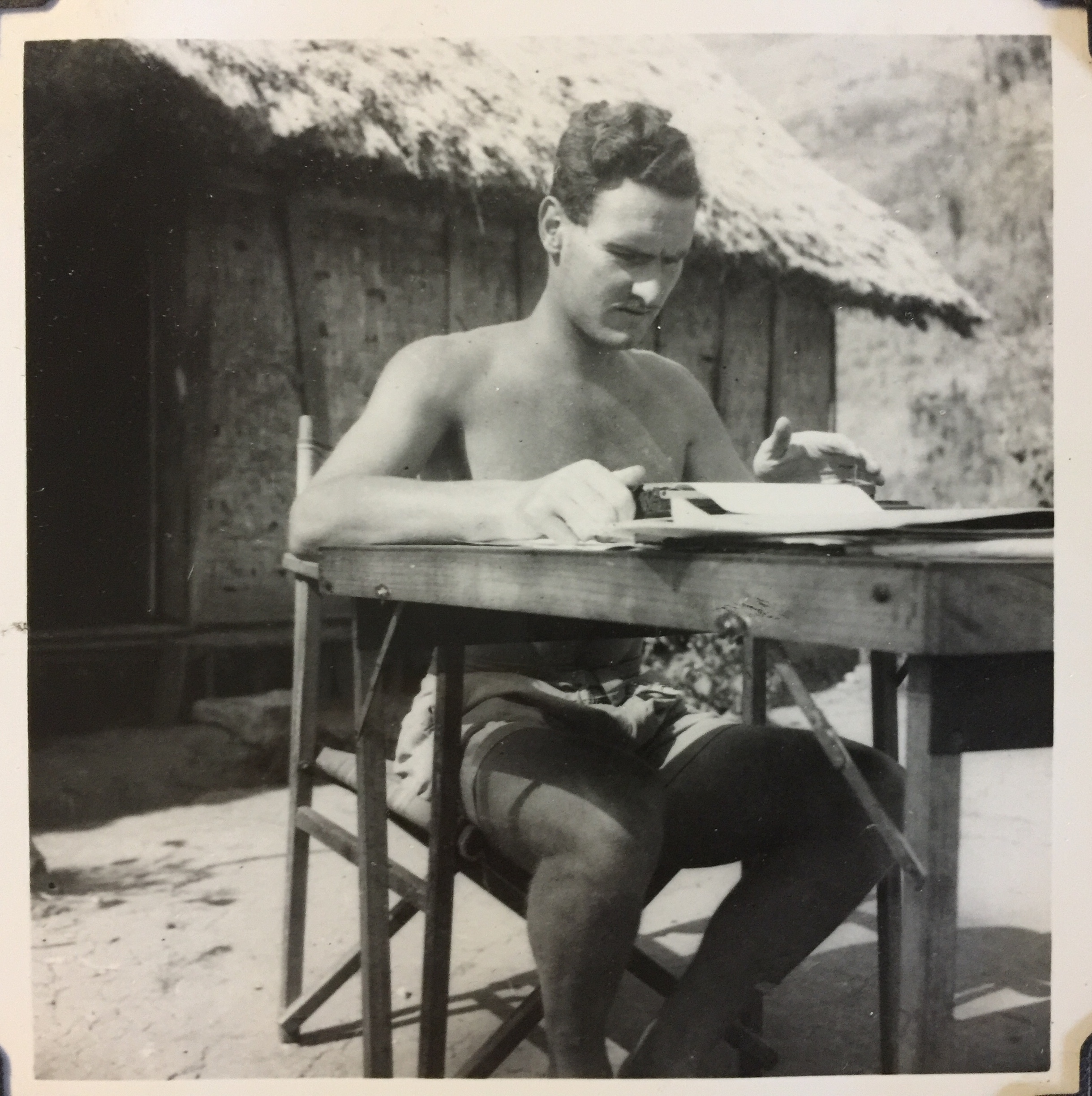
- Born: December 8, 1926; London England
- Died: June 17, 1989 (aged 62); Montreal, Quebec
- Education: St John's College, Cambridge; Harvard University; Australian National University
- Occupation: Anthropologist
- Spouse: Mary Elizabeth Roseborough (1954)
- Children: Thomas S., John W., Catherine E.
- Awards: Killam Foundation Research Fellowship, 1980-1982

Richard Frank Salisbury FRSC (December 8, 1926 – June 17, 1989), also known as Dick Salisbury, was a Canadian anthropologist, specializing in the field of economic anthropology and anthropology of development. His primary fieldwork and subsequent publications dealt with the Tolai and Siane people of Papua New Guinea and the Cree of Northern Quebec.

Salisbury was the founder of the McGill University Department of Anthropology, serving as its first chair (1966–1970). He was the co-founder of McGill University's Centre for Developing Areas Studies. He was the director of the Programme in the Anthropology of Development at McGill from 1970 – 1986 and finally Dean of the Faculty of Arts at McGill from 1986 to 1989.

A prolific writer, he authored or co-authored some 20 books, monographs and reports, more than 60 articles and numerous other reviews and commentaries. His most notable books are From Stone to Steel (1962), Vunamami (1970), and A Homeland for the Cree (1986).

Salisbury's influence was felt not only through his academic writings – he produced many high-impact research and policy reports on critical social issues of the day. He regularly engaged these issues as an anthropological consultant and public policy voice. His leadership on the impact study of the James Bay Project, a hydro-electric mega-complex, helped the James Bay Cree and the Government of Quebec work out the historic James Bay and Northern Quebec Agreement (1975). The Agreement was the first treaty (a 'comprehensive claims settlement' in the language of the 1970s) to be signed with an Indigenous people in Canada since the 1920s. It became a model for subsequent modern treaties, seeking terms for reconciling Indigenous autonomy, economic justice and cultural aspirations with the jurisdictional claims and development plans of provincial and federal governments.

== Biography ==
Salisbury, the second of three children, was born in London, England (Chelsea). His parents were Thomas Salisbury and Marjorie Beatrice (Smith) Salisbury. He served with the Royal Marines from 1945 to 1948 and simultaneously attended St John's College, Cambridge, in Cambridge, England, earning a Bachelor of Arts degree in 1949, specializing in Modern Languages.

In 1949, with a scholarship, he travelled to the United States and pursued his graduate work in the field of anthropology at Harvard University. He earned MA degrees from both Harvard University (1955) and University of Cambridge (1956). He studied anthropology at Cambridge with Meyer Fortes. He earned a PhD from Australian National University (1957), where he studied under Siegfried Frederick Nadel's supervision.

At Harvard University, he met Mary Roseborough, a Canadian who was doing her PhD in Sociology at Radcliffe College and was an assistant professor in Sociology at Tufts University. In 1954, they married in Toronto, Canada at the Walmer Road Baptist Church. Between 1957 and 1963, he and Mary had three children – Thomas, John and Catherine.

Salisbury died of renal cancer on June 17, 1989, and is buried at Mount Royal Cemetery, Montreal, Quebec. He died at age 62.

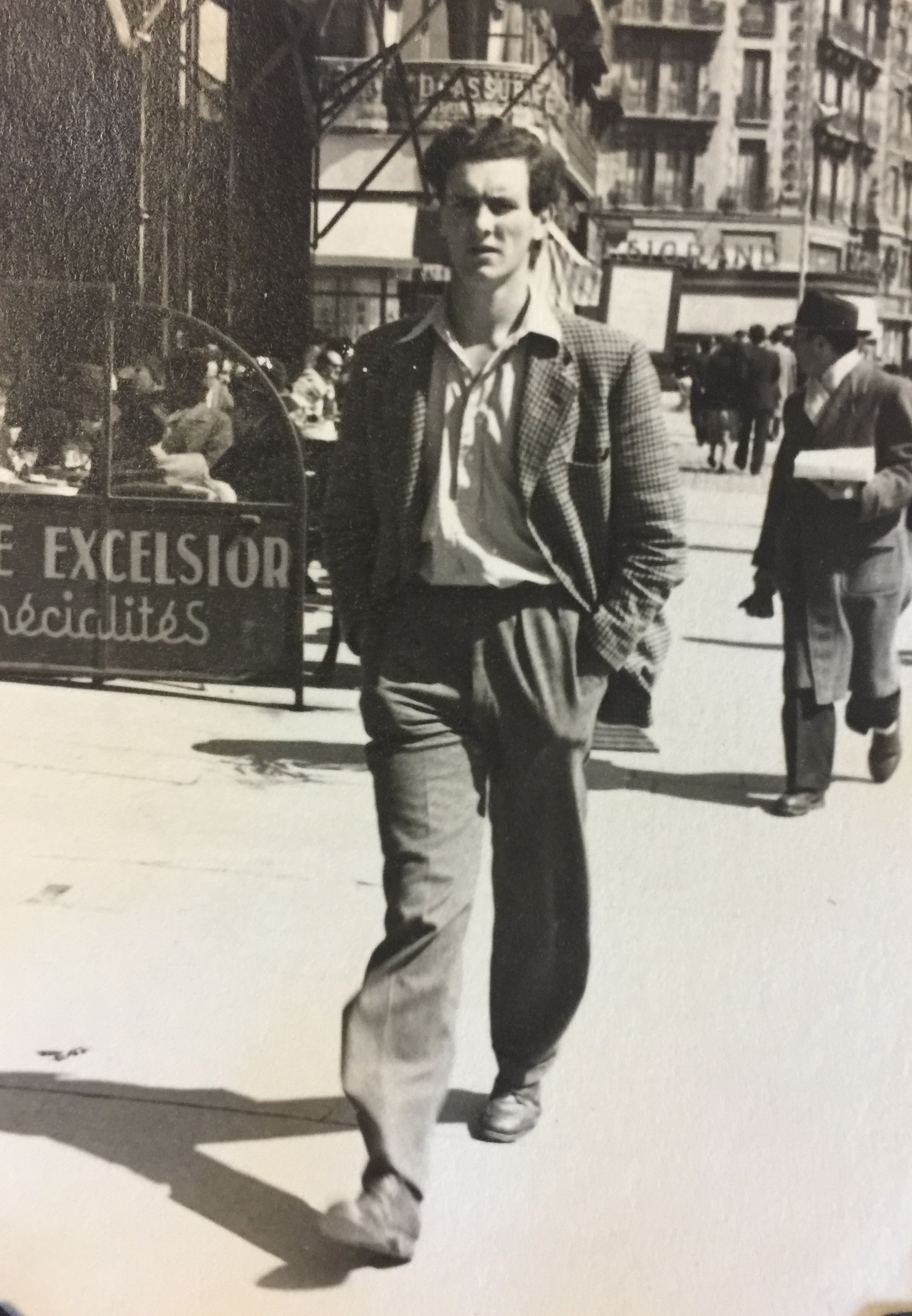
Richard Frank Salisbury in Paris, 1940s

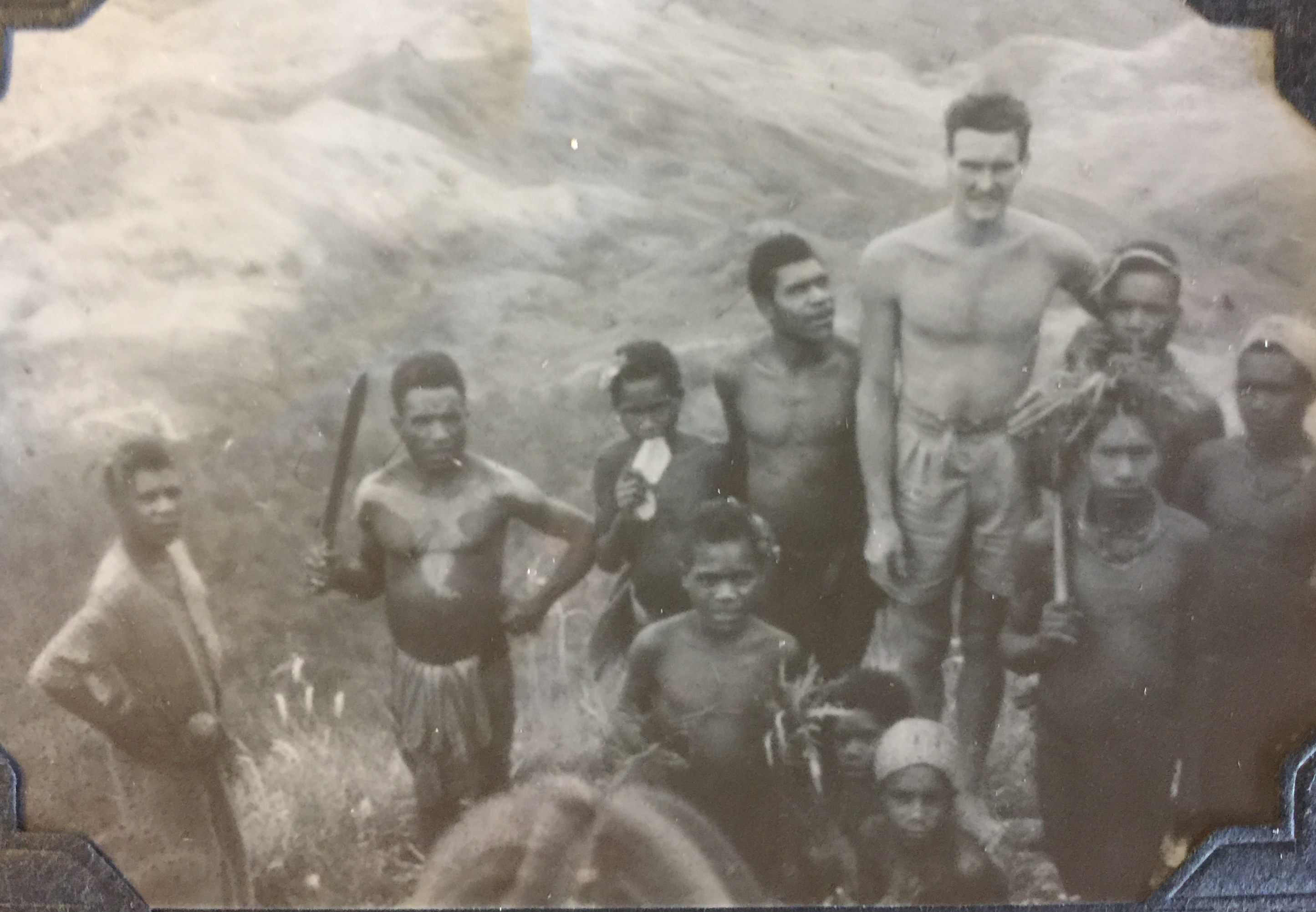
Richard Frank Salisbury with Siane People of Papua New Guinea, 1950s

== Career ==
Salisbury held a research position at the Harvard School of Public Health 1954–56, was an assistant professor at Tufts University, Boston, 1956–57 and an assistant professor at University of California at Berkeley, 1957–62.

In 1962, Salisbury moved to Montreal and joined the Department of Anthropology and Sociology at McGill University, where he stayed until the end of his career.

Salisbury was the founder of the McGill University Department of Anthropology, serving as its first chair (1966–1970). He was the co-founder of McGill University's Centre for Developing Areas Studies. He was the director of the Programme in the Anthropology of Development at McGill University from 1970 to 1986. Salisbury served as McGill University's Dean of The Faculty of Arts (1986-1989) until his death.

He was a visiting professor at the University of Papua New Guinea in 1967 and 1984.

He was president of six anthropology associations including the Canadian Sociology and Anthropology Association (1968–1970), the Northeastern Anthropology Association (1968), the American Ethnological Society (1980), the Society for Economic Anthropology (1982), and the Society for Applied Anthropology in Canada (1986). He was a member of the Royal Anthropological Institute, the American Anthropological Association, and was a co-founder of the Canadian Ethnology Society, which became the Canadian Anthropology Society/Société Canadienne d’Anthropologie.

He was a member of the Social Science Research Council of Canada, 1969–1972; the Academic Advisory Panel of the Canada Council, 1974–1978; a member of the 1977 Quebec Commission on Higher Education, 1977–1979; served on the board of the Quebec Institute for Research on Culture, 1979–1984, and served on the board of the Canadian Human Rights Foundation from 1980.

He was a member of the editorial Advisory Boards of five international and Canadian scientific journals.

Salisbury was a consultant to the Administrator of Papua, 1971; the Canadian Department of Agriculture, 1970; the James Bay Development Corporation, 1971–1972; the Indians of Quebec Association, 1972–1975; Communications Canada, 1974–1975; the James Bay Energy Corporation, 1982; and Garbe, Lahmeyer & Co., 1984.

He was elected to the Royal Society of Canada in 1974 and became Honorary Secretary of the Royal Society of Canada Academy of Humanities and Social Sciences.

== Academic work ==
Salisbury was best known for his work in economic anthropology and the anthropology of development, to which he developed a transactional approach that emphasized the interactions of social actors and decision-makers within, and with, societal institutions and structures. His holistic approach to human action extended to contributions in domains of kinship and social structure, language, transcultural psychiatry and religion. These perspectives and contributions are richly apparent in his work on economic change among the Siane people of the Papuan New Guinea Highlands – he was the first anthropologist to live with the Siane (1952-1953) – and on development in a Tolai village of New Britain, Papua New Guinea.

Salisbury combined thorough fieldwork and rigorous analysis with a commitment to social action. He held that theory and practice, in dialogue, enrich one another. Salisbury thought researchers could play important roles as honest brokers and ombudspersons. High quality research and analysis should be equitably accessible to all parties, helping to reduce power inequalities, informing disputants of one another's perspectives, and enabling them to get beyond ‘zero-sum’ positions to negotiate intersecting interests and a common good. This perspective informed his work on social change among the Cree people of Northern Quebec. The James Bay Project threatened to disrupt the hunting way of life of the Cree through widescale environmental damage and displacement, and to undermine Cree rights. Salisbury's social impact studies, for a Federal-Provincial Task Force, were evidence of these impending harms. The research reports on which his 1986 book A Homeland for the Cree is based were used by the Cree in their negotiations with the Quebec government.

== Selected publications ==
- From Stone to Steel: Economic Consequences of a Technological Change in New Guinea (1962)
- Structures of Custodial Care : An Anthropological Study of a State Mental Hospital (1962)
- Vunamami: Economic Transformation in a Traditional Society (1970) ISBN 9780520302983
- A Homeland for the Cree: Regional Development in James Bay, 1971-1981 (1986) ISBN 9780773505513
- Ethnography and Development: The Work of F. Salisbury, Marilyn Silverman, Richard F. Salisbury, Harvey A. Feit, Henry J. Rutz and Colin H. Scott. ISBN 9780773529502

== Legacy ==
The Canadian Anthropology Society awards The Richard F. Salisbury Student Award annually to a PhD anthropology candidate, enrolled at a Canadian university, for the purposes of defraying expenses incurred while carrying out dissertation fieldwork. The winner of each award is also invited to present their preliminary findings to the annual meeting of the Canadian Anthropology Society/Société Canadienne d’Anthropologie.

McGill University's Richard F Salisbury Prize in Anthropology – In memory of Dean Salisbury, founder of the McGill Department of Anthropology. Awarded annually by the McGill Faculty of Arts Scholarships Committee on the recommendation of the Department of Anthropology to a graduating or continuing Anthropology student who presents the best honours thesis or another research paper of comparable magnitude.

The Richard F. Salisbury Memorial Lecture was established in 2019.

The Redpath Museum at McGill University has a permanent display of items from the Richard Salisbury Collection. The collection is of artifacts that Salisbury collected during his fieldwork in Papua New Guinea Highlands and in New Britain.
