= Jon Charles Altman =

Australian anthropologist and economist

Professor Jon Charles Altman AM (born 8 September 1954) is a social scientist with a disciplinary focus on anthropology and economics. He is an emeritus professor of the Australian National University currently affiliated to the Regulatory Institutions Network (RegNet), College of Asia and the Pacific, ANU. He was the founding director of the Centre for Aboriginal Economic Policy Research (CAEPR) at the Australian National University (1990 to 2010) and then a research professor there until 2014 when he retired. He is a Fellow of the Academy of the Social Sciences in Australia and an Honorary Fellow of the Royal Society of New Zealand. From 2008 to 2013 he was an Australian Research Council Australian Professorial Fellow. In late 2015 Altman moved to Melbourne to take up an appointment from 1 February 2016 as research professor at the Alfred Deakin Institute for Citizenship and Globalization at Deakin University.

== Early life ==
Altman was born in Haifa, Israel and attended school in New Zealand. In 1973 he completed a BA in Economics and Philosophy at the University of Auckland and went on to complete a MA (Hons) in Economics. Altman relocated to Australia in 1976.

== Career ==
In his early career Altman sought to examine Indigenous disadvantage from an economic rather than the then dominant social welfare perspective and to place Indigenous economic development issues in a comparative international context.

Between 1978 and 1982 Altman completed a PhD in anthropology at the Australian National University. He used ethnographic methods and comparative analysis from the field of economic anthropology to examine Aboriginal ways of living at remote outstations on Aboriginal-owned land. He undertook fieldwork amongst the Kuninjku people in Western Arnhem Land.

Throughout the 1980s he undertook a series of research projects about Indigenous engagement with new industries including mining, tourism, and the visual arts. He collaborated with Chris Gregory, an anthropologist at the Australian National University, to theorise and document this methodology.

In 1990, Altman established the Centre for Aboriginal Economic Policy Research (CAEPR) at the Australian National University as a multidisciplinary centre to enhance Australia's capacity to undertake social sciences research about the economic situation of Indigenous people. He was director of the centre from 1990 to 2010. Since 2001, he has focused his research on the hybrid economy framework and theory that encompasses the intercultural nature of Aboriginal livelihood approaches particularly in remote regions, the articulations between customary, market and state sectors of remote Aboriginal economies.

Since 2006, Altman shifted his intellectual focus to political ecology and critical development studies. He has been an outspoken critic of policies of the Australian government in Indigenous affairs, labelling them "neoliberal assimilation" and "neo paternalist". Since the 2007 Northern Territory National Emergency Response, he has co-edited two books with his partner, anthropologist Melinda Hinkson, criticising the intervention.

Altman was made a Member of the Order of Australia (AM) in the 2017 Australia Day Honour's list for significant service to tertiary education as a researcher and administrator, and to the social sciences and Indigenous economic policy.
