= Chris Gregory =

Australian economic anthropologist

Christopher A. Gregory is an Australian economic anthropologist. He is based at Australian National University (ANU) in Canberra, and has also taught at University of Manchester- where he was made Professor of Political and Economic Anthropology. He studied Economics at University of New South Wales and ANU before pursuing anthropology, following a period in Papua New Guinea. His main research has been in Papua New Guinea and Bastar District, central India, and he also co-authored a research methods manual for economic anthropology, 'Observing the Economy', with Jon Altman.

== Papua New Guinea research: Gifts and Commodities (1982) ==
Gregory first grew interested in anthropology whilst resident in Port Moresby, Papua New Guinea from 1973 to 1975. Whilst teaching economics at University of Papua New Guinea, Gregory found orthodox economic theory lacking in explanatory power for the different kinds of economic action he observed as he travelled the country. He began to read ethnographic literature on Papua New Guinea, and Marilyn Strathern's ethnography of rural migrants in Port Moresby, No Money on Our Skins, was an influence. He later familiarized himself with key works in anthropology from authors such as Marcel Mauss and Claude Levi-Strauss. Gregory's casual empirical observations during this period was to inspire his research at University of Cambridge from 1976 to 1981. His doctoral work was supervised by John Eatwell, and his thesis was examined by Maurice Godelier and Bertram Schefold. His thesis was developed into his first major book, Gifts and Commodities, during a Research Fellowship at Clare Hall, Cambridge.

Gregory's book, Gifts and Commodities, is considered a major intervention in economic anthropology, and the anthropology of Melanesia. Gregory developed a synthesis of classical political economists (such as Quesnay, Adam Smith, David Ricardo, and predominantly Karl Marx), which he found more useful than the prevailing economic theory, and classical anthropological theory (from the likes of Lewis Henry Morgan, Claude Levi-Strauss, and especially Marcel Mauss) in order to draw a series of contrasts between the logics of commodity and gift exchange. The book is in two parts: the first half develops the concepts and distinctions surrounding gift and commodity exchange, and the second half draws on ethnographic and empirical evidence to explain the economy in colonial Papua New Guinea.

Whilst some critics accused Gregory of making overdrawn binary contrast between industrialized countries and Papua New Guinea, Gregory answered his critics in his later book Savage Money, and in his preface to the second edition, explaining the book was intended precisely as an affirmation of the coexistence of gifts and commodities in late colonial Papua New Guinea (PNG), and particularly the paradoxical efflorescence of gift exchange during the colonial period. Indeed, in his preface to the first edition of the book, Gregory had written:

The colonial PNG economy presents the analyst with a very complex mixture of indigenous and imposed economic forms which changes over time and varies from place to place. It is only by pulling the complex whole apart, examining the workings of its parts as if in a vacuum, and reassembling the parts in the concrete historical situation that we can have any hope of understanding colonial PNG.

The book was aimed as a contribution to the formalist/substantivist debate in anthropology. It was reissued by HAU Books in 2015. In her foreword to the second edition, Marilyn Strathern writes that Gregory's model of exchange relations was to have a major influence on her own work, and a major impact in anthropology more generally.

== India research: Savage Money (1997) ==
In early 1980s, Gregory began to conduct long-term research in the market town of Kondagaon, in Bastar District, central India, after being introduced to the area in 1981 by Alfred Gell and his wife Simeran, as part of Alfred's project on rural markets. He then had a two year fellowship and London School of Economics in 1982-1983, during which time he returned to India for 13 months and learned Hindi. One of his mentors from Cambridge, Polly Hill, talked much to him about agrarian relations in India, as well as West Africa. After taking up a teaching position at ANU, Gregory made two return visits to India in 1985–86 (when he met with merchants in Rajasthan) and 1989– 90.

This research culminated in the book, Savage Money (1997). In his preface, Gregory says it took him a long time to publish the book, as he immersed himself in the published literature on Indian society, and because of teaching pressures. The Subaltern Studies approach that emerged in 1980s, and particularly the work of Ranajit Guha, was a major influence. Inspired by the Subaltern school, Gregory places the theme of 'alternate values' and rival value systems at the centre in order to interrogate the politics as well as the economics of commodity exchange, and the implications for an anthropologically informed theory of value. Gregory draws to a greater extent on his empirical fieldwork than in Gifts and Commodities. The research is based on mercantile families and marketing, focussing on everyday farming and mercantile values in the context of inter-family relationships. This book also marks a shift in Gregory's conceptual focus from gifts and commodities to commodities and goods (defined as inalienable keepsakes, including land).

The title, 'Savage Money' was inspired by a comment by John Harvey, who -years before- had suggested it would be a good title for a book. Gregory deploys the term not to refer to ideas of 'primitive money' that had preoccupied many economic anthropologists of the past, but to the changes in the global economy after 1971, and particularly the "free market anarchism" which dominated after Nixon's government unpegged the dollar from the gold standard. Gregory's analysis, together with Michael Hudson's writings, inspired David Graeber's discussion of the present era in Chapter 12 his bestselling book "Debt: the first 5000 years".

Since the publication of Savage Money, Gregory has published a large number of articles and papers on economic anthropology, and has continued to conduct research in India, particularly on the political economy and culture of rice-growing in central India as expressed in women's oral epics, kinship and marriage, and on land transactions.

== Personal life ==
Chris Gregory is married to Judith Robinson, a diplomat who served for a time as Acting High Commissioner to Fiji, and has two daughters.

== Principal publications ==
=== Books ===
- Gregory, C. A. and Altman, J. C., eds, 2018. T he Quest for the Good Life in Precarious Times: Informal, Ethnographic Perspectives on the Domestic Moral Economy. Canberra: ANU Press.
- Gregory, C & Vaishnav, H, eds, 2003, Lachmi Jagar: Gurumai Sukdais Story of the Bastar Rice Goddess, Chhattisgarh, India: Kaksad Publications.
- Gregory C. A. 1997. Savage Money: the anthropology and politics of commodity exchange. Amsterdam: Harwood Academic.
- Gregory C. A. and Altman, J. C., eds, 1988. Observing the Economy. London: Routledge.
- Gregory, C. A. 1982. Gifts and Commodities. London: Academic Press.
