= Society for Economic Anthropology =

Anthropology organization

- Abbreviation: SEA
- Formation: 1980
- Type: Academic society
- Parent organization: American Anthropological Association
- Website: econanthro.org

The Society for Economic Anthropology (SEA) is a group of anthropologists, archaeologists, economists, geographers and other scholars interested in the connections between economics and social life. Its members take a variety of approaches to economics: some have a substantivist perspective, while others are interested in the new institutional economics. Every year the SEA holds a spring meeting focused on a specific topic in economic anthropology. The journal Economic Anthropology is also produced annually, based on the meeting. The SEA is a section of the American Anthropological Association.

The society was founded in 1980. Harold K. Schneider served as the first president, from 1980 until 1982.

== Topics of recent spring meetings ==
- 2010 - Contested Economies: Global Tourism and Cultural Heritage. University of South Florida, Tampa, Florida
- 2009 - Weaving Across Time and Space: The Political Economy of Textiles. University of California at Los Angeles, Los Angeles, California.
- 2008 - Cooperation, University of Cincinnati, Cincinnati, Ohio.
- 2007 - The Political Economy of Hazards and Disasters, University of North Carolina at Greensboro, Greensboro, North Carolina.
- 2006 – Economics and Morality. California State University, Channel Islands, Ventural California.
- 2005 - Economies and the Transformation of Landscape. Dartmouth College. Hanover, New Hampshire.
- 2004 - Fast Food - Slow Food: Social and Economic Contexts of Food and Food Systems,Decatur, Georgia
- 2003 - Migration and Economy, Monterrey, Mexico
- 2002 - Valuables, Goods, Wealth and Money, Toronto, Canada
- 2001 - Labor, Milwaukee, WI
- 2000 - Gender in Economic Life, Indiana University, Bloomington, Indiana
- 1999 - Development Beyond the 20th Century: A Critical Discussion in Economic Anthropology, Texas A&M University, College Station, Texas
- 1998 - Theory in Economic Anthropology, Chicago, Illinois

== Titles of recent volumes ==
- Vol. 25: Economies and the Transformation of Landscape. Lisa Cliggett and Chris Poole, eds. In Progress.
- Vol. 24: Fast-Food, Slow-Food. Rick Wilk, ed. 2007
- Vol. 23: Labor in Cross-Cultural Perspective. (Paul Durrenberger and Judith Marti, eds.) Alta Mira 2006.
- Vol. 22: Migration and Economy: Global and Local Dynamics. Lillian Trager, ed. Alta Mira 2005.

== See also ==
- Economic anthropology
