= Karen Ho =

American anthropologist (born 1971)

Karen Zouwen Ho
- Born: August 25, 1971 (age 55)
- Education: Stanford University (BA, MA); Princeton University (PhD)
- Scientific career
- Fields: Economic anthropology
- Workplaces: University of Minnesota
- Thesis: Liquefying corporations and communities (2003)
- Doctoral advisor: Emily Martin

Karen Ho is an American anthropologist. She contributed to anthropological research in Wall Street culture.

== Life ==
Karen Ho grew up in a middle-class Taiwanese American household outside Memphis. Her father was a Taiwanese immigrant and doctor. She earned her undergraduate and master's degrees at Stanford University and got her PhD in anthropology from Princeton University.

== Work ==
From 1996 to 1997, Ho took a leave of absence from graduate school to work on Wall Street in order to observe the culture there. From 1998 to 1999, she conducted over 100 interviews with Wall Street employees. Her thesis and book based on her field work and interviews conclude that Wall Street culture informs employee decisions and firm strategies, and therefore has a profound impact on the economy at large.

Ho's key ideas are that the cultures of "smartness" and "hard work" on Wall Street engender a certain form of elitism which disengage investment bankers from the rest of society. The financial-based motivation of Wall Street employees is enforced by a compensation structure which rewards employees for closing deals regardless of the deals' long-term success. Furthermore, Wall Street celebrates "employee liquidity," or the ease with which it hires and lays off employees, even during a bull market. These factors contribute to investment bankers adoption a "strategy of no strategy," in which the only goal is to make money for the company (and thus themselves) in the short term. Further, Ho suggests that economic downturns are the inevitable consequence of this lack of foresight.

Ho further discusses the fallacy of meritocracy on Wall Street. While banks often profess that their employees are "the smartest people in the world," their concept of smartness encompasses a form of social aggressiveness and status that is typically reserved for affluent White males. The most lucrative and upwardly mobile side of investment banking comes from closing deals with top executives. Affluent White men are often more "well-liked" by executives, as they can be better able to play golf and talk about country clubs. Women and minorities typically need to prove themselves through less lucrative, technical aspects of banking. They must be careful in how they dress and who they interact with in order to avoid "class slippage" in the eyes of their co-workers and superiors.

Ho is currently a professor at the University of Minnesota.

== Selected publications ==
- 2009: "Disciplining Investment Bankers, Disciplining the Economy: Wall Street’s Institutional Culture of Crisis and the Downsizing of American Corporations." American Anthropologist, Vol. 111, No. 2.
- 2009: Liquidated: An Ethnography of Wall Street. Duke University Press.
- 2005: Situating Global Capitalisms: A View from Wall Street Investment Banks. Cultural Anthropology 20(1): 68–96.
