= Economic anthropology =

Academic field

Economic anthropology is a field that attempts to explain human economic behavior in its widest historic, geographic and cultural scope. It is an amalgamation of economics and anthropology. It is practiced by anthropologists and has a complex relationship with the discipline of economics, of which it is highly critical. Its origins as a sub-field of anthropology began with work by the Polish founder of anthropology Bronislaw Malinowski and the French Marcel Mauss on the nature of reciprocity as an alternative to market exchange. In an earlier German context, Heinrich Schurtz has been cited as a “founder of economic anthropology" for his pioneering inquiries into money and exchange across different cultural settings.

Post-World War II, economic anthropology was highly influenced by the work of economic historian Karl Polanyi. Polanyi drew on anthropological studies to argue that true market exchange was limited to a restricted number of western, industrial societies. Applying formal economic theory (Formalism) to non-industrial societies was mistaken, he argued. In non-industrial societies, exchange was "embedded" in such non-market institutions as kinship, religion, and politics (an idea he borrowed from Mauss). He labelled this approach Substantivism. The formalist–substantivist debate was highly influential and defined an era.

As globalization became a reality, and the division between market and non-market economies – between "the West and the Rest" – became untenable, anthropologists began to look at the relationship between a variety of types of exchange within market societies. Neo-substantivists examine the ways in which so-called pure market exchange in market societies fails to fit market ideology. Economic anthropologists have abandoned the primitivist niche they were relegated to by economists. They now study the operations of corporations, banks, and the global financial system from an anthropological perspective.

== Reciprocity and the gift ==
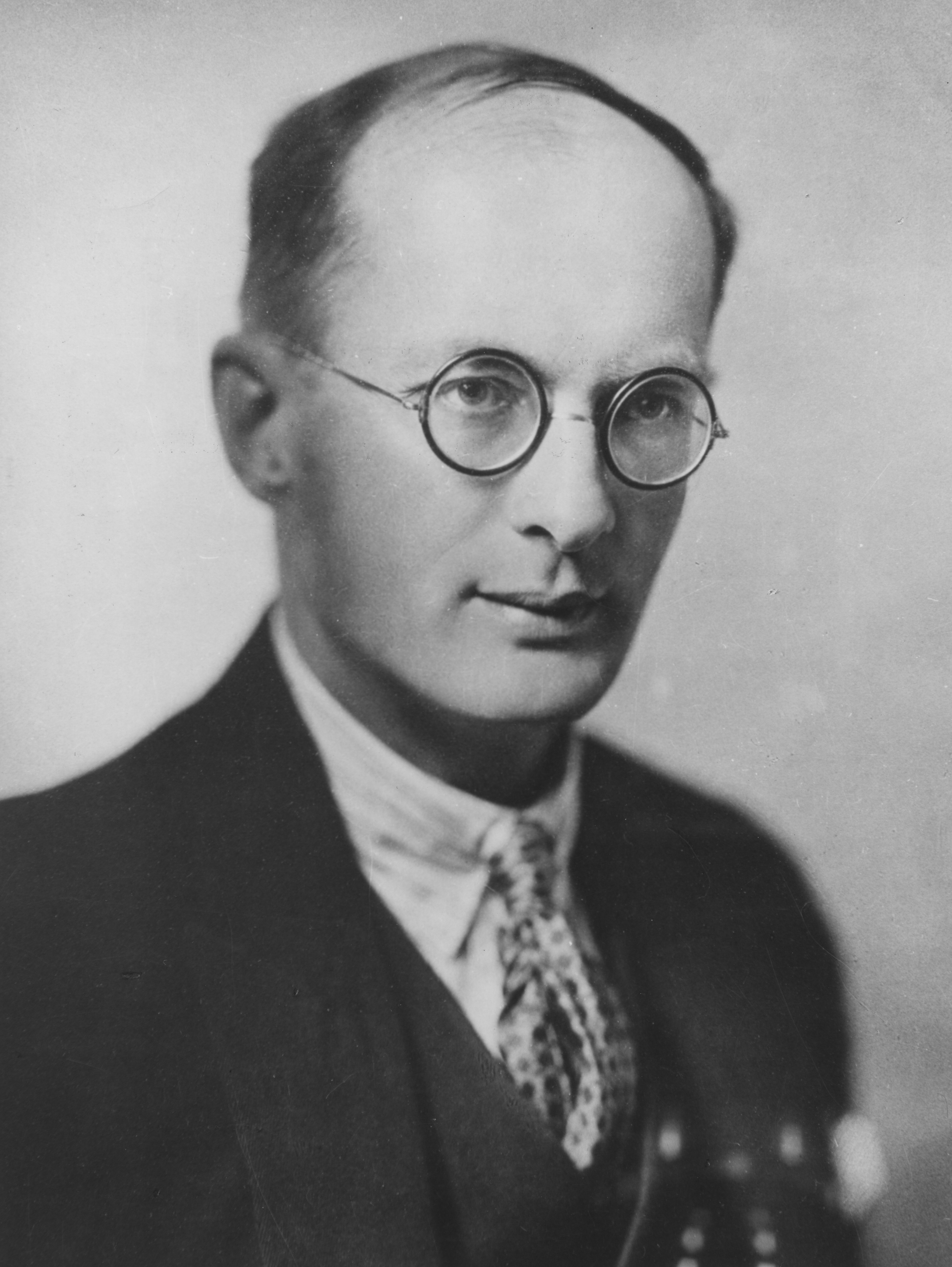
Bronislaw Malinowski, anthropologist at the London School of Economics

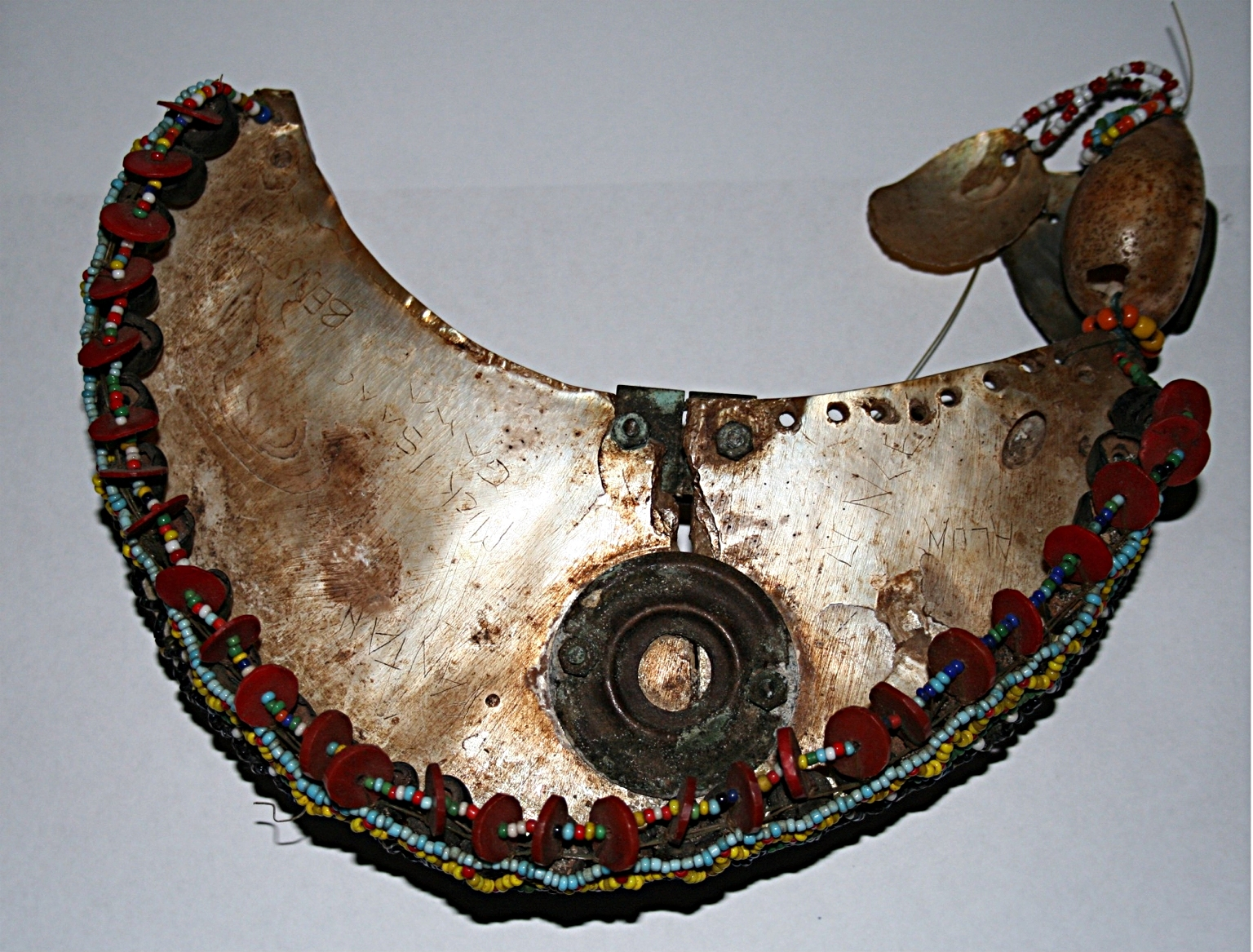
A Kula bracelet from the Trobriand Islands.

=== Malinowski and Mauss: Debate over the Kula exchange ===
Bronislaw Malinowski's groundbreaking work, Argonauts of the Western Pacific (1922), posits the question, "why would men risk life and limb to travel across huge expanses of dangerous ocean to give away what appear to be worthless trinkets?" Carefully traced the network of exchanges of bracelets and necklaces across the Trobriand Islands, Malinowski established that they were part of a system of exchange, the Kula ring. He stated that this exchange system was clearly linked to political authority.

In the 1920s and later, Malinowski's research became the subject of debate with the French anthropologist, Marcel Mauss, author of The Gift (Essai sur le don, 1925). Contrasting Mauss, Malinowski emphasised the exchange of goods between individuals, and their non-altruistic motives for giving: they expected a return of equal or greater value. In other words, reciprocity is an implicit part of gifting; no "free gift" is given without expectation of reciprocity.

Mauss, however, posited that the gifts were not merely between individuals, but between representatives of larger collectivities. These gifts were, he argued, a "total prestation." They were not simple, alienable commodities to be bought and sold, but, like the Crown jewels, embodied the reputation, history, and identity of a "corporate kin group". Given the stakes, Mauss asked, "Why anyone would give them away?" His answer was an enigmatic concept, hau, "the spirit of the gift." Largely, the confusion (and resulting debate) was due to a bad translation. Mauss appeared to be arguing that a return gift is given to keep the very relationship between givers alive; a failure to return a gift ends the relationship and the promise of any future gifts. Based on an improved translation, Jonathan Parry has demonstrated that Mauss was arguing that the concept of a "pure gift" given altruistically only emerges in societies with a well-developed market ideology.

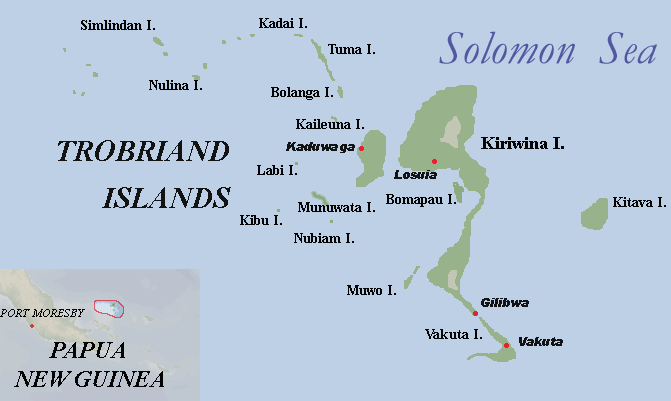

Mauss' concept of "total prestations" has been developed in the later 20th century by Annette Weiner, who revisited Malinowski's fieldsite in the Trobriand Islands. Publishing in 1992, her critique was twofold: Weiner first noted that Trobriand Island society has a matrilineal kinship system. As a consequence, women hold a great deal of economic and political power, as inheritance is passed from mother to daughter through the female lines. Malinowski missed this insight in his 1922 work, ignoring women's exchanges in his research. Secondly, Weiner further developed Mauss' argument about reciprocity and the "spirit of the gift" in terms of inalienable possessions: "the paradox of keeping while giving." Weiner contrasted "moveable goods," which can be exchanged, with "immoveable goods," which serve to draw the gifts back. In the context of the Trobriand study, male Kula gifts were moveable gifts compared to those of women's landed property. She argued that the specific goods given, such as Crown Jewels, are so identified with particular groups that, even when given they are not truly alienated. Not all societies, however, have these kinds of goods, which depend upon the existence of particular kinds of kinship groups. French anthropologist Maurice Godelier pushed the analysis further in The Enigma of the Gift (1999).

Albert Schrauwers has argued that the kinds of societies used as examples by Weiner and Godelier, such as the Kula ring in the Trobriands, the Potlatch of the Indigenous peoples of the Pacific Northwest Coast, or the Toraja of South Sulawesi, Indonesia, are all characterized by ranked aristocratic kin groups that fit with Claude Lévi-Strauss' model of "House Societies" where "House" refers to both noble lineage and their landed estate. Total prestations are given, he argues, to preserve landed estates identified with particular kin groups and maintain their place in a ranked society.

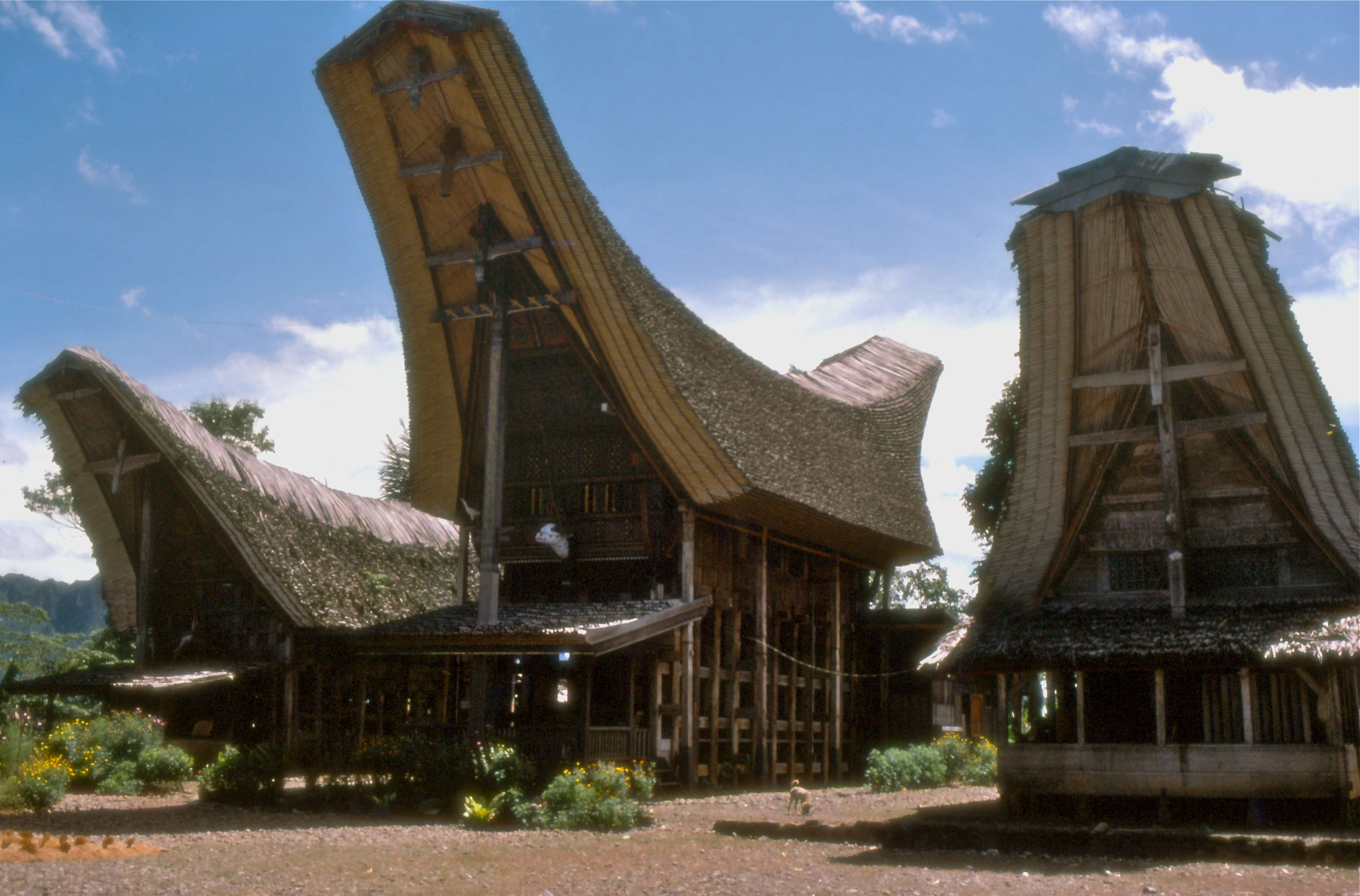
Three tongkonan noble houses in a Torajan village.

=== Gifts and commodities ===
The misunderstanding about what Mauss meant by "the spirit of the gift" led some anthropologists to contrast "gift economies" with "market economies," presenting them as polar opposites and implying that non-market exchange was always altruistic. Marshall Sahlins, a well-known American cultural anthropologist, identified three main types of reciprocity in his book Stone Age Economics (1972). Gift or generalized reciprocity is the exchange of goods and services without keeping track of their exact value, but often with the expectation that their value will balance out over time. Balanced or Symmetrical reciprocity occurs when someone gives to someone else, expecting a fair and tangible return - at a specified amount, time, and place. Market or Negative reciprocity is the exchange of goods and services whereby each party intends to profit from the exchange, often at the expense of the other. Gift economies, or generalized reciprocity, occur within closely knit kin groups, and the more distant the exchange partner, the more imbalanced or negative the exchange becomes.

This opposition was classically expressed by Chris Gregory in his book "Gifts and Commodities" (1982). Gregory argued that

Commodity exchange is an exchange of alienable objects between people who are in a state of reciprocal independence that establishes a quantitative relationship between the objects exchanged… Gift exchange is an exchange of inalienable objects between people who are in a state of reciprocal dependence that establishes a qualitative relationship between the transactors" (emphasis added.)

Commodity exchange	Gift exchange
immediate exchange	delayed exchange
alienable goods	inalienable goods
actors independent	actors dependent
quantitative relationship	qualitative relationship
between objects	between people

Other anthropologists, however, refused to see these different "exchange spheres" as polar opposites. Marilyn Strathern, writing on a similar area in Papua New Guinea, dismissed the utility of the opposition in The Gender of the Gift (1988).

=== Spheres of exchange ===
The relationship of new market exchange systems to indigenous non-market exchange remained a perplexing question for anthropologists. Paul Bohannan (see below, under substantivism) argued that the Tiv of Nigeria had three spheres of exchange, and that only certain kinds of goods could be exchanged in each sphere; each sphere had its own different form of money. Similarly, Clifford Geertz's model of "dual economy" in Indonesia, and James C. Scott's model of "moral economy" hypothesized different exchange spheres emerging in societies newly integrated into the market; both hypothesized a continuing culturally ordered "traditional" exchange sphere resistant to the market. Geertz used the sphere to explain peasant complacency in the face of exploitation, and Scott to explain peasant rebellion. This idea was taken up lastly by Jonathan Parry and Maurice Bloch, who argued in Money and the Morality of Exchange (1989) that the "transactional order" through which long-term social reproduction of the family takes place has to be preserved as separate from short-term market relations.

=== Charity: "the poison of the gift" ===
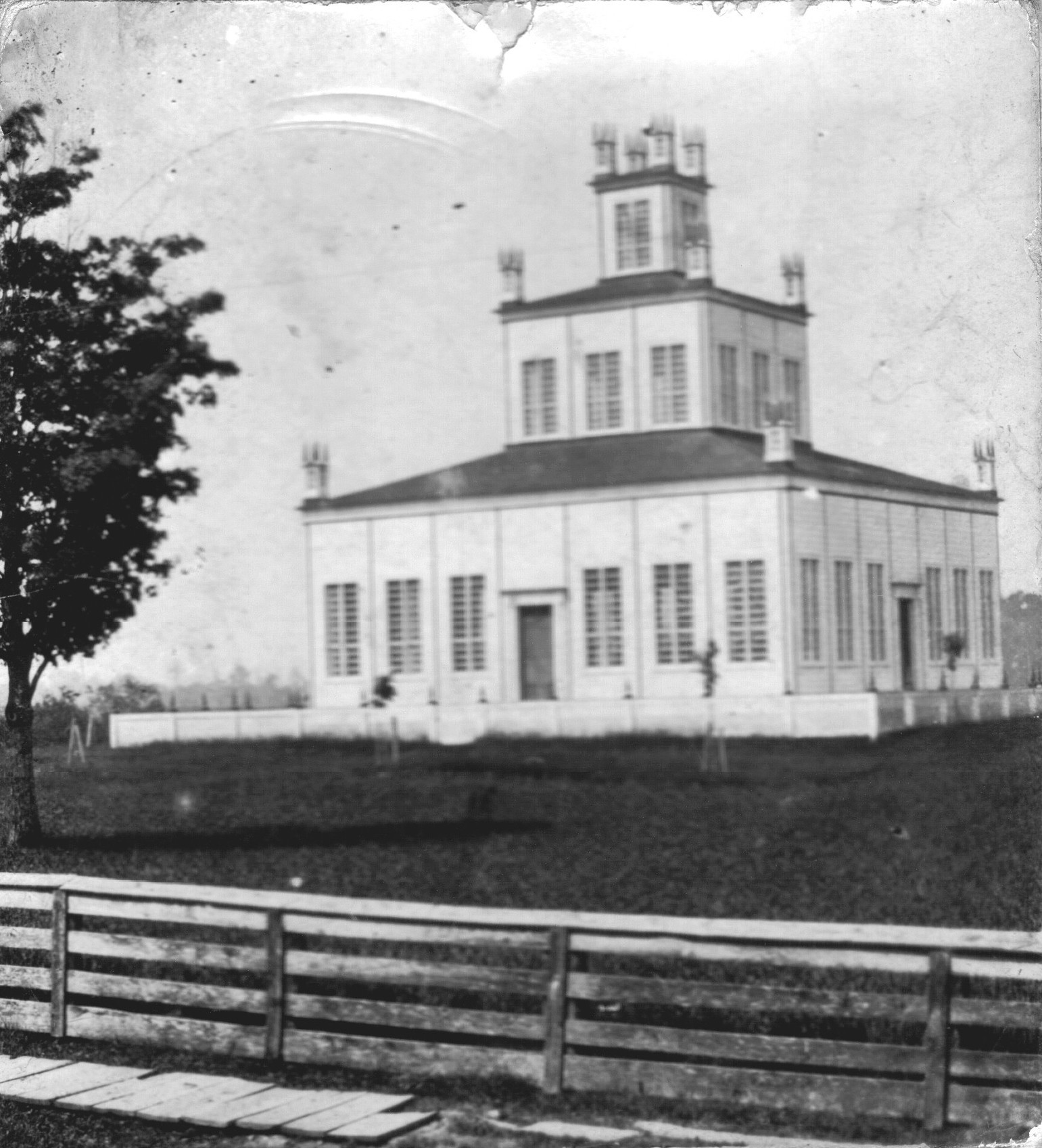
The Sharon Temple, Sharon, Ontario circa 1860.

In his classic summation of the gift exchange debate, Jonathan Parry highlighted that ideologies of the "pure gift" (as opposed to total prestations) "is most likely to arise in highly differentiated societies with an advanced division of labour and a significant commercial sector." Schrauwers illustrated the same points in two different areas in the context of the "transition to capitalism debate" (see Political Economy). He documented the transformations among the To Pamona of Central Sulawesi, Indonesia, as they were incorporated in global market networks over the twentieth century. As their everyday production and consumption activities were increasingly commodified, they developed an oppositional gift (posintuwu) exchange system that funded social reproductive activities, thereby preserving larger kin, political and religious groups. This "pure gift" exchange network emerged from an earlier system of "total prestations."

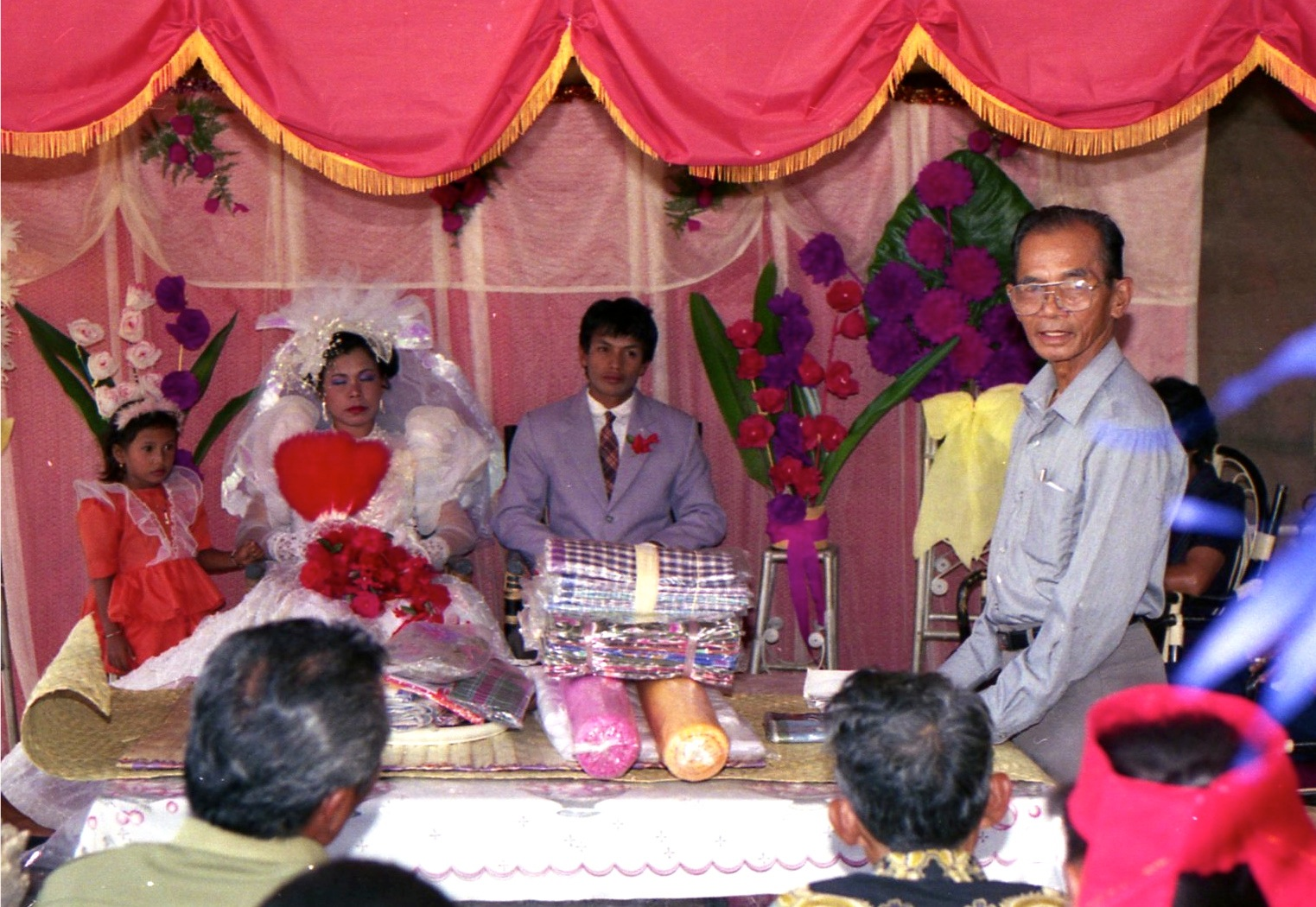
'Free gifts' of Posintuwu culminate in the exchange of bridewealth at a To Pamona wedding.

Similarly, in analyzing the same "transition to capitalist debate" in early 19th century North America, Schrauwers documented how new, oppositional "moral economies" grew in parallel with the emergence of the market economy. As the market became increasingly institutionalized, so too did early utopian socialist experiments such as the Children of Peace, in Sharon, Ontario, Canada. They built an ornate temple dedicated to sacralizing the giving of charity; this was eventually institutionalized as a mutual credit organization, land sharing, and co-operative marketing. In both cases, Schrauwers emphasizes that these alternate exchange spheres are tightly integrated and mutualistic with markets as commodities move in and out of each circuit. Parry had also underscored, using the example of charitable giving of alms in India (Dāna), that the "pure gift" of alms given with no expectation of return could be "poisonous." That is, the gift of alms embodying the sins of the giver, when given to ritually pure priests, saddled these priests with impurities that they could not cleanse themselves of. "Pure gifts" given without a return, can place recipients in debt, and hence in dependent status: the poison of the gift. Although the Children of Peace tried to sacralize the pure giving of alms, they found charity created difficulties for recipients. It highlighted their near bankruptcy and hence opened them to lawsuits and indefinite imprisonment for debt. Rather than accept charity, the free gift, they opted for loans.

=== 'The social life of things' and singularization ===
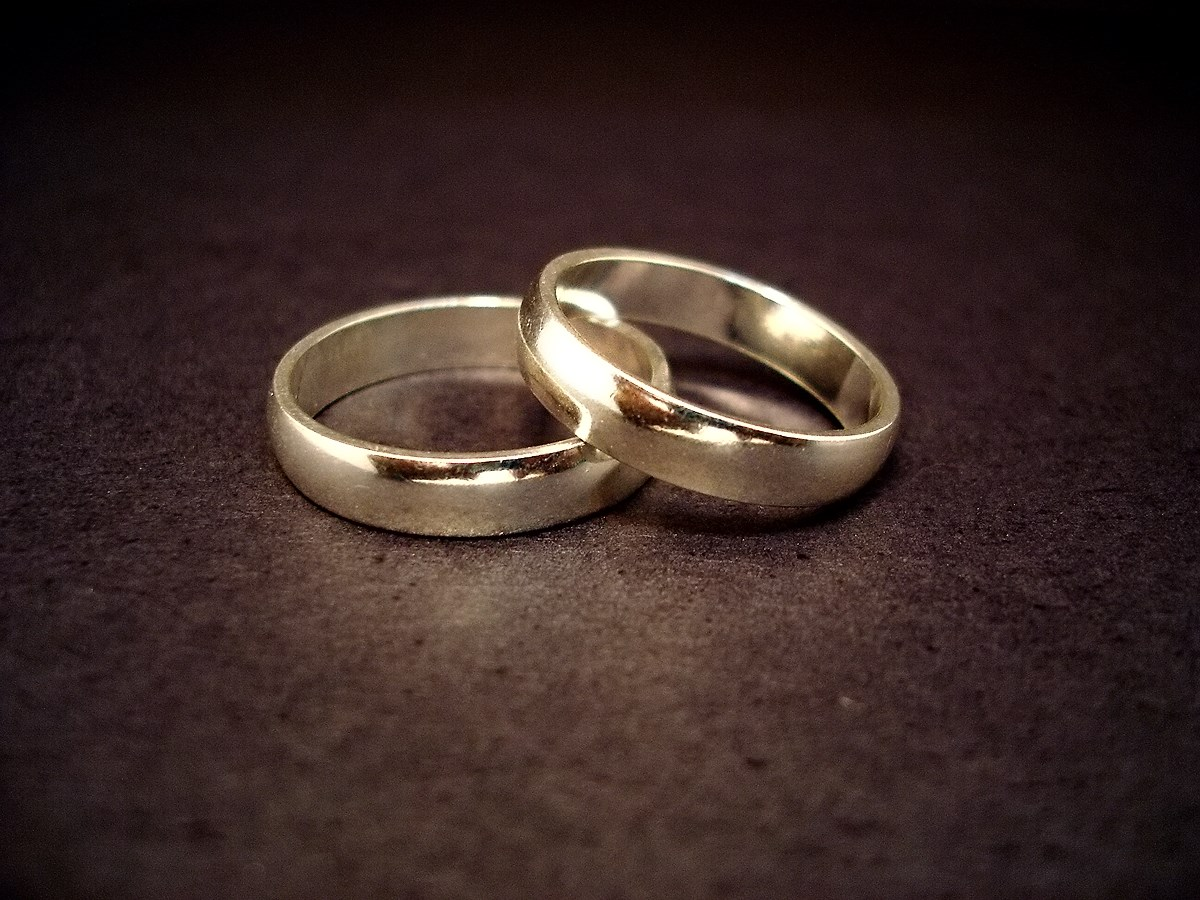
Wedding rings: commodity or pure gift?

Rather than emphasize how particular kinds of objects are either gifts or commodities to be traded in restricted spheres of exchange, Arjun Appadurai and others began to look at how objects flowed between these spheres of exchange. They shifted attention away from the character of the human relationships formed through exchange, and placed it on "the social life of things" instead. They examined the strategies by which an object could be "singularized" (made unique, special, one-of-a-kind) and so withdrawn from the market. A marriage ceremony that transforms a purchased ring into an irreplaceable family heirloom is one example; the heirloom, in turn, makes a perfect gift.

Singularization is the reverse of the seemingly irresistible process of commodification. These scholars show how all economies are a constant flow of material objects that enter and leave specific exchange spheres. A similar approach is taken by Nicholas Thomas, who examines the same range of cultures and the anthropologists who write about them, and redirects attention to the "entangled objects" and their roles as both gifts and commodities. This emphasis on things has led to new explorations in "consumption studies" (see below).

== Cultural construction of economic systems: the substantivist approach ==
=== Formalist vs substantivist debate ===
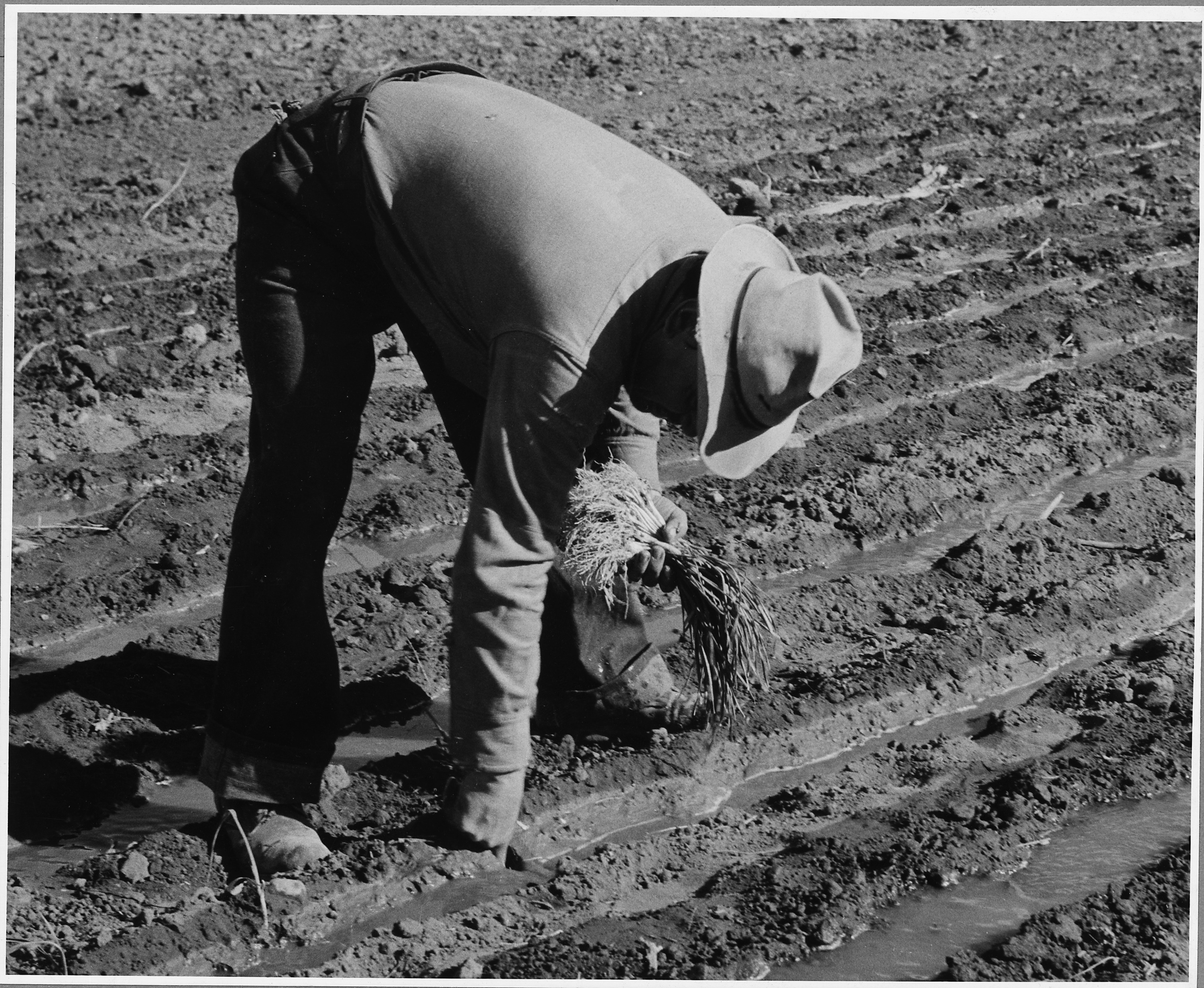
Non-market subsistence farming in New Mexico: household provisioning or 'economic' activity?

The opposition between substantivist and formalist economic models was first proposed by Karl Polanyi in his work The Great Transformation (1944). He argued that the term 'economics' has two meanings: the formal meaning refers to economics as the logic of rational action and decision-making, as rational choice between the alternative uses of limited (scarce) means. The second, substantive meaning, however, presupposes neither rational decision-making nor conditions of scarcity. It simply refers to the study of how humans make a living from their social and natural environment. A society's livelihood strategy is seen as an adaptation to its environment and material conditions, a process which may or may not involve utility maximisation. The substantive meaning of 'economics' is seen in the broader sense of 'economising' or 'provisioning'. Economics is simply the way members of society meet their material needs. Anthropologists embraced the substantivist position as empirically oriented, as it did not impose western cultural assumptions on other societies where they might not be warranted. The Formalist vs. Substantivist debate was not between anthropologists and economists, however, but a disciplinary debate largely confined to the journal Research in Economic Anthropology. In many ways, it reflects the common debates between "etic" and "emic" explanations as defined by Marvin Harris in cultural anthropology of the period. The principal proponents of the substantivist model were George Dalton and Paul Bohannan. Formalists such as Raymond Firth and Harold K. Schneider asserted that the neoclassical model of economics could be applied to any society if appropriate modifications are made, arguing that its principles have universal validity.

For some anthropologists, the substantivist position does not go far enough. Stephen Gudeman, for example, argues that the processes of making a livelihood are culturally constructed. Therefore, models of livelihoods and related economic concepts such as exchange, money or profit must be analyzed through the locals' ways of understanding them. Rather than devising universal models rooting in Western economic terminologies and then applying them indiscriminately to all societies, scholars must come to understand the 'local model'.

=== Stephen Gudeman and the culturalist approach ===
In his work on livelihoods, Gudeman seeks to present the "people's own economic construction" (1986:1); that is, people's own conceptualizations or mental maps of economics and its various aspects. His description of a peasant community in Panama reveals that the locals did not engage in exchange with each other in order to make a profit but rather viewed it as an "exchange of equivalents", with the exchange value of a good being defined by the expenses spent on producing it. Only outside merchants made profits in their dealings with the community; it was a complete mystery to the locals how they managed to do so.

Gaining a livelihood might be modelled as a causal and instrumental act, as a natural and inevitable sequence, as a result of supernatural dispositions or as a combination of all these.

— Gudeman 1986:47

Gudeman also criticizes the substantivist position for imposing their universal model of economics on preindustrial societies and so making the same mistake as the formalists. While conceding that substantivism rightly emphasises the significance of social institutions in economic processes, Gudeman considers any deductive universal model, be it formalist, substantivist or Marxist, to be ethnocentric and tautological. In his view they all model relationships as mechanistic processes by taking the logic of natural science based on the material world and applying it to the human world. Rather than to "arrogate to themselves a privileged right to model the economies of their subjects", anthropologists should seek to understand and interpret local models (1986:38). Such local models may differ radically from their Western counterparts. For example, the Iban use only hand knives to harvest rice. Although the use of sickles could speed up the harvesting process, they believe that this may cause the spirit of the rice to flee, and their desire to prevent that outcome is greater than their desire to economize the harvesting process.

Gudeman brings post-modern cultural relativism to its logical conclusion. Generally speaking, however, culturalism can also be seen as an extension of the substantivist view, with a stronger emphasis on cultural constructivism, a more detailed account of local understandings and metaphors of economic concepts, and a greater focus on socio-cultural dynamics than the latter (cf. Hann, 2000). Culturalists tend to be both less taxonomic and more culturally relativistic in their descriptions while critically reflecting on the power relationship between the ethnographer (or 'modeller') and the subjects of their research. While substantivists generally focus on institutions as their unit of analysis, culturalists lean towards detailed and comprehensive analyses of particular local communities. Both views agree in rejecting the formalist assumption that all human behaviour can be explained in terms of rational decision-making and utility maximisation.

Culturalism can be criticized from various perspectives. Marxists argue that culturalists are too idealistic in their notion of the social construction of reality and too weak in their analysis of external (i.e. material) constraints on individuals that affect their livelihood choices. If, as Gudeman argues, local models cannot be held against a universal standard, then they cannot be related to hegemonic ideologies propagated by the powerful, which serve to neutralise resistance. This is further complicated by the fact that in an age of globalization most cultures are being integrated into the global capitalist system and are influenced to conform to Western ways of thinking and acting. Local and global discourses are mixing, and the distinctions between the two are beginning to blur. Even though people will retain aspects of their existing worldviews, universal models can be used to study the dynamics of their integration into the rest of the world.

=== Entrepreneurs in "imperfect markets" ===
Inspired by a collection on "Trade and Market in the early Empires" edited by Karl Polanyi, the substantivists conducted a wide comparative study of market behavior in traditional societies where such markets were embedded in kinship, religion and politics. They thus remained focused on the social and cultural processes that shaped markets, rather than on the individual focused study of economizing behavior found in economic analysis. George Dalton and Paul Bohannon, for example, published a collection on markets in sub-Saharan Africa. Pedlars and Princes: Social Development and Economic Change in Two Indonesian Towns by Clifford Geertz compared the entrepreneurial cultures of Islamic Java with Hinduized Bali in the post-colonial period. In Java, trade was in the hands of pious Muslims, whereas in Bali, larger enterprises were organized by aristocrats. Over time, this literature was refocused on "informal economies", those market activities lying on the periphery of legal markets. Modernization theory of development had led economists in the 1950s and 1960s to expect that traditional forms of work and production would disappear in developing countries. Anthropologists found, however, that the sector had not only persisted, but expanded in new and unexpected ways. In accepting that these forms of productions were there to stay, scholars began using the term informal sector, which is credited to the British anthropologist Keith Hart in a study on Ghana in 1973. This literature focuses on the "invisible work" done by those who fall outside the formal production process, such as the production of clothing by domestic workers, or those who are bound labourers in sweatshops. As these studies have shifted to the informal sector of western economies, the field has been dominated by those taking a political economy approach.

=== Neo-Substantivism and capitalism as a cultural system ===
While many anthropologists like Gudeman were concerned with peasant economic behaviour, others turned to the analysis of market societies. Economic sociologist Mark Granovetter provided a new research paradigm (neo-substantivism) for these researchers. Granovetter argued that the neo-liberal view of economic action which separated economics from society and culture promoted an 'undersocialized account' that atomises human behavior. Similarly, he argued, substantivists had an "over-socialized" view of economic actors, refusing to see the ways that rational choice could influence the ways they acted in traditional, "embedded" social roles. Neo-Substantivism overlaps with 'old' and especially new institutional economics.

Actors do not behave or decide as atoms outside a social context, nor do they adhere slavishly to a script written for them by the particular intersection of social categories that they happen to occupy. Their attempts at purposive action are instead embedded in concrete, ongoing systems of social relations.

Granovetter applied the concept of embeddedness to market societies, demonstrating that even their, "rational" economic exchanges are influenced by pre-existing social ties. In his study of ethnic Chinese business networks in Indonesia, Granovetter found individual's economic agency embedded in networks of strong personal relations. In processes of clientelization the cultivation of personal relationships between traders and customers assumes an equal or higher importance than the economic transactions involved. Economic exchanges are not carried out between strangers but rather by individuals involved in long-term continuing relationships.

== Money and finance ==
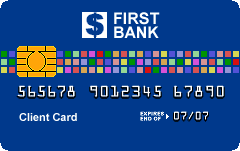
A sample picture of a fictional ATM card. The largest part of the world's money exists only as accounting numbers which are transferred between financial computers. Various plastic cards and other devices give individual consumers the power to electronically transfer such money to and from their bank accounts, without the use of currency.

=== Special and general purpose of money ===
Early anthropologists of the substantivist school were struck by the number of "special purpose monies," like wampum and shell money, that they encountered. These special purpose monies were used to facilitate trade, but were not the "universal" money of market-based economies. Universal money served five functions:

- Medium of exchange: they facilitated trade
- Unit of account: they are an abstract measure of value or worth
- Store of value: they allow wealth to be preserved over time
- Standard of deferred payment: they are a measure of debt
- Means of payment: they can be used in non-market situations to pay debts (like taxes).

Special purpose monies, in contrast, were frequently restricted in their use; they might be limited to a specific exchange sphere such as the brass rods used by the Tiv of Nigeria in the early twentieth century (see "spheres of exchange" above). Most of this early work documented the effects of universal money on these special purpose monies. Universal money frequently weakened the boundaries between exchange spheres. Others have pointed out, however, how alternative currencies such as Ithaca HOURS in New York state are used to create new community based spheres of exchange in western market economies by fostering barter.

Much of this work was updated and retheorized in the edited collection: Money and Modernity: State and Local Currencies in Melanesia. A second collection, Money and the morality of exchange examined how "general purpose money" could be transformed into a "special purpose money" - how money could be "socialized" and stripped of its moral danger so that it abets domestic economies free of market demands.

William Reddy undertook the same kind of analysis of the meanings of monetary exchange in terms of the growth of Liberalism in early modern Europe. Reddy critiques what he calls the "Liberal illusion" that developed in this period, that money is a universal equivalent and a principle of liberation. He underscores the different values and meanings that money has for those of different classes.

=== Barter ===
David Graeber argues that the inefficiencies of barter in archaic society has been used by economists since Adam Smith to explain the emergence of money, the economy, and hence the discipline of economics itself. "Economists of the contemporary orthodoxy... propose an evolutionary development of economies which places barter, as a 'natural' human characteristic, at the most primitive stage, to be superseded by monetary exchange as soon as people become aware of the latter's greater efficiency." However, extensive investigation since then has established that "No example of a barter economy, pure and simple, has ever been described, let alone the emergence from it of money; all available ethnography suggests that there never has been such a thing. But there are economies today which are nevertheless dominated by barter."

Anthropologists have argued "that when something resembling barter does occur in stateless societies it is almost always between strangers, people who would otherwise be enemies." Barter occurred between strangers, not fellow villagers, and hence cannot be used to naturalistically explain the origin of money without the state. Since most people engaged in trade knew each other, exchange was fostered through the extension of credit. Marcel Mauss, author of 'The Gift', argued that the first economic contracts were to not act in one's economic self-interest, and that before money, exchange was fostered through the processes of reciprocity and redistribution, not barter. Everyday exchange relations in such societies are characterized by generalized reciprocity, or a non-calculative familial "communism" where each takes according to their needs, and gives as they have.

Other anthropologists have questioned whether barter is typically between "total" strangers, a form of barter known as "silent trade". However, Benjamin Orlove has shown that barter occurs through "silent trade" (between strangers), but also in commercial markets as well. "Because barter is a difficult way of conducting trade, it will occur only where there are strong institutional constraints on the use of money or where the barter symbolically denotes a special social relationship and is used in well-defined conditions. To sum up, multipurpose money in markets is like lubrication for machines - necessary for the most efficient function, but not necessary for the existence of the market itself."

Barter may occur in commercial economies, usually during periods of monetary crisis. During such a crisis, currency may be in short supply, or highly devalued through hyperinflation. In such cases, money ceases to be the universal medium of exchange or standard of value. Money may be in such short supply that it becomes an item of barter itself rather than the means of exchange. Barter may also occur when people cannot afford to keep money (as when hyperinflation quickly devalues it).

=== Money as commodity fetish ===
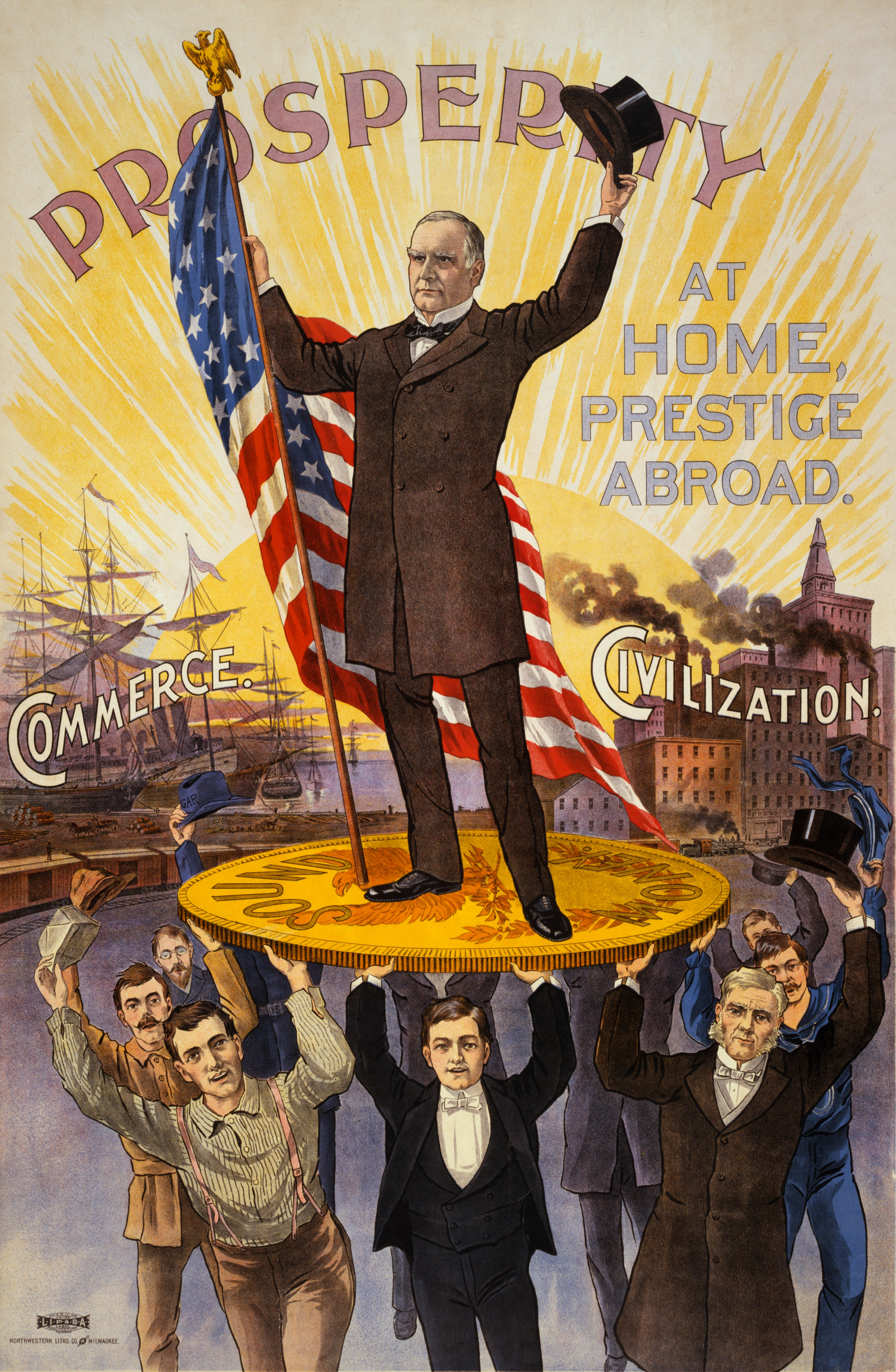
Metal money fetishism: A political poster shows gold coin as the basis of prosperity. (ca. 1896)

Anthropologists have analyzed these cultural situations where universal money is being introduced as a means of revealing the underlying cultural assumptions about money that market based societies have internalized. Michael Taussig, for example, examined the reactions of peasant farmers in Colombia as they struggled to understand how money could make interest. Taussig highlights that we have fetishized money. We view money as an active agent, capable of doing things, of growth. In viewing money as an active agent, we obscure the social relationships that actually give money its power. The Colombian peasants, seeking to explain how money could bear interest, turned to folk beliefs like the "baptism of money" to explain how money could grow. Dishonest individuals would have money baptized, which would then become an active agent; whenever used to buy goods, it would escape the till and return to its owner.

Schrauwers similarly examines a situation where paper money was introduced for the first time, in early nineteenth century Ontario, Canada. Paper money, or bank notes, were not a store of wealth; they were an I.O.U., a "promisory note," a fetish of debt. Banks in the era had limited capital. They didn't loan that capital. Instead, they issued paper notes promising to pay that amount should the note be presented in their office. Since these notes stayed in circulation for lengthy periods, banks had little fear they would have to pay, and so issued many more notes than they could redeem, and charged interest on all of them. Utilizing Bourdieu's concept of symbolic capital, Schrauwers examines the way that elite social status was converted into economic capital (the bank note). The bank note's value depended entirely on the public's perceptions that it could be redeemed, and that perception was based entirely on the social status of the bank's shareholders.

=== Banking, finance and the stock market ===
More recent work has focused on finance capital and stock markets. Anna Tsing for example, analyzed the "Bre-X stock scandal" in Canada and Indonesia in terms of "The economy of appearances." Ellen Hertz, in contrast, looked at the development of stock markets in Shanghai, China, and the particular ways in which this free market was embedded in local political and cultural realities; markets do not operate in the same manner in all countries. A similar study was done by Karen Ho on Wall Street, during the 2008 financial crisis. Her book, Liquidated: an ethnography of Wall Street, provides an insiders view of how "market rationality" works, and how it is embedded in particular kinds of social networks.

Bill Maurer has examined how Islamic bankers who are seeking to avoid religiously proscribed interest payments have remade money and finance in Indonesia. His book, Mutual Life, Limited, compares these Islamic attempts to remake the basis of money to local currency systems in the United States, such as "Ithaca Hours." In doing so, he questions what it is that gives money its value. This same question of what gives money its value is also addressed in David Graeber's book Towards an Anthropological Theory of Value: The false coin of our own dreams.

James Carrier has extended the cultural economic and neo-substantivist position by applying their methods to the "science of economics" as a cultural practice. He has edited two collections that examine "free market" ideologies, comparing them to the culturally embedded economic practices they purport to describe. The edited collection, "Meanings of the market: the Free Market in Western Culture", examined the use of market models in policy-making in the United States. A second edited collection "Virtualism: A New Political Economy," examined the cultural and social effects on western nations forced to adhere to abstract models of the free market: "Economic models are no longer measured against the world they seek to describe, but instead the world is measured against them, found wanting and made to conform."

== The anthropology of corporate capitalism ==
=== Symbolic and economic capital ===
Similar insights were developed by Pierre Bourdieu, who also rejected the arguments of the new institutional economists. While these economists attempted to incorporate culture in their models, they did so by arguing that non-market "tradition" was the product of rational maximizing action in the market (i.e., to show they are the solution to an economic problem, rather than having deep cultural roots). Bourdieu argued strongly against what he called RAT (Rational Action Theory) theory, arguing that any actor, when asked for an explanation for their behaviour will provide a rational post hoc answer, but that excuse does not in fact guide the individual in the act. Driving a car is an example; individuals do so out of an acquired "instinct", obeying the rules of the road without actually focusing upon them. Bourdieu utilized an alternate model, which emphasized how "economic capital" could be translated into "symbolic capital" and vice versa. For example, in traditional Mexican villages, those of wealth would be called upon to fulfill "cargo offices" in the church, and host feasts in honour of the saints. These offices used up their economic capital, but in so doing, it was translated into status (symbolic capital) in the traditional role. This symbolic capital could, in turn, be used to draw customers in the marketplace because of a reputation for honesty and selflessness.

=== Actor–network theory ===
Michel Callon has spearheaded the movement of applying actor–network theory approaches to study economic life (notably economic markets). This body of work interrogates the interrelation between the economy and economics, highlighting the ways in which economics (and economics-inspired disciplines such as marketing) shapes the economy (see Callon, 1998 and 2005).

=== Ethnographies of the corporation ===
Corporations are increasingly hiring anthropologists as employees and consultants, leading to an increasingly critical appraisal about the organizational forms of post-modern capitalism. Aihwa Ong's Spirits of resistance and capitalist discipline: factory women in Malaysia (1987) was pathbreaking in this regard. Her work inspired a generation of anthropologists who have examined the incorporation of women within corporate economies, especially in the new "Free trade zones" of the newly industrializing third world. Others have focused on the former industrialized (now rust-belt) economies. Daromir Rudnyckyj has analyzed how neo-liberal economic discourses have been utilized by Indonesian Muslims operating the Krakatau Steel Company to create a "spiritual economy" conducive to globalization while enhancing the Islamic piety of workers. George Marcus has called for anthropologists to "study up" and to focus on corporate elites, and has edited a series called Late Editions: Cultural Studies for the End of the Century. Adam Sargent's ethnographic work on Indian construction sites has examined how workers contest class distinctions through embodied practices and refusal of certain forms of labor, demonstrating how economic anthropology can illuminate the cultural construction of work hierarchies and worker resistance in contemporary capitalist contexts.

== Notable people ==
Contemporary economic anthropologists include:

- Karen Ho
- David Graeber
- Jason Hickel
- Hannah Appel
- Arjun Appadurai
- Jessica Cattelino
- Adam Sargent

== See also ==
- Charity (practice)
- Critique of political economy
- Cultural economics
- Dāna
- Economic sociology
- Money
- Palace economy
- Society for Economic Anthropology
