= Formalist–substantivist debate =

Debate between substantivist and formalist economic models

The opposition between substantivist and formalist economic models was first proposed by Karl Polanyi in his work The Great Transformation (1944).

== Overview ==
Polanyi argued that the term economics has two meanings: the formal meaning refers to economics as the logic of rational action and decision-making, as a rational choice between the alternative uses of limited (scarce) means. The second, substantive meaning, however, presupposes neither rational decision-making nor conditions of scarcity. It simply refers to the study of how humans make a living from their social and natural environment. A society's livelihood strategy is seen as an adaptation to its environment and material conditions, a process that may or may not involve utility maximisation. The substantive meaning of economics is seen in the broader sense of provisioning. Economics is simply the way society meets its material needs. Anthropologists embraced the substantive position as empirically oriented as they believed it did not impose western cultural assumptions on other societies where they might not be warranted.

The formalist vs. substantivist debate was not between anthropologists and economists, however, but a disciplinary debate largely confined to the journal Research in Economic Anthropology. In many ways, it reflects the common debates between etic and emic explanations as defined by Marvin Harris in cultural anthropology of the period. The principal proponents of the substantivist model were George Dalton and Paul Bohannan. Formalists such as Raymond Firth and Harold K. Schneider asserted that the neoclassical model of economics could be applied to any society if appropriate modifications are made, arguing that its principles have universal validity.

== The formalist position ==
The formalist model is closely linked to neoclassical economics, defining economics as the study of choice under conditions of scarcity. All societies are therefore a collection of "choice making individuals whose every action involves conscious or unconscious selections among alternative means to alternative ends" or culturally defined goals. (Burling, 1962, quoted from Prattis, 1982:207). Goals refer not only to economic value or financial gain but to anything that is valued by the individual, be it leisure, solidarity or prestige.

Since a formalist model usually states what is to be maximized in terms of preferences, which often but not necessarily include culturally expressed value goals, it is deemed to be sufficiently abstract to explain human behavior in any context. A traditional assumption many formalists borrow from neoclassical economics is that the individual will make rational choices based on full information, or information that is incomplete in a specific way, in order to maximize whatever that individual considers being of value. While preferences may vary or change, and information about choices may or may not be complete, the principles of economising and maximising still apply.

The role of the anthropologist may then be to analyse each culture in regards to its culturally appropriate means of attaining culturally recognized and valued goals. Individual preferences may differ from culturally recognized goals, and under economic rationality assumptions individual decisions are guided by individual preferences in an environment constrained by culture, including the preferences of others. Such an analysis should uncover the culturally specific principles that underlie the rational decision-making process. In this way, economic theory has been applied by anthropologists to societies without price-regulating markets (e.g. Firth, 1961; Laughlin, 1973).

== The substantivist position ==
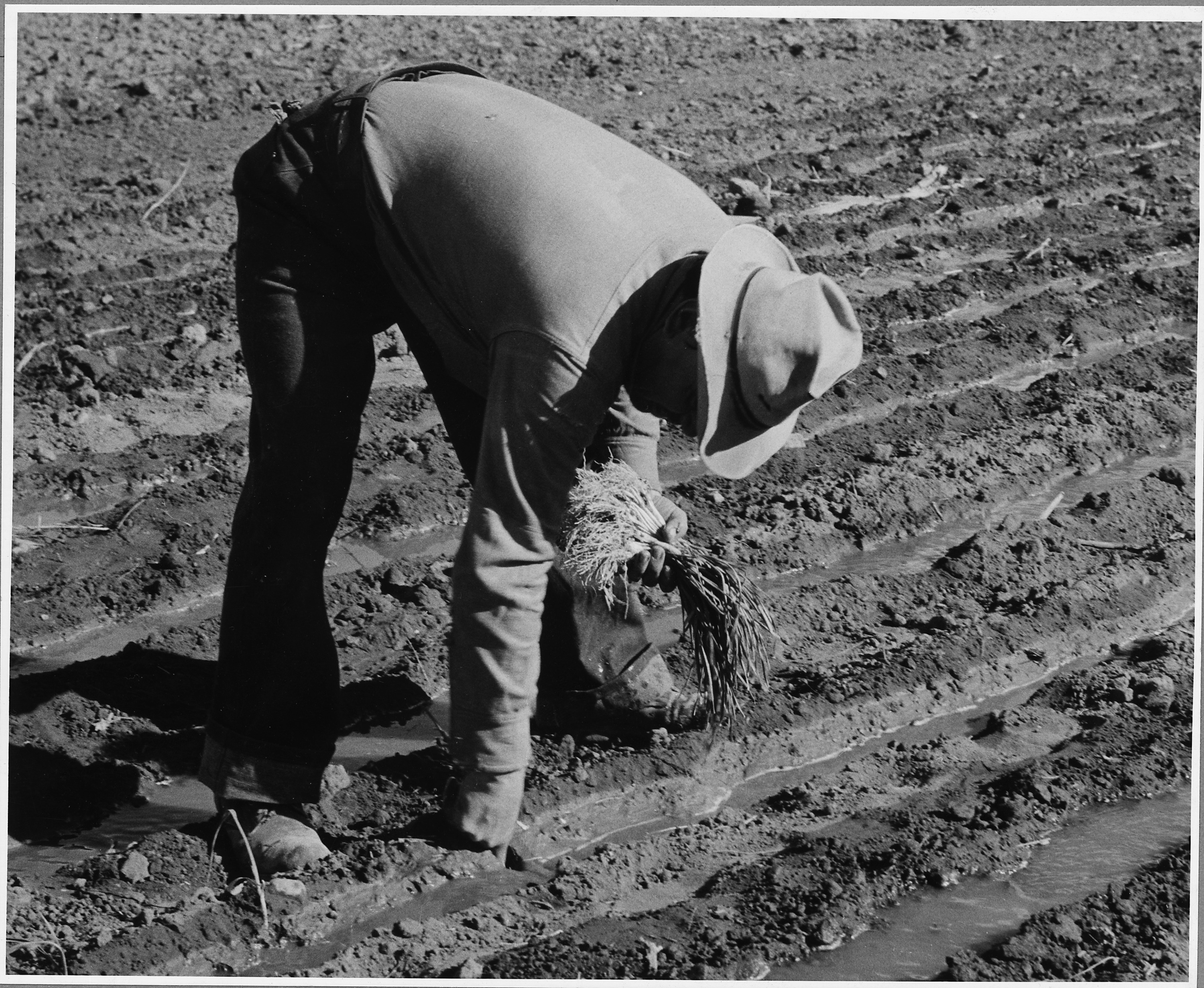
Non-market subsistence farming in New Mexico: household provisioning or 'economic' activity?

Polanyi's term, "the great transformation," refers to the divide between modern, market-dominated societies and non-Western, non-capitalist pre-industrial societies. Polanyi argues that only the substantive meaning of economics is appropriate for analysing the latter. According to Polanyi, in modern capitalist economies the concepts of formalism and substantivism coincide since people organise their livelihoods based on the principle of rational choice. However, in non-Capitalist, pre-industrial economies this assumption does not hold. Unlike their Western capitalist counterparts, their livelihoods are not based on market exchange but on redistribution and reciprocity. Reciprocity is defined as the mutual exchange of goods or services as part of long-term relationships. Redistribution implies the existence of a strong political centre such as kinship-based leadership, which receives and then redistributes subsistence goods according to culturally specific principles. In societies that are not market-based, reciprocity and redistribution usually occur together. Conversely, market exchange is seen as the dominant mode of integration in modern industrial societies, while reciprocity may continue in family and inter-household relations, and some redistribution is undertaken by the state or by charitable institutions. Each of these three systems of distribution requires a separate set of analytical concepts.

Without a system of price-making markets formal economic analysis does not apply, as for example, in centrally planned economies or preindustrial societies. Economic decision-making in such places is not so much based on individual choice, but rather on social relationships, cultural values, moral concerns, politics, religion or the fear instilled by authoritarian leadership. Production in most peasant and tribal societies is for the producers, also called 'production for use' or subsistence production, as opposed to 'production for exchange' which has profit maximisation as its chief aim. These types differ so radically that no single theory can describe them all.

This difference in types of economy is explained by the 'embeddedness' of economic (i.e. provisioning) activities in other social institutions such as kinship in non-market economies. Rather than being a separate and distinct sphere, the economy is embedded in both economic and non-economic institutions. Exchange takes place within and is regulated by society rather than being located in a social vacuum. For example, religion and government can be just as important to economics as economic institutions themselves. Socio-cultural obligations, norms and values play a significant role in people's livelihood strategies. Consequently, any analysis of economics as an analytically distinct entity isolated from its socio-cultural and political context is flawed from the outset. A substantivist analysis of economics will therefore focus on the study of the various social institutions on which people's livelihoods are based. The market is only one amongst many institutions that determine the nature of economic transactions. Polanyi's central argument is that institutions are the primary organisers of economic processes. The substantive economy is an "instituted process of interaction between man and his environment, which results in a continuous supply of want satisfying material means" (1968:126).

== Course of the debate ==
Critics of the formalist position question its central assumptions, in particular that the universality of rational choice and utility maximization can be assumed across all cultures, including its reductionism to explain even modern Western economies. Prattis noted that the premise of utility maximization is tautological; whatever a person does, may it be work or leisure, is declared to be utility maximization, a premise that can never be contradicted or disproven. If they do not maximize money then it must be pleasure or some other value. To quote: "This post hoc reasoning back to a priori assumptions has minimal scientific value as it is not readily subject to falsification." (1989:212). For example, a person may sacrifice their own time, finances, or even health to help others. Formalists would then pronounce that they do so because they value helping others, and so sacrifice other goals in order to maximize this value (e.g. meaning, satisfaction of having helped, approval from others etc.)

Similarly, Gudeman argued that Western economic anthropologists will invariably find the people they study behave "rationally" since that is what their model leads them to do. Conversely, formalism will consider any behavior that does not maximize utility based on available means as irrational even though such "non-maximising acts" may seem perfectly rational and logical to the individual whose actions may have been motivated by a completely different set of meanings and understandings. Finally, there is the substantivist point that both economic institutions and individual economic activities are embedded in social and cultural institutions and can therefore not be analysed in isolation. Social relationships play an essential role in people's livelihood strategies; consequently, a narrow focus on atomised individual behavior to the exclusion of their socio-cultural context is bound to be flawed.

Substantivism has also had its critics. Prattis (1982) argued that the strict distinction between primitive and modern economies in substantivism is problematic. He implies that substantivism focuses on social structures at the expense of analyzing individual agency. Non-maximizing adaptation strategies occur in all societies, not just in "primitive" ones. Similarly, Plattner (1989) argues that generalization across different societies is still possible, meaning that Western and non-Western economics are not entirely different. In an age of globalization there are no "pure" preindustrial societies left. Conditions of resource scarcity exist everywhere in the world. Anthropological fieldwork has demonstrated rational behavior and complex economic choices amongst peasants (cf. Plattner, 1989:15). For example, individuals in communist societies can still engage in rational utility maximizing behavior by building relationships with bureaucrats who control distribution, or by using small plots of land in their garden to supplement official food rations. Cook observed that there are significant conceptual problems with substantivists’ theories: "They define economics as an aspect of everything that provisions society but nothing that provisions society is defined as economic." (1973:809).
