= Granovetter =

Granovetter is a surname. Notable people with the surname include:

- Mark Granovetter (born 1943), American academic
- Matt Granovetter (born 1950), American bridge player
