= Substantivism =

Argument by Karl Polanyi that economics is deeply rooted in societal change

Substantivism is an economic position that helps to explain the social relations embedded within the economy. It was first proposed by Karl Polanyi, who argues that the term "economics" has two meanings. The formal meaning, used by today's neoclassical economists, refers to economics as the logic of rational action and decision-making, as rational choice between the alternative uses of limited (scarce) means, as "economizing", "maximizing", or "optimizing".

The second, substantive meaning presupposes neither rational decision-making nor conditions of scarcity. It refers to how humans make a living interacting within their social and natural environments. A society's livelihood strategy is seen as an adaptation to its environment and material conditions, a process which may or may not involve utility maximization. The substantive meaning of 'economics' is seen in the broader sense of 'provisioning.' Economics is the way society meets material needs.

== Embeddedness ==
Polanyi argued that in non-market societies there are no pure economic institutions to which formal economic models can be applied. In these cases economic activities such as provisioning are embedded in non-economic kinship, religious and political institutions. In market societies, in contrast, economic activities have been rationalized, and economic action is "disembedded" from society and able to follow its own distinctive logic, captured in economic modeling.

== See also ==
- Economic anthropology
- Formalist–substantivist debate
