= Korunk =

Korunk (Hungarian pronunciation: [ˈkoruŋk], meaning Our Age in English) is a Hungarian language monthly cultural-literary-scientific magazine published in Cluj-Napoca, Romania.

== History and profile ==
Korunk was founded by László Dienes in Cluj-Napoca in 1926. The magazine ceased publication in 1940, and began publication in 1957. In 1929 Gábor Gaál became its editor-in-chief. Ernő Gáll is the long-term editor-in-chief of the magazine who served in the post between 1957 and 1984.

The magazine has a Marxist political stance and progressive literary approach. It is published on a monthly basis.
