= Gábor Gaál =

Hungarian sociologist

- Born: March 8, 1891; Budapest, Austria-Hungary
- Died: August 13, 1954 (aged 63)
- Education: Eötvös Loránd University
- Occupations: Sociologist, literary critic, aesthetician
- Employer: Babeș-Bolyai University
- Known for: Co-editor of Korunk
- Political party: Hungarian Communist Party

Gábor Gaál (8 March 1891 – 13 August 1954) was a Hungarian sociologist, literary critic and aesthetician active in Romania.

== Biography ==
Gaál was born into the family of a military officer of the Hussar Regiment in Budapest. He studied Latin at the Eötvös Loránd University where he was politically radicalised after association with figures such as György Lukács, Béla Balázs, Ervin Šinkó and members of the anti militarist Galileo Circle. After the Aster Revolution he started to work at the ministry of culture. In 1918, Gaál became a member of the newly founded Hungarian Communist Party and during the Hungarian Soviet Republic he was an official of its People's Commissariat of Education under Lukács. After the fall of the Soviet Republic, he fled to Vienna where he published his works in multiple Hungarian émigré newspapers and magazines.

In the fall of 1925, he returned to Budapest, where he was arrested for his revolutionary activities in 1919. He was temporarily and once again fled to Vienna, where he subsequently travelled to Cluj in 1926. He continued to work and publish in multiple Hungarian language newspapers in Romania.

In 1928, Gaál became a co-editor of the Korunk magazine with László Dienes, and eventually chief editor of the magazine from 1931, a position which he held until 1940. During the Second World War he was forced in to military service and was sent to the front, eventually returning to Cluj in 1945 as a prisoner of war.

In the post-war years in Romania, Gaál became one of the most prominent cultural ideologues and theorists of Socialist realism. In 1946 he was appointed a professor of philosophy at the Babeș-Bolyai University where he gave seminars on Marxist philosophy. In the same year he became he became the first editor-in-chief of Utunk and the president of the Hungarian Writers' Association in Romania.

He was in a leading position in the Hungarian People's Union and took part in the reorganization of the Romanian Academy, where was elected a member in 1948.

From late 1948, Gaál fell out of favour from the Communist government and was accused of opportunism and Hegelianism. He was eventually expelled from the party in 1950 and his appeal to rejoin the party was rejected.

In the summer of 1952, Gaál suffered a stroke, which caused him to stop his literary activity and left many of his works unfinished. He died two years later in August 1954.

== Selected publications ==
- Valóság és irodalom (Bucharest, 1950); Válogatotto írások 1921–1940 (Bucharest, 1964).
- Válogatót írások I. 1921–1940 (tanulmányok és cikkek Sugár Erzsébet edugátében, 1964);
- II. 1921–1940 (publicistics, Sugár Erzsébet régüstében, 1965);
- III. 1946–1952 (publicisztikai írások Kovács Erzsébet, filósófiai gyódekek Tóth Sándor edegútében, 1971);
- Legynyt kortársak (Széll Zsuzsa és Tordai Zádor vágálása, Bp. 1973);
- Erről van szó (vágálotott írások Tóth Sándor úrázában, Tanulók Könyvtára, Kv. 1974);
- Levelek 1921–1945 (sajtó alá rendezte, sajdekekkel ellátta és az utószót erita Sugár Erzsébet, 1975);
- Vidéki storény (cikkek 1926–1928. Válogatta, váváðurte, gyáedekekkel ellátta Tóth Sándor, Téka 1977).
