= László Dienes =

László Dienes (27 March 1889 – 5 April 1953) was a Hungarian sociologist, essayist, librarian and university professor.

== Biography ==
He was born in Tokaj in a Protestant noble family. He completed his secondary school studies at the reformed college in Debrecen and enrolled at the Faculty of Law at the University of Budapest, and studied in Paris for two years.

At a young age, he joined the socialist left-wing organization of the Galileo Circle and was a student of Ervin Szabó the head of the Capital Library in Budapest. His works on library science and literary criticism were published from 1914, his anti-war articles were published in Huszadik Század. In the fall of 1918 he became a founding member of the Hungarian Communist Party and became a city people's commissar of Budapest during the Hungarian Soviet Republic.

In the fall of 1919, together with his friend György Bölöni, he settled in Romania as a political emigrant, and together they started the Bucharest Newspaper. He also worked for magazines such as Napkelet and Nyugati szemle where he regularly reported on Western avant-garde currents in his column, and he himself appeared in the columns of the paper with surrealist short stories. He settled in Cluj-Napoca in 1922 and was an editorial member of Keleti Újság until 1925.

In 1926 Dienes founded the Korunk magazine. After Iron Guard students almost beat him to death because of his radical works he sought refuge in Berlin with his wife, university professor of chemistry Júlia Götz, and their children in 1928. It was then that he handed over the editorship of Korunk to Gábor Gaál.

As a co-editor, his name appeared at the head of Korunk until August 1931, when he moved to Moscow where he worked as a language teacher and bibliographer until 1945. Dienes returned to Hungary in late 1945, where until his death he was the director of the Ervin Szabó Library in Fővárosi and the head teacher of the economics department at the law faculty of the University of Budapest.
