= Blanka Pikler =

Hungarian activist and librarian

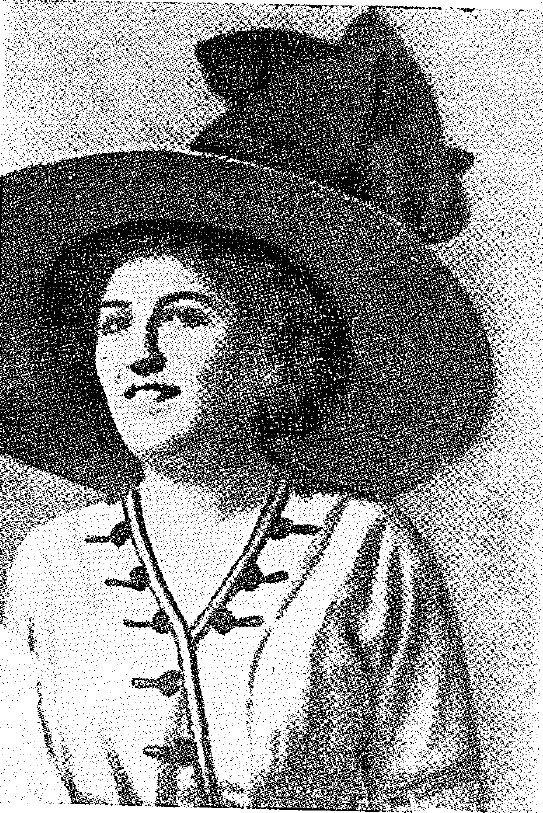
- Born: 25 March 1883; Budapest
- Died: 11 April 1957 (aged 74); Budapest
- Known for: Feminist activist

Blanka Pikler (25 March 1883 – 11 April 1957) was a Hungarian activist and librarian. She was the secretary of the Feminist Association (Feministák Egyesülete).

== Life ==
Pikler was born in Budapest in 1883 to a middle class family. Her father had studied medicine but did not qualify. He had opened a cafe. Blanka was sent to a private school where her interests were music and maths.

In 1908 she began work at the Metropolitan Library where she became part of Ervin Szabó's inner circle. By 1911 she was leading their catalogue department. In 1919 the University of Budapest decided to get rid of communists, but this turned into a purge of Jews, due to many communist intellectuals and revolutionaries being Jewish. Pikler was arrested and held for two weeks although as friends noted she disliked communists and communism. She was not beaten, but she was dismissed.

In 1925 she co-authored a book that created an index of all the books in Hungarian.

In 1945 she was restored to the job she had lost years before.

She published a range of books including her catalogues and a history of the Budapest library.

She died in April 1957.
