= Lili Hajdú Gimesné =

Hungarian psychiatrist and psychoanalyst (1891–1960)

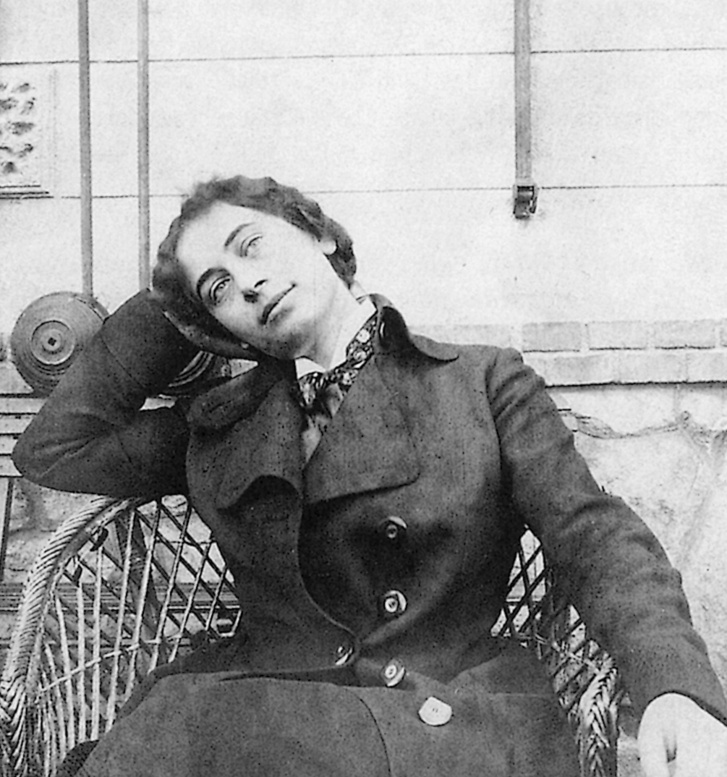
- Born: 1 November 1891; Miskolc, Hungary
- Disappeared: 27 May 1960
- Died: Budapest, Hungary
- Cause of death: suicide
- Education: Eötvös Loránd University
- Employer: Ministry of Public Healthcare
- Organization(s): Galileo Circle; Hungarian Psychoanalytic Association
- Political party: Hungarian Communist Party
- Spouse: Miklós Gimes (m. 1915)
- Children: 2, including Miklós Gimes

Lili Hajdú Gimesné (née Hochmann, 1 November 1891 – 27 May 1960) was a Hungarian psychiatrist and psychoanalyst. She was president of the Hungarian Psychoanalytic Association and was director of the National Institute of Psychiatry and Neurology.

== Biography ==
Lili Hajdú Gimesné was born on 1 November 1891 in Miskolc, Hungary, to an assimilated Jewish family. Her parents were merchant Max Hochmann, who changed his name to Mihály Hajdú, and Terézia Kellner. Gimesné had four siblings.

From 1909, Gimesné studied medicine at Eötvös Loránd University in Budapest. She was one of the first women graduates and called herself a "girl of tomorrow." After graduating, she worked at Moravcsik Psychiatric Hospital.

As a student, Gimesné was a member of the left-wing Galileo Circle (Hungarian: Galilei Kör), founded by her brother-in-law, Zsigmond Kende. She met her future husband Miklós Gimes in the organisation and they married on 27 March 1915.

During the short-lived Hungarian Soviet Republic rump state of 1919, Gimesné worked at the Ministry of Public Healthcare. In 1920, Gimesné and her husband converted to the Unitarian Christian faith.

In the 1920s, Gimesné trained as a psychoanalyst under Vilma Kovács [hu] and Sándor Ferenczi (a close associate of Sigmund Freud). Her theoretical work focused on the psychoanalytic therapy of schizophrenia and she published on etiology and therapy. From 1921 onward, Gimesné directed the Budapest Frimm Institute for disabled children. In 1927, she opened her own institute, Dr. G. Hajdu's Children's Camp and Institute for Therapeutic Education which operated until its bankruptcy in 1933.

During World War II and the Nazi German occupation of Budapest, Gimesné's husband was deported to Terezín and died of typhus. She survived the war in hiding. After the war, she joined the ruling Hungarian Communist Party.

Gimesné was a member of the Hungarian Psychoanalytic Association (Hungarian: Magyar Pszichoanalitikus Egyesület) [fr] from 1933 and succeeded Imre Hermann as president of the Association from 1947 until its forced dissolution in 1949 as part of a political campaign to discredit psychoanalysis. While president, she campaigned against the use of straitjackets and shock therapy. From 1949, Gimesné worked in a Budapest hospital.

From 1952, Gimesné worked at the National Institute of Psychiatry and Neurology (Hungarian: Országos Pszichiátriai és Neurológiai Intézet) [hu], also known as the Lipótmező. From 1954, she was director of the Institute. Under her leadership, the animal testing laboratory was established and biochemical research was expanded and reduced the use of insulin comas, water wraps, restraint bed, shock therapy and straitjackets in treatment. She directed the Institute for three years until her retirement in 1957. She was succeeded by Mária Béla [hu].

In 1956, Gimesné's daughter Judit emigrated to Switzerland. After the Hungarian Revolution of 1956, Gimesné's son Miklós Gimes, a journalist and revolutionary, was executed for treason in 1958, along with Imre Nagy and Pál Maléter.

After her passport request was refused for the third time, Gimesné died by suicide on 27 May 1960 in Budapest, Hungary.
