= Galileo Circle =

Former student organization

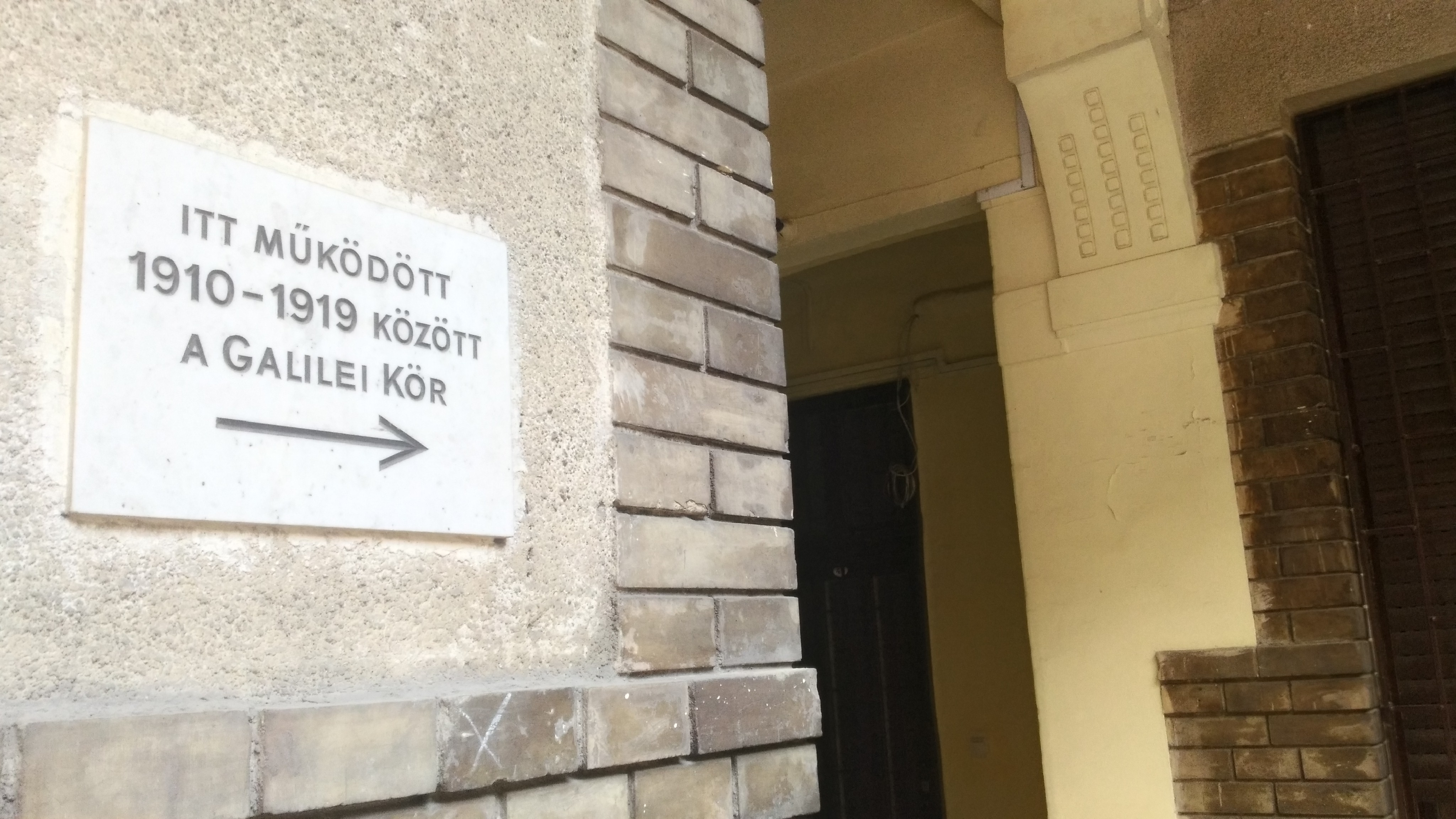
Sign commemorating the Galileo Circle in Anker Köz

The Galileo Circle (Galilei Kör) was an atheist-materialist student organization that functioned in Budapest between 1908 and 1919. Their center was located at the Anker Köz in Terézváros, Budapest. The circle had several subgroups with four different world views: the radical liberals (they called themselves as "radical democrats"), the Marxists (they called it as "Revolutionary Socialists"), the anarcho-syndicalists and the socialists (social democrats). However they had common goals, which included the protection of free scientific research and thinking at universities, the cultivation of social sciences, the social assistance of poor students, the spread of anti-clericalist and atheist views, the support of anti-nationalism and promoting internationalism, the propagation of anti-alcoholism, the opposition to large estates and the "reorientation of Hungarian social perception".

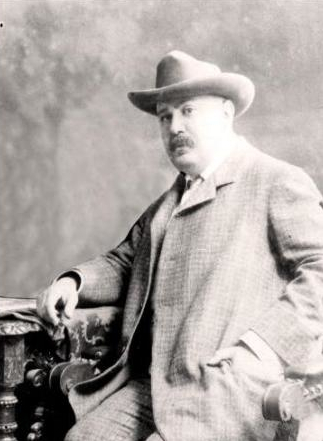
Gyula Pikler Professor of Law

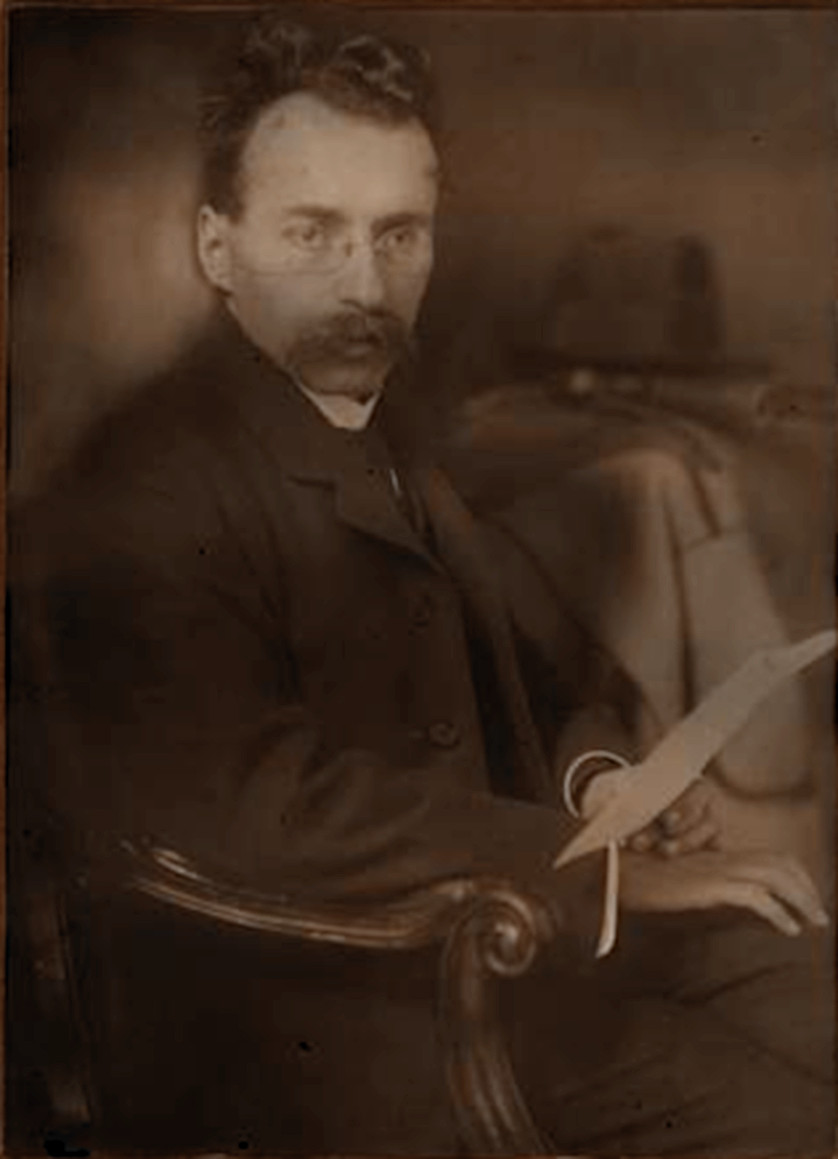
Ervin Szabó library director, anarchosyndicalist revolutionary, the Circle's spiritual leader

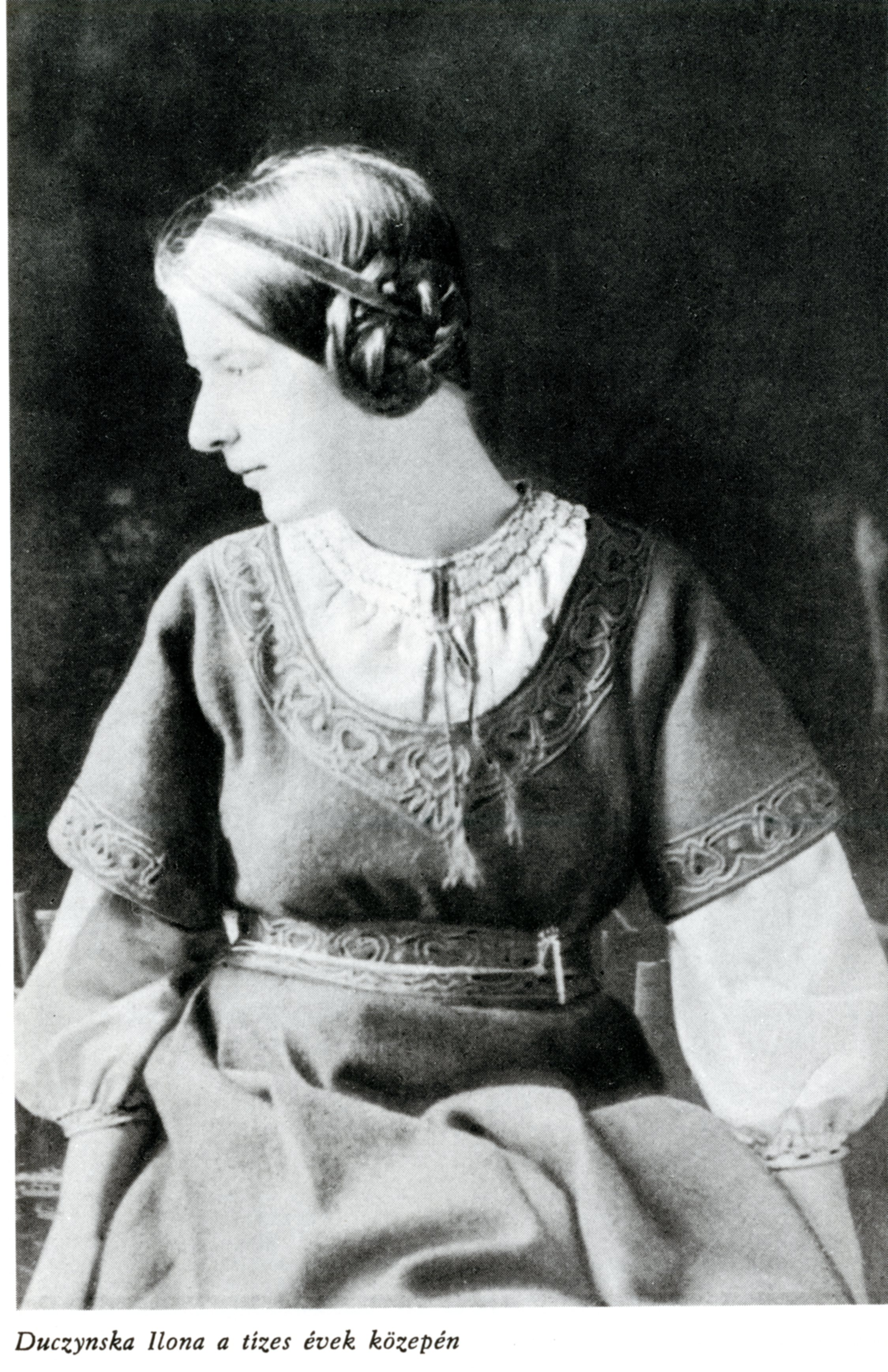
Ilona Duczyńska, who volunteered to shoot Pm. István Tisza in 1917.

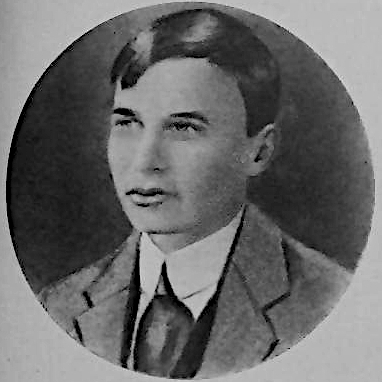
János Lékai Leitner a young member of the Galilei Circle, who unsuccessfully attempted to assassinate Prime Minister István Tisza on 17 October 1918 in front of the Parliament Gate IV

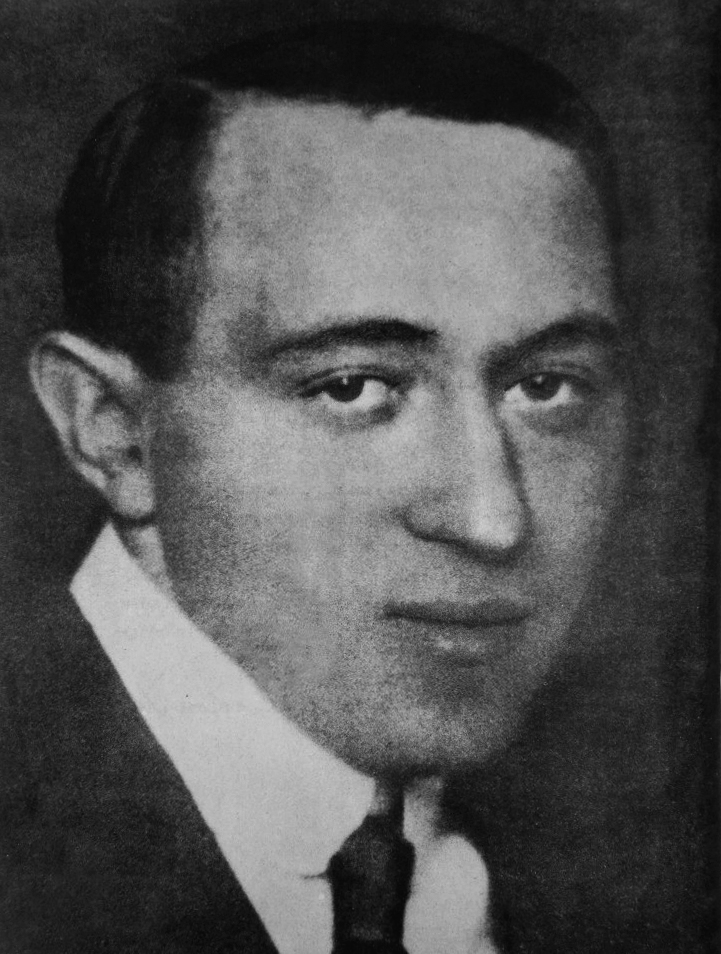
Mátyás Rákosi, who became later a communist dictator of Hungary (1948–1956)

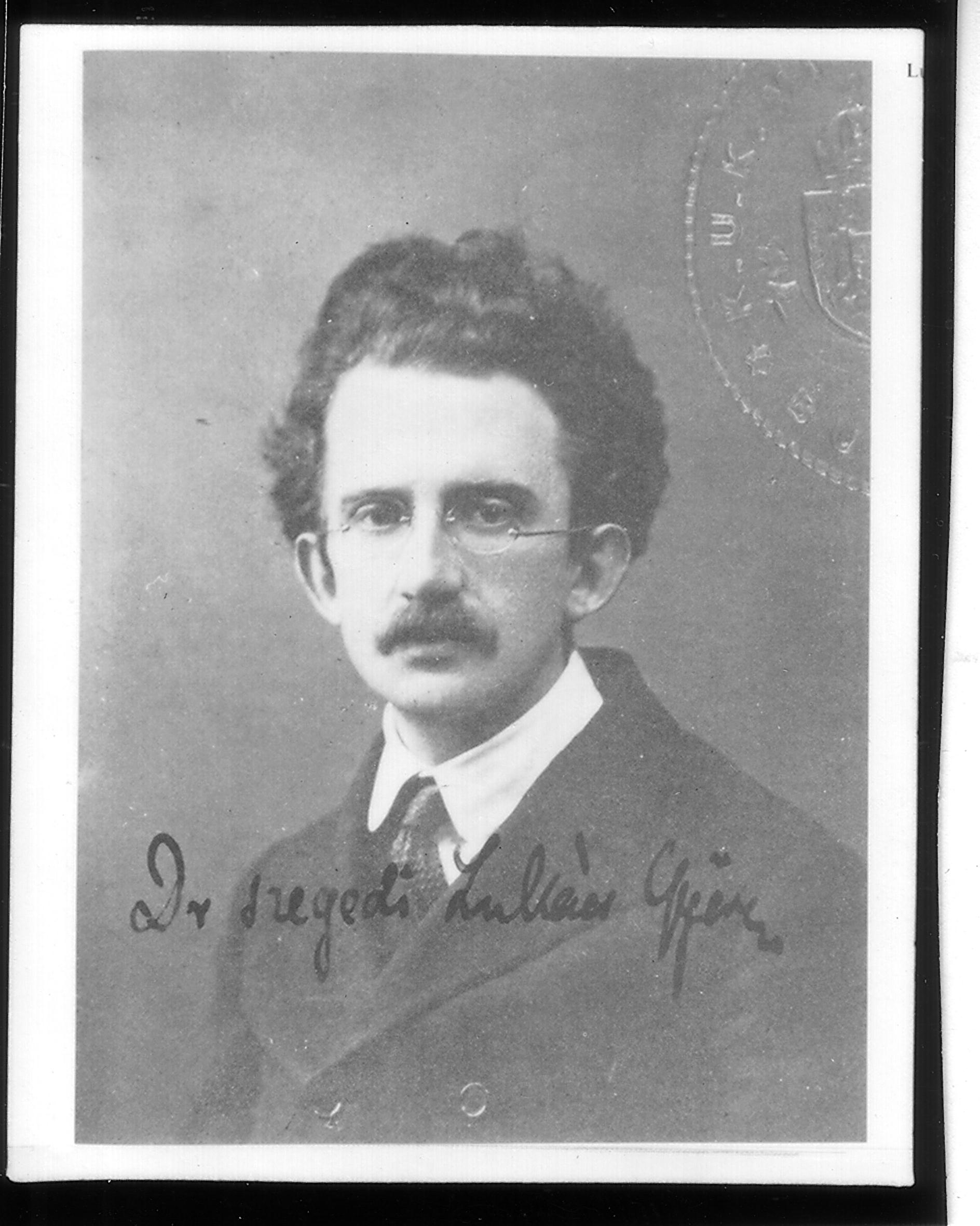
György Lukács

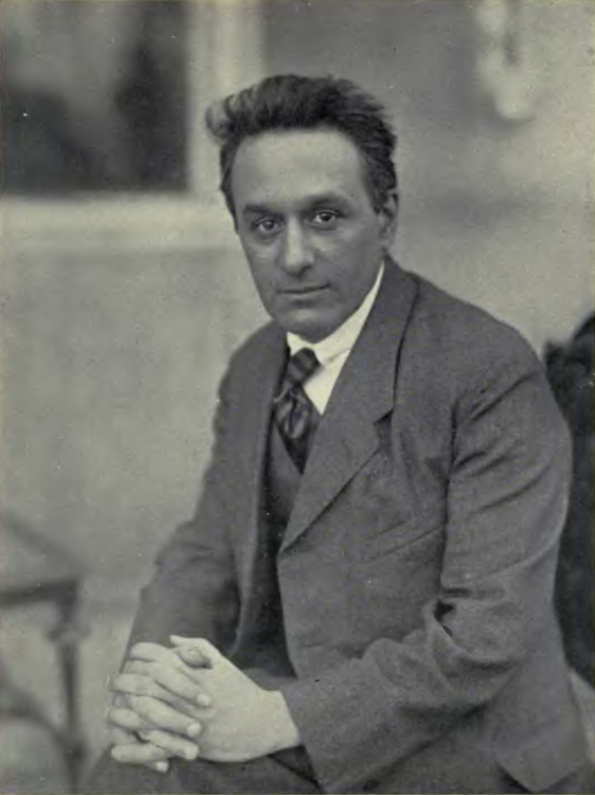
Zsigmond Kunfi

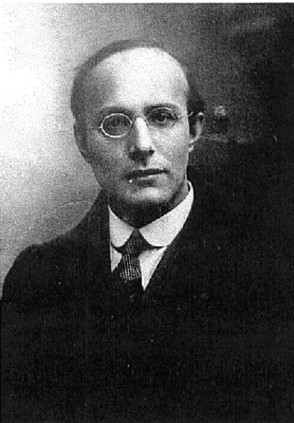
Karl Polanyi

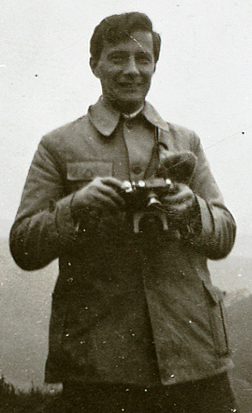
Michael Polanyi

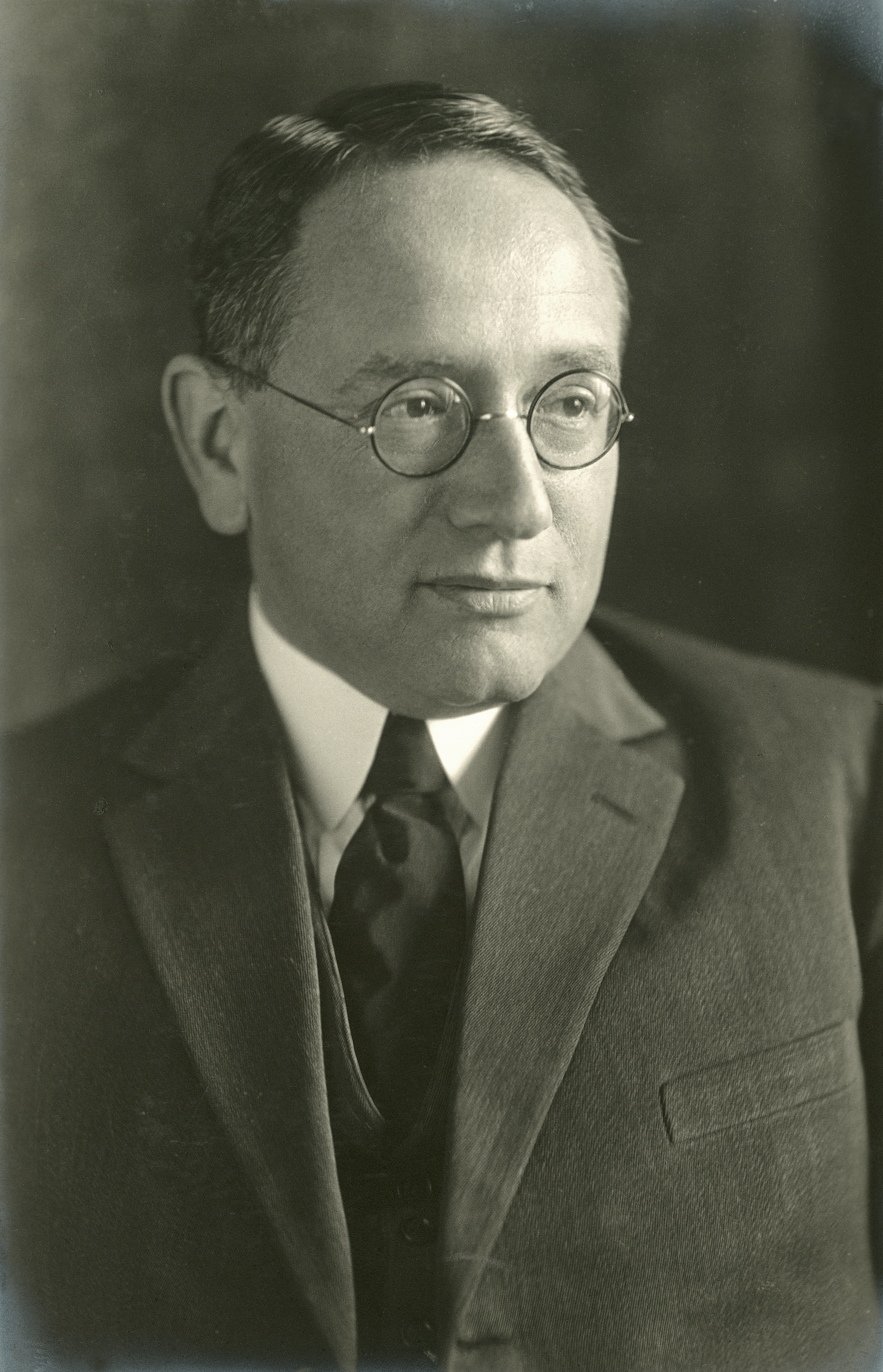
Georg Pólya

The circle was founded on 22 November 1908. This was in response to the attacks on Gyula Pikler, a social scientist who had suggested that the nation was a social phenomenon which arose through a social and historical process, rather than an eternal entity. This led to him being attacked by Hungarian Christian nationalists. It claimed to be specifically apolitical and declared itself in favour of self-education and science. Endre Ady described the galilesists as the 'young army of Fever', dedicating various poems to the Circle. Oszkár Jászi thought the galileists would help lead Hungary from 'the Balkans into Western Europe'.

The organisation was banned in January 1918, a period of labour unrest in the Austro-Hungarian Empire. However following the Aster Revolution in October 1918 it was relaunched. It was finally dissolved on 21 March, shortly following the establishment of the Hungarian Soviet Republic.

The circle published Szabadgondolat. The Sonntagskreis is often considered as a smaller successor organisation of Galileo Circle in Germany, but its membership required at least a finished university degree. However the Sonntagskreis preferred rather the membership of scholars.

In the interwar period, following the dissolution of the Circle, Hungarian conservative intellectuals criticised the Galileists for having instigated the Aster Revolution, their contribution in the disarmament of the Hungarian army when other nations started to claim large territories from Hungary, their activity led to the tragic events of the Hungarian Soviet Republic and for being responsible for the decisions of the Treaty of Trianon, which resulted in the loss of 70% of the pre-war territory of Hungary and 64% of the pre-WW1 era population.

== Earlier history: Kulturkampf at the universities ==
In Kingdom of Hungary, the universities were church-founded institutions from the Middle Ages until the last quarter of the 19th century. Initially, in the Middle Ages, the Catholic Church, then after the Reformation, the Protestant churches also founded their own universities. The state did not have any universities, with the exception of a military academy and a few engineering universities from the 18th century. A radical change that broke the monopoly of churches on the fields of humanities came at the last quarter of the 19th century, when one after another state-funded colleges and universities appeared. Despite the vehement protests of Catholic and Protestant church leaders of the country, these universities offered courses in the humanities, where the traditional religious philosophies were completely eclipsed. Referring to the autonomy of the universities, these new state-financed educational institutions also offered wide degree of freedom for the materialist and evolutionist worldviews. The churches, however, did not let go of their monopoly over the humanities, and began to organise religious students into communities to counter what they called "modern anti-Christian philosophical and moral views" in the state-financed public universities.

"My aim is to eradicate such petty notions as homeland and nation from your hearts."

— Lecture by Gyula Pikler, full professor of philosophy of law, 1901

The civic-radical currents that emerged at the beginning of the 20th century were a new phenomenon in both scientific and political life, as they tried to use the results of sociology and positivism, which were new at the time, to achieve their political and social goals.

The 'crucifix-fights' were about whether crucifixes could remain in state educational institutions after the separation of church and state at the end of the 19th century, and a provocative action in 1900 (a plaster crucifix was knocked down from a Holy Crown relief at the University of Budapest by unknown perpetrators) led to a "war of cultures" in the public life of the universities in Budapest. If we simplify what happened, the members of the Catholic St Imre Circle, founded in 1900, repeatedly placed crucifixes in demonstrative places during their 'crucifix actions', which were taken down by secularisationists; the former were mocked as 'the clericals', the latter were often mocked simply as 'the Jews', – because of their ethnic background -, and the opposing parties often hit each other, causing grievous bodily harms. During the 'Pikler riots' in the autumn of 1907, the phenomenon of campus violence reached its zenith. The focal point of the unrest was Gyula Pikler, a distinguished professor of philosophy of law at the university and the esteemed leader of the radical Social Science Society at that time. Pikler faced a vicious attack due to his intellectually stimulating theory. In direct contradiction to the prevailing notions of natural law during that era, Pikler advocated a perspective founded on an evolutionary-historical materialist framework. He argued that the origin of nations, states, and laws did not stem from a divine truth, but rather emerged as a response to human needs. Consequently, he posited that the structure of governance and legal systems ought to be molded in accordance with the economic and societal requirements and interests of the period, rather than adhering rigidly to tradition. Of all Pikler's statements, those concerning the nature of nations elicited the most vehement response. According to his views, nations, including the Hungarian nation, were not immutable entities. Instead, they arose in response to the demands of a particular era, when human needs necessitated forms of organization and association beyond those of tribes or clans. In alignment with this evolutionary logic, Pikler predicted that a time would come in the future when nations would be superseded by larger units and organizational structures, ultimately leading to the establishment of a global state—a long-awaited harbinger of enduring peace.

On 23 January 1901, intellectuals, mostly with lawyer / legal qualifications, founded the Hungarian Social Science Society, whose aim was sociology, social psychology and practical social policy. It was directed by social scientist Oszkár Jászi, professor of law Gyula Pikler, Bódog Somló student and Róbert Braun student. From 1904, the newspaper "Világ" was published for three years. The paper was self-described as "a popular scientific journal for freethinkers, atheists, materialists, monists, socialists, and labour movement activists". Oszkár Jászi's manifesto was published in 1907 under the title "'Towards the New Hungary'", in which he triumphantly proclaims that "The clericalized nationalism is in its final hours, and in the air cleansed by the knowledge of natural science, and the economic organization of the proletariat, the workers' democracy of the self-conscious peoples is growing and strengthening day by day". By this time, Jászi had already become the intellectual leader of Hungarian progressivism and bourgeois radicalism. From 1906 onwards, the Society for Social Sciences became more and more concerned with the topics of current actual political dialogue instead of their earlier theoretical centered questions, therefore they founded the Civic Radical Party in 1914.

== History ==
The Galileo Circle was founded around and under the influence of Gyula Pikler, atheist-evolutionist full professor of philosophy of law, in Budapest on 22 November 1908, and was joined by intellectuals, mainly of the extreme left-wing persuasion. The student circle was inspired by their ideological opponents: the national-Christian university and college associations, such as the Catholic St. Imre Circle, and the Protestant Gabriel Bethlen Circle and the Zionist students from the Maccabean Circle.

The right-wing university youth tried to discredit the professor by disrupting Pikler's lectures and by protesting. Professor Pikler's harassment became a political issue for the Christian right-wing parties that were forming at national level. From the student groups of the "progressive" left-wing university youth, organised in defence of the jurist professor, the Galilei Circle grew and was founded, with the support of the Hungarian Association of Free Thinkers, on 22 November 1908. Originally, the circle was to be named after Professor Pikler, however the professor suggested the name "Galileo Galilei", the hero of the "eppur si muove" metaphor, who stood up for the truth of science. "Because Galileo is perhaps the founder of modern science".

"The Galilei Circle, the League of Electoral Rights, the Reform Club, etc., are all creations of the radical Freemasonry, which already play a significant role in our difficult work of redefining Hungarian social perception. It is time to check the power of the clerical reaction. The religious university congregations will be counterbalanced in the future by free-spirited, modern-minded youth associations and boarding schools...

— Szalai Pál: Alkotó és romboló munka a szabadkőművességben, Budapest, 1911. György Károlyi book printing house

By the end of the first school year, 1908/1909, membership had reached nineteen hundred. Later, the number of members fluctuated between one thousand and one thousand and one hundred. The membership fee was one crown per semester.

In 1910, the students bought an apartment on the second floor of the building at Anker köz 2–4 for the purpose of organising discussion clubs, reading evenings and self-study circles in European and Hungarian legal history, philosophy, sociology and political science, and psychology. But soon the membership grew so much that the large apartment was not big enough for them, so Ervin Szabó – the director of the main library in Budapest – came to their help and offered several large reading rooms in the large library at certain regular times for the Galileo Circle's purposes. After that, the apartment served only as a central meeting place for the circle's organisers and leadership.

Ernst Mach had the greatest influence on the formation of the Galilean worldview in the natural sciences, which was built on the absolutization of the concept of experience ("We cannot even think about the phenomena that cannot be proven by experience," wrote young Polanyi). They were also the first promoters of the Works of Zigmund Freud in Hungary.

Mach's name shows that the Galivists were strongly cultivated by the strong cultivation of the natural sciences, among whom engineering and medical students were over-represented compared to the more traditional student associations usually dominated by legal students, historians and literary teachers.

They also organized workers' matinees, performing excerpts from the works of Gorky and Zola to blue-collar worker audiences, who they not only wanted to raise proletarian consciousness through their performances, but also to discourage workers' alcoholism through their anti-alcoholic propaganda. Not only for health reasons, but also because, they thought, they can't fight in the class struggle with alcoholic workers. In the early 1910s, the Galilei Circle also became more closely associated with the Hungarian Social Democratic Party, and by taking part in the organized demonstration for general suffrage on 23 May 1912, thus their circle had given up its previously proclaimed apolitical position.

The first president of the circle was Károly Polányi, who also edited the circle's journal, "Szabadgondolat" (Free Thought). The journal Szabadgondolat regularly published articles by the famous poet Endre Ady. "The Galilei Circle, I am sorry, when it was formed, perhaps did not even suspect that it was undertaking such a grandiose task, compared to which even the Russian student youth might find consolation or sick despair", he wrote enthusiastically in November 1913.

The organisation was still striving for apoliticalism, but it was supported by the organisations of the progressive bourgeois intelligentsia, some leaders of the Hungarian Social Democratic Party and Ervin Szabó, the most outstanding Hungarian expert on Marxism, who had already left the Social Democratic Party. Ervin Szabó was convinced that a profound transformation of the Hungarian social order could not be achieved through the traditional parliamentary elections due to the limited suffrage.

At one time, (as members of revolutionary socialist branch of the circle), the young Mátyás Rákosi, Ottó Korvin and József Pogány were also secretaries of the circle. One of its founders was György Lukács philosopher, later deputy People's Commissar for Public Education in the Hungarian Soviet Republic. The president and leading personalities of the student association were László Rubin, Sándor Turnowsky, László Gyulai, Zsigmond Kende, Artúr Dukesz. At the association's celebrations, the famous poet Endre Ady would sometimes speak, recite and praised the "fierce but never ordinary, spiritual but militant solidarity" between the members of the circle. A member and popular lecturer of the Galilei Circle was Oszkár Faber, who was the chairman of the National Religious Liquidation Committee during the Hungarian Soviet Republic after the World War.

=== WW I ===
The Circle wanted to achieve the world peace "as soon as possible". During the First World War, the Galileo Circle conducted anti-war propaganda from 1915, initially in the form of pacifist lectures, and later another hardcore group of the circle (see Revolutionary Socialists) also started illegal activities. From 1916 onwards, anti-war propaganda activities (lectures and the production of anti-war leaflets, reinforcement of defeatism) took on a new colour. After U.S. Entry into World War I on the side of the Allies, nobody had doubt that the WW1 will end with the victory of Entente. To prevent the human distress caused by the war and to shorten the war, they decided to continue their activities in support of the Allied forces. Thus a majority view was adopted that an end to the war would be desirable with a quicker Entente victory, ending in the complete defeat of the Central Powers. They were no longer content to talk only about the horrors and economic effects of war, but also encouraged military rebellion against the governments of the Central Powers.

From September 1917, Szabó arranged regular meetings with members of the Galileo Circle and Ilona Duczyńska, during which they decided on the publication of a manifesto based on the line of the Zimmerwald movement and organized a street demonstration against the war, which led many more activists to join the group. On 17 November, the group led the country's first anti-war demonstration, calling for "Peace or Revolution" before eventually being broken up by police. But despite the attempts at repression, this action ignited many more demonstrations throughout the country, organized independently by a variety of different groups. On 26 December, syndicalists in Budapest even established the country's first workers' council to coordinate a general strike against the war.

Pamphlets in German, Hungarian, Slovak, and Croatian languages had already reached military units fighting on the Russian and Italian fronts. The Revolutionary Socialists included Ilona Duczyńska, Tivadar Sugár, Miklós Sisa, Árpád Haász and others, initially led by Jolán Kelen, who in the autumn of 1917, under the intellectual leadership of Ervin Szabó, the library director, reproduced and distributed anti-war leaflets. The anti-militarist activities of the Galilei Circle culminated in the actions of the Duczyńska-Sugar group. Duczyńska with her radical youth group spread propaganda among the munitions workers and then in the armed forces. on 1918, the 6th infantry regiment of Újvidék at Pécs refused to go to the trenches. In 1917, incited by Ervin Szabó, Ilona Duczyńska volunteered to shoot the Hungarian prime minister István Tisza with a pistol. During a search and investigation in the Galilei Circle, the police obtained information that led to an investigation against the leadership of the Galilei Circle for distributing the pamphlet "Our Brothers in the Army". In January 1918, several members of the group, the leaders of the circle, were arrested on charges of editing and distributing pamphlets, and the club premises of the Galilei Circle were closed. In the Galileo trial, which ended at the end of September 1918, the main defendants Ilona Duczyńska and Tivadar Sugár were sentenced to two and three years in prison respectively. János Lékai poet and the leftist circles saw the number one war criminal in the person of Prime Minister István Tisza who was shot on 16 October 1918 by the fanatic and lung-cancer-stricken (and therefore even determined to die) 23-year-old Lékai, a member of the Galilei Circle and Ottó Korvin's anti-militarist movement, but his gun jammed and Tisza escaped. Two weeks after Lékai's assassination attempt, however, a terrorist group was more successful and István Tisza was killed on 31 October 1918. The press of the Entente powers considered him the third most important man in the central powers and the "most hated ideological enemy" in 1918. The freethinkers thus achieved their goal: the prime minister was dead. Kéri Pál, the mastermind of the assassination attempt on Tisza, who according to some witnesses at the Tisza trial, took out his watch at around 4 p.m. on the day of the assassination and declared: Tisza will be dead in an hour and a half.

==== Lectures of the Galileo Circle during the WW I ====
In the period between 1914 and 1918, two series of lectures on the First World War were integrated into the lecture series of various "free education" institutions in Hungary (e.g. the Erzsébet People's Academy).

In November 1915, the Galilei Circle launched a series of lectures entitled Social Problems after the War, to which bourgeois radical and social democratic intellectuals of the Social Science Society were invited to give lectures. In November and December,

- Zoltán Rónai: National Culture and International Culture,
- Jenő Varga: Economic Problems after the War,
- Károly Szalay: War and Pedagogy,
- Gyula J. Pikler: Customs Union,
- Ottó Bernáth: Currency Issues after the War,
- Ernő Garami: The Internationalism after the War,
- Zsigmond Kunfi: The Tasks of Socialism after the War,
- Miklós Berend: Child Protection after the War,
- Pál Zádor: Social Policy after the War,
- Pál Szende: Tax Issues after the War

were held in the large hall of the Social Sciences Society.

Reports of the lectures by Kunfi, Szende and Pál Zádor have been preserved.

== Post WW1 period ==
=== Contribution in the Aster Revolution ===
At the Budapest Library, the director Ervin Szabó trained and educated an expert librarian-guard. Although he died on 30 September 1918, his colleagues, László Dienes, Béla Kőhalmi, Blanka Pikler bibliographer, Róbert Braun sociologist, József Madzsar physician and natural scientist continued his work until his downfall. The Library of the Capital of Hungary took Ervin Szabó's name in 1946, which remained after the regime change.

In January 1919, a member of the Galileo Circle stood guard of honour next to the coffin of the poet Endre Ady, which was buried in the central hall of the National Museum.

The Galileo Circle was reopened at the end of October 1918, during the Aster Revolution.

"The spirit of revolution had penetrated into every sphere of human relations

in the course of September and October. Men lost all interest in everyday affairs
and were looking fixedly into the future. ... An electrician's apprentice, come to
repair the wires, prophesied that we were on the threshold of revolution and
appalling events. The maid bringing in the soup told us that she had it from her
relatives in the country that the old world would last very little longer now.
The young men of the Galileo Club pursued their anti-militarist propaganda almost
openly, and the imprisonment of a few of them only increased their revolutionary enthusiasm.
Soldiers and even officers spoke aloud in public about the collapse of the [Italian] front.

In the tram one heard passionate outbursts against the war, the authorities and the propertied classes.

— Oszkár Jászi, 1924, p. 24

=== Hungarian Soviet Republic ===
The ideological tensions within the groups of Galilei Circle intensified even further when the Hungarian Soviet Republic was proclaimed in Budapest. As soon as the Hungarian Soviet Republic was declared by the communists, many of the members of the radical leftist groups (revolutionary socialists) in the Galilei Circle immediately received governmental and administrative positions as public commissioners, deputy public commissioners and public security functionaries. Meanwhile, those groups in the Galilei Circle who remained steadfast in their commitment to liberal and democratic values, immediately fled to Austria, thus expressing their dissent against the existence of the communist regime based on one-party system and dictatorship.

After the fall of the Soviet Republic, the organization was dissolved by the police of the new Horthy regime, all its documents were confiscated, and the door of its headquarter was sealed by the police. Many of its members emigrated and most found refuge in Vienna. Oszkár Jászi arrived in Vienna on 1 May. A few weeks later he was followed by Pál Szende, Károly Polányi, and many others from the collective of the banned journal Huszadik Század ("Twentieth Century ") and the dissolved Galilei Circle, including József Rédei, Arnold Dániel, Sándor Fazekas, Ernő Lorsy, József Madzsar, László Fényes and Pál Kéri.

== Speakers at the Galileo Circle ==
- Wilhelm Ostwald (1912),
- Villem Ernits,
- Mihály Babits,
- Béla Balázs,
- Frigyes Karinthy,
- Tivadar Sugár,
- Károly Polányi

== Book review seminars in 1916–1917 ==
Works of

- Karl Liebknecht,
- Norman Angell,
- George Bernard Shaw,
- Jean Jaurès,
- Gustave Hervé.

== Notable members ==
The participants included:

- Sándor Barta
- Therese Benedek
- Ștefan Foriș
- Lili Hajdú Gimesné
- Irén Júlia Götz
- Ottó Korvin
- Karl Mannheim
- Karl Polányi
- György Lukács
- Michael Polanyi
- György Pólya
- Mátyás Rákosi
- József Révai
- Zsigmond Kunfi
- Jenő Varga
