= Irén Júlia Götz =

Hungarian chemist (1889–1940)

- Götz Irén Júlia
- Born: 3 April 1889; Magyaróvár, Hungary
- Died: 24 December 1941 (aged 52); Ufa, Soviet Union
- Education: University of Budapest
- Spouse: László Dienes
- Scientific career
- Fields: Chemistry
- Workplaces: Nitrogen Research Institute

Irén Júlia Götz (Hungarian: Götz Irén Júlia;) (3 April 1889 – 24 December 1941) was a Hungarian chemist, and university lecturer. Götz was the first woman to teach at a Hungarian university. She spent the academic year 1911–1912 as a student at Marie Curie's Radium Institute.

== Early life and education ==
After completing her secondary studies in her hometown and in Budapest, she enrolled in 1907 at the University of Budapest, where, in addition to lectures in mathematics, physics, and chemistry, she also attended courses in philosophy. From its founding in 1908, she was an active member of the radical students' Galilei Circle, where she met her future husband, the sociologist László Dienes. They married in 1913 and had three daughters together.

In 1909 she earned her doctorate in chemistry summa cum laude. Her outstanding talent was recognised with a scholarship that allowed her to study during the 1911–1912 academic year in Marie Curie's Radium Institute laboratory in Paris. She was however unable to spend very much time with Curie who was suffering from various illnesses and could not spend much time at the institute.

== Career ==
She was unable to continue her research upon returning to Hungary, but she found a position at the Experimental Station for Animal Physiology and Nutrition, directed by Ferenc Tangl, where from 1915 she served as an unpaid assistant chemist. She was officially confirmed in this position in 1918. On 28 January 1919 she presented the results of her theoretical research before the Hungarian Academy of Sciences. Her high level of expertise was acknowledged by the Hungarian Soviet Republic, which, by decree of 10 April 1919, appointed her as a lecturer of theoretical chemistry at the University of Budapest, making her the first woman to teach at a Hungarian university. Dienes was a founding member of the Hungarian Communist Party. As a result, after the fall of the Hungarian Soviet Republic in 1919, the couple could no longer live in Hungary.

Pregnant at the time, Irén Götz went into hiding but was discovered and imprisoned in Mosonmagyaróvár. After three months, her colleagues' efforts secured her release, and she escaped to Vienna to join her husband. From there, they moved to Romania. Following a brief stay in Bucharest, they relocated to Cluj (Kolozsvár) at the end of 1921. There, beginning in the 1922–1923 academic year, she first lectured on food chemistry, then served as assistant and later as associate professor at the Pharmaceutical Institute, eventually earning the title of Doctor of Physical Sciences (1927–1928). Beginning in 1920, she edited the Bukaresti Hírlap (Bucharest Journal) with György Bölöni. Starting in 1922 she served as a lecturer at the Pharmaceutical Institute in Cluj (then Kolozsvár), and from 1925 she worked as an adjunct professor at the university's medical faculty.

Due to the shifting political climate in Romania, the Dienes family was again forced to flee in late 1928, this time moving to Berlin. Götz worked as an advisor to the Soviet Union's trade delegation in 1931. Because of attacks by the Nazi press, she could not continue this work, and the family moved to the Soviet Union. From 1931 to 1938, she was head of a scientific department at the Nitrogen Research Institute in Moscow, after which she was transferred to teach at a high school. In 1941 she was arrested on fabricated charges, and although she was soon released, she died of typhus contracted in prison at the end of that year.

== Scientific contributions ==
Her scientific work is known only in fragments, mainly from the early part of her career. In her doctoral dissertation, based on Ernest Rutherford's theory, she refined the measurement methods developed by Curie and her colleagues, expressing them in proper mathematical form. In Paris, she worked on the β-radiation of radium. Between 1912 and 1919, she published with Gyula Gróh in the fields of animal nutrition and physical chemistry. A significant result from this period was her 1918 paper submitted to Zeitschrift für Physikalische Chemie, in which she extended the Tamman law to the behaviour of liquid solutions. The only surviving written record of her research in Cluj shows that she continued this line of investigation, studying the diffusion of molecules and ions in solutions and their behaviour in other substances. Her positivist philosophy of science can be inferred from a 1921 essay. During her years in Budapest, the Hungarian Chemical Journal published her works On the Quantitative Determination of Radium Emanation (her doctoral dissertation, 1911), On the Stalagometric Measurement of Small Hydroxyl-Ion Concentrations (with Gyula Gróh, 1914), and On the Causes of Volume Changes Occurring When Mixing Liquids (1919).

== Personal life ==
In 1913, Götz married László Dienes, a Hungarian sociologist, essayist, librarian and university professor. They had three daughters, Klára, Mary and Irene. The family had to flee Hungary due to her husband's political activities.

== See also ==
- List of women associated with Marie Curie and Irène Joliot-Curie
