= Miklós Gimes =

Hungarian revolutionary 1917-1958

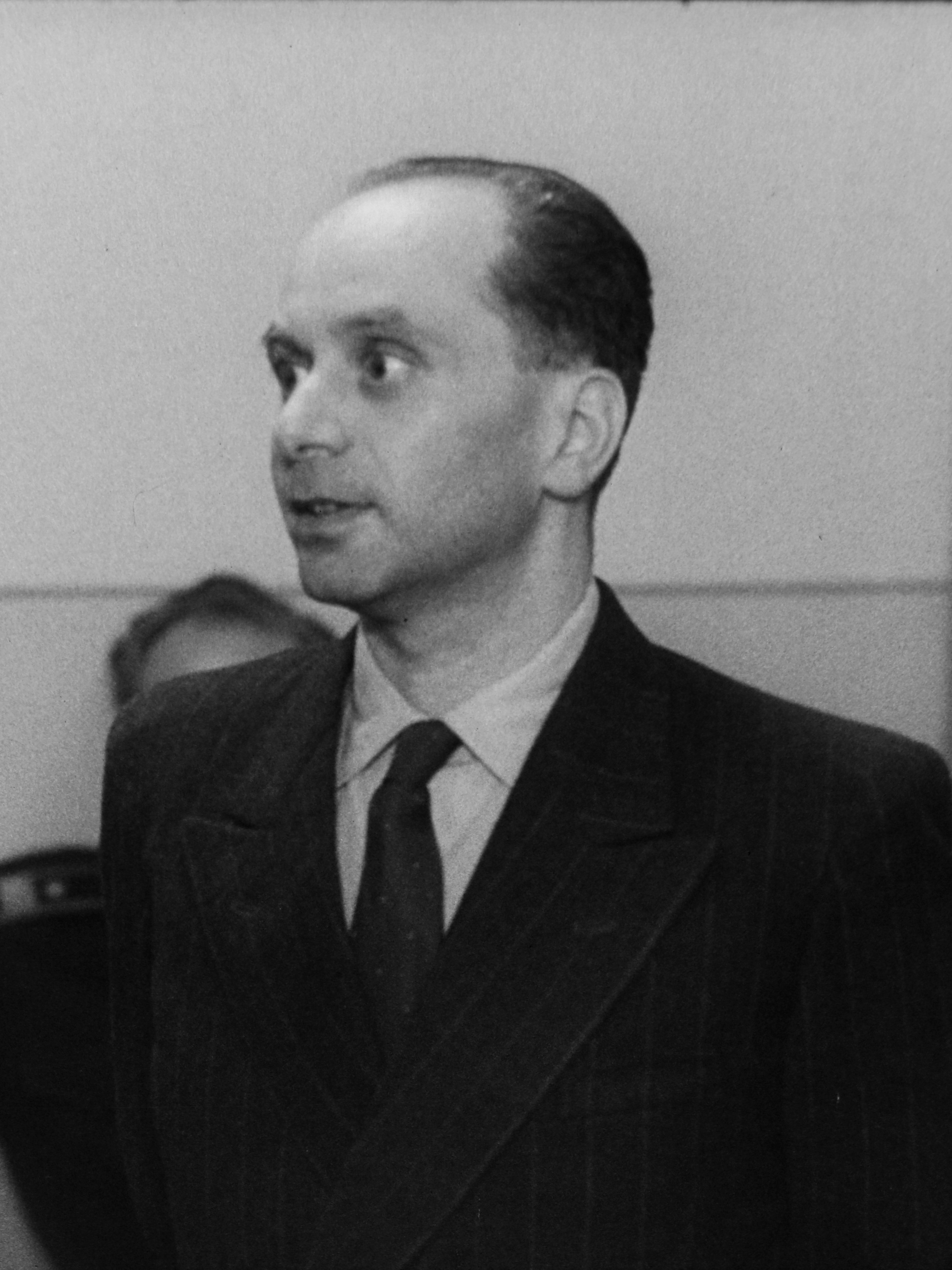
The interrogation of Gimes during the 1958 trial

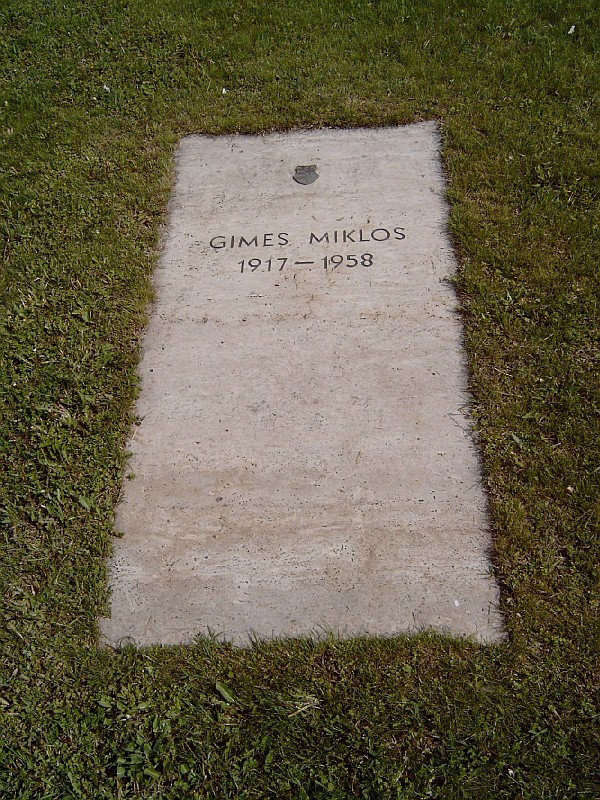

Miklós Gimes (23 December 1917 in Budapest – 16 June 1958) was a Hungarian journalist and politician, notable for his role in the Hungarian Revolution of 1956. He was executed along with Imre Nagy and Pál Maléter in 1958 for treason.

His parents were Hungarian Jews, psychiatrists, converts to the Unitarian faith, his mother, Lilly Hajdu was a physician, president of the Hungarian Psychoanalytical Association from 1947 until its forced dissolution in 1949. Gimes became involved in the Hungarian communist movement in 1942, and worked as a journalist in various communist newspapers. In 1955, he was expelled from the Hungarian Working People's Party for calling for the rehabilitation of László Rajk. As a political friend of Imre Nagy, his membership was reinstated in 1956.

During the revolution, Gimes was heavily involved in both politics and revolutionary journalism. He founded and edited a newspaper along with other revolutionaries, Magyar Szabadság. He stood by the revolution even after the Soviet invasion, founding the Hungarian Democratic Independence Movement.

On 5 December, Gimes was arrested and brought to trial. After a year and a half, he was sentenced to death by the Supreme Court. The execution was carried out on 16 June 1958, when he was aged forty.
