= Ervin Szabó =

Hungarian anarchist and librarian (1877–1918)

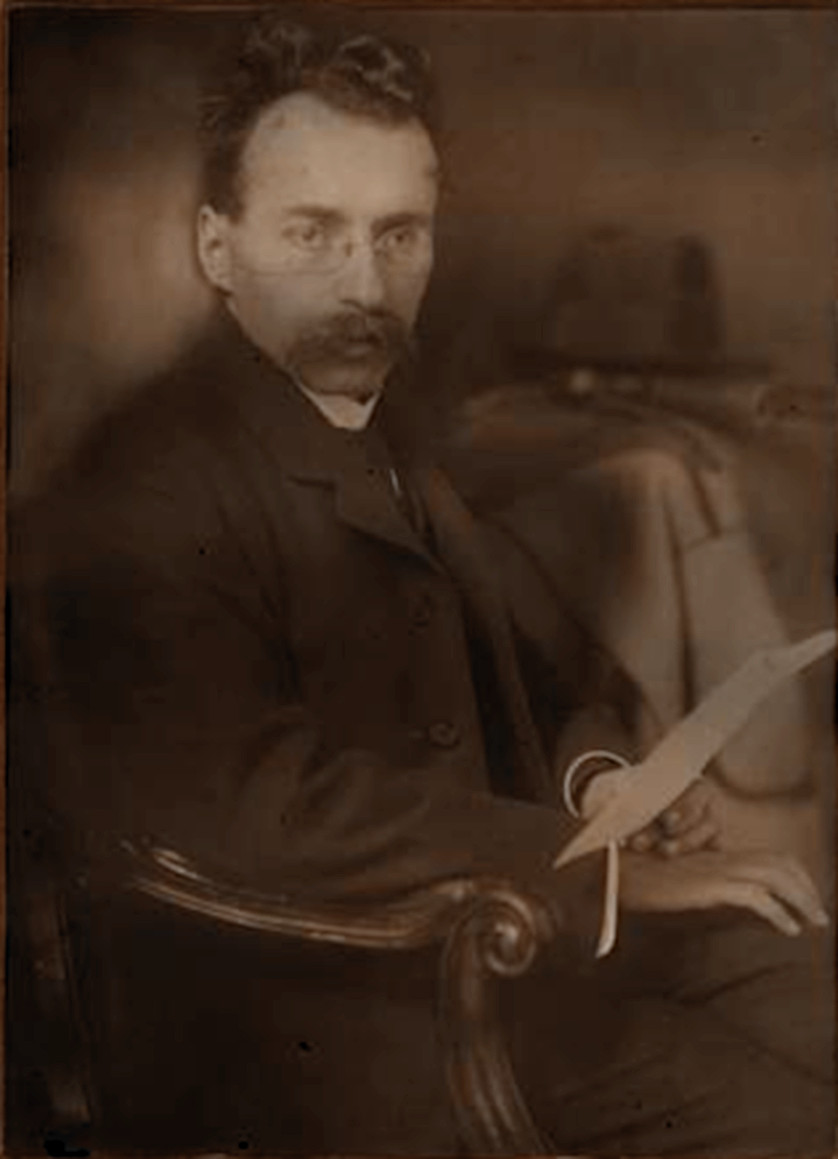
Ervin Szabó

Ervin Szabó (Hungarian: [ˈɛrvin ˈsɒboː]; born as Samuel Armin Schlesinger; 23 August 1877 – 29 September 1918) was a Hungarian social scientist, librarian and anarcho-syndicalist revolutionary.

== Life ==
Born Ármin Sámuel Schlesinger in Szlanica, Kingdom of Hungary, Austria-Hungary (now part of Námestovo, Slovakia), Szabó's parents were assimilationist Jews from Árva County. He studied law at the University of Vienna, where he completed his doctorate in 1899. and wrote for Népszava, a Social-democratic newspaper. In 1911, he became director of Budapest's Metropolitan Library, modelling it after the British public library system. The library was purged of communists including Szabo's supporters on the library staff like Blanka Pikler.

He advanced academically, becoming the vice-president of the Hungarian Association of Social Science (Társadalomtudományi Társaság) in 1906.

After 1905, he began to move away from social democracy towards revolutionary syndicalism, and translated the work of Karl Marx and Friedrich Engels into Hungarian. He wrote articles for socialist journals Die Neue Zeit and Le Mouvement socialiste. He became associates with Georges Sorel, Karl Kautsky, Franz Mehring, Georgi Plekhanov, and later, with Hubert Lagardelle. He became a leader of the Hungarian anti-war movement during the First World War.

He died in Budapest.

The Metropolitan Ervin Szabó Library is named after him.

== See also ==
- Anarchism in Hungary
