= Metropolitan Ervin Szabó Library =

Library in Budapest, Hungary

Coordinates: 47°29′21.76″N 19°3′53.28″E

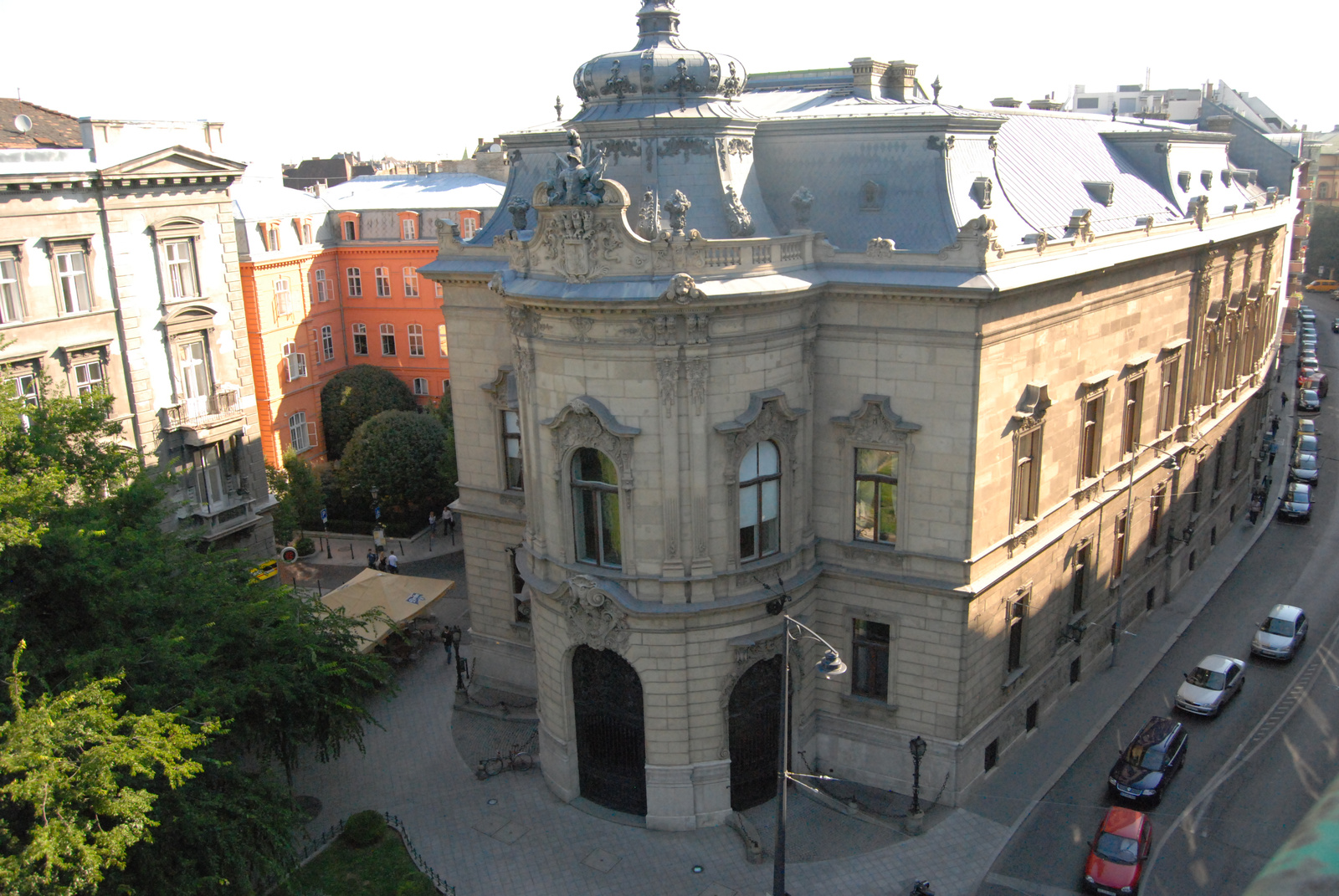
Metropolitan Ervin Szabó Library

Fővárosi Szabó Ervin Könyvtár (literally Metropolitan Ervin Szabó Library) is the largest library network in Budapest, Hungary.

The library was founded in 1904 and was first housed in the Central Town Hall in the inner city. Its central library is in the Wenckheim Palace, which Artúr Meinig designed for Count Frigyes Wenckheim in a mainly neo-Baroque style with some neo-Renaissance elements. The palace was completed in 1889. The city bought it for the library in 1927, and after four years of conversion the library opened there on 21 April 1931.

In 1997 the city decided to keep the palace, restore it and add new wings. The reconstruction, designed by Péter Hegedűs, began in 1998, and the completed complex was handed over to readers on 12 September 2001. It has a floor area of 13,000 m^{2}, seats 1,000 readers and holds more than 1.1 million volumes, the largest public book collection in Budapest. The palace's ceremonial rooms include the glass-roofed Imperial Staircase, the Golden and Silver Salons, two ballrooms and a mirrored corridor, and can host events; the former Baroque courtyard is now a glass-roofed atrium.

In 2003, the International Real Estate Federation awarded the Prix d’Excellence to its central building.

== See also ==
- Ervin Szabó
- List of libraries in Hungary
