= Bama =

Bama or BAMA may refer to:

== Places ==
- Bama, shortened form of Alabama, a state of the United States of America
  - The University of Alabama, a public university serving the state, often known as simply Bama
- Bama, one of the colloquial Burmese names of Myanmar
- Bama, Nigeria, Nigeria, a Local Government Area of Borno State
- Bama, Burkina Faso, a town in Banwa Province, Burkina Faso
- Bama Department, Houet Province, Burkina Faso
- Bama, New South Wales, a parish in Cadell County in New South Wales, Australia
- Bama Yao Autonomous County, Guangxi, China
  - Bama Town, Guangxi, seat of Bama County
- Boston-Atlanta Metropolitan Axis, colloquially known as "The Sprawl", a fictional near-future urban agglomeration in William Gibson's Sprawl trilogy

== People ==
- Bama (writer) (born 1958), Indian Tamil author
- James Bama (1926–2022), American artist
- Momodu Bama (died 2013), Nigerian member of Boko Haram
- Bama Rowell (1916–1993), American baseball player

== Other uses ==
- Bama (band), an American pop group
- Bama (soil), the official state soil of Alabama
- Bama Gruppen, Norwegian food wholesaler
- British Aerosol Manufacturers' Association
- Bundesarchiv-Militärarchiv, abbreviated BAMA
- Bama (fly), a signal fly, described by David McAlpine, 2001, in the family Platystomatidae (Diptera)
- BAMA (organization), Black Archives of Mid-America
- Satyabhama, a wife of the Hindu god Krishna

== See also ==
- Bhama (disambiguation)
- Bama Vijayam (disambiguation)
