= Karamba Diaby =

German politician

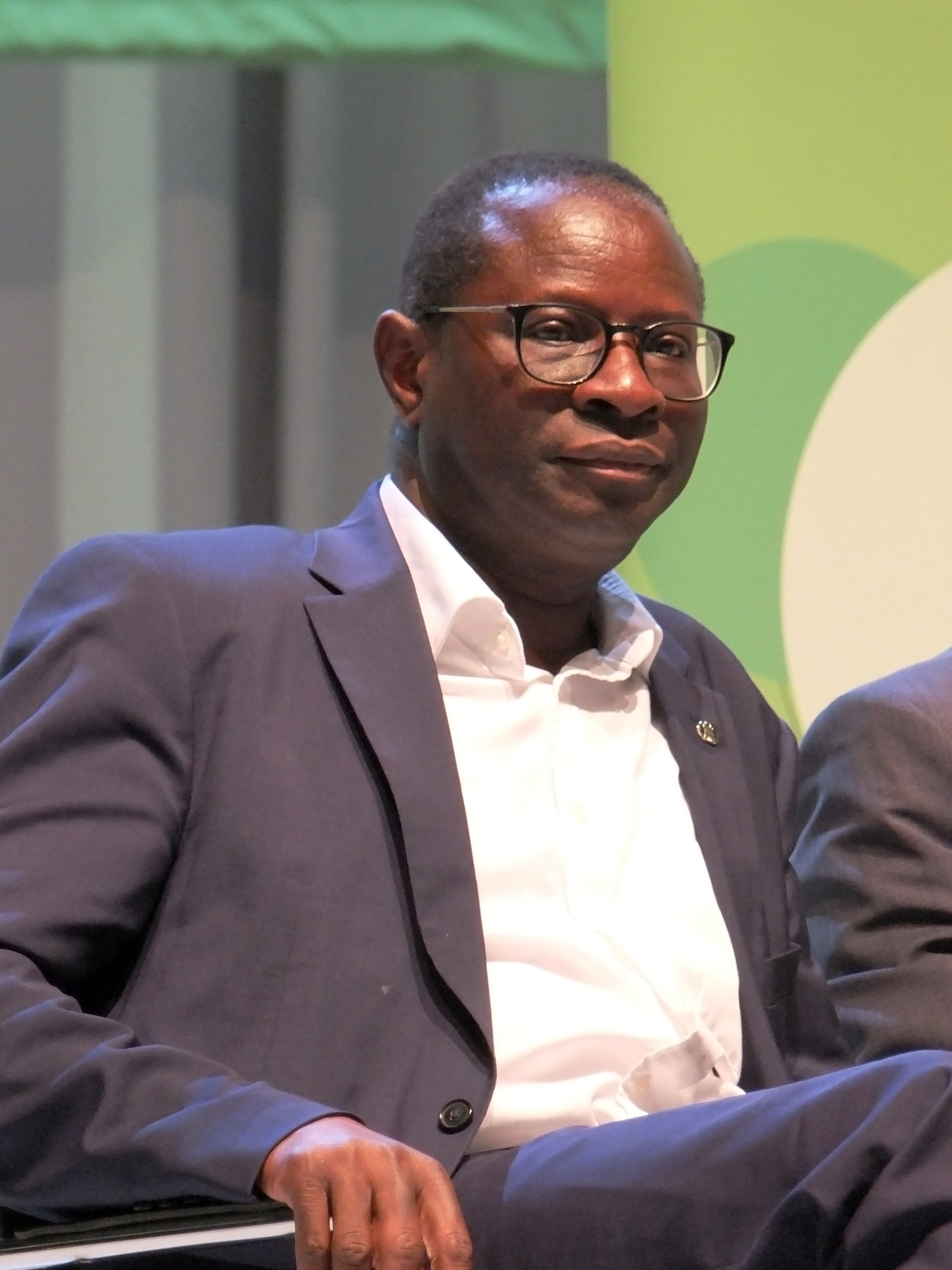

Member of the Bundestag
- In office 2013–2025
- Constituency: Halle

Personal details
- Born: 27 November 1961 (age 64) Marsassoum, Senegal
- Party: German: Social Democratic Party; EU: Party of European Socialists
- Education: Cheikh Anta Diop University; Martin Luther University of Halle-Wittenberg

Karamba Diaby (born 27 November 1961) is a Senegalese-born German chemist and politician of the Social Democratic Party who served as a member of the Bundestag from the 2013 elections to 2025 elections.

== Early life and education ==
Diaby grew up in Marsassoum, Senegal. The youngest of four children, he was raised by his sister after losing both of his parents by the time he was 7. A graduate of the Cheikh Anta Diop University, he left Senegal to study chemistry in East Germany and received his diploma in 1991. In 1996 he received his Doctor of Natural Science degree, and stayed after the reunification of Germany, after which he became more involved in political and social activism.

== Member of Parliament ==
=== 2013 election ===
On September 22, 2013, Diaby was elected to the Bundestag as a Social Democratic Party candidate from Halle (Saale), Saxony-Anhalt; Diaby became one of the first two Bundestag members of African ancestry, alongside Charles M. Huber (born to a Senegalese father and German mother), who was elected at the same time from the Christian Democratic Union.

=== Tenure ===
Diaby currently serves as deputy chairman of the Committee on Human Rights and Humanitarian Aid and as full member of the Committee on Education, Research and Technology Assessment. On the latter, he is his parliamentary group's rapporteur on matters related to the Academy of Sciences Leopoldina, the Alexander von Humboldt Foundation and the recognition of your foreign qualifications. Within his parliamentary group, he is a member of the working group on municipal policy. He also belongs to the Parliamentary Left, a left-wing movement.

Diaby's office in Halle was shot at on 15 January 2020. The attack was condemned by Heiko Maas, Germany's Foreign Minister, as "disgusting and cowardly".

==== Foreign affairs ====
In addition to his committee assignments, Diaby is the deputy chairman of the Parliamentary Friendship Group for Relations with the Francophone States of West and Central Africa (Equatorial Guinea, Benin, Burkina Faso, Ivory Coast, Gabon, Guinea, Cameroon, Republic of the Congo, Mali, Niger, Senegal, Togo, Chad, Central African Republic).

Since 2019, he has been a member of the German delegation to the Franco-German Parliamentary Assembly. He is also part of the Elie Wiesel Network of Parliamentarians for the Prevention of Genocide and Mass Atrocities and against Genocide Denial. In 2020, he co-founded a cross-party working group on diversity and antiracism.

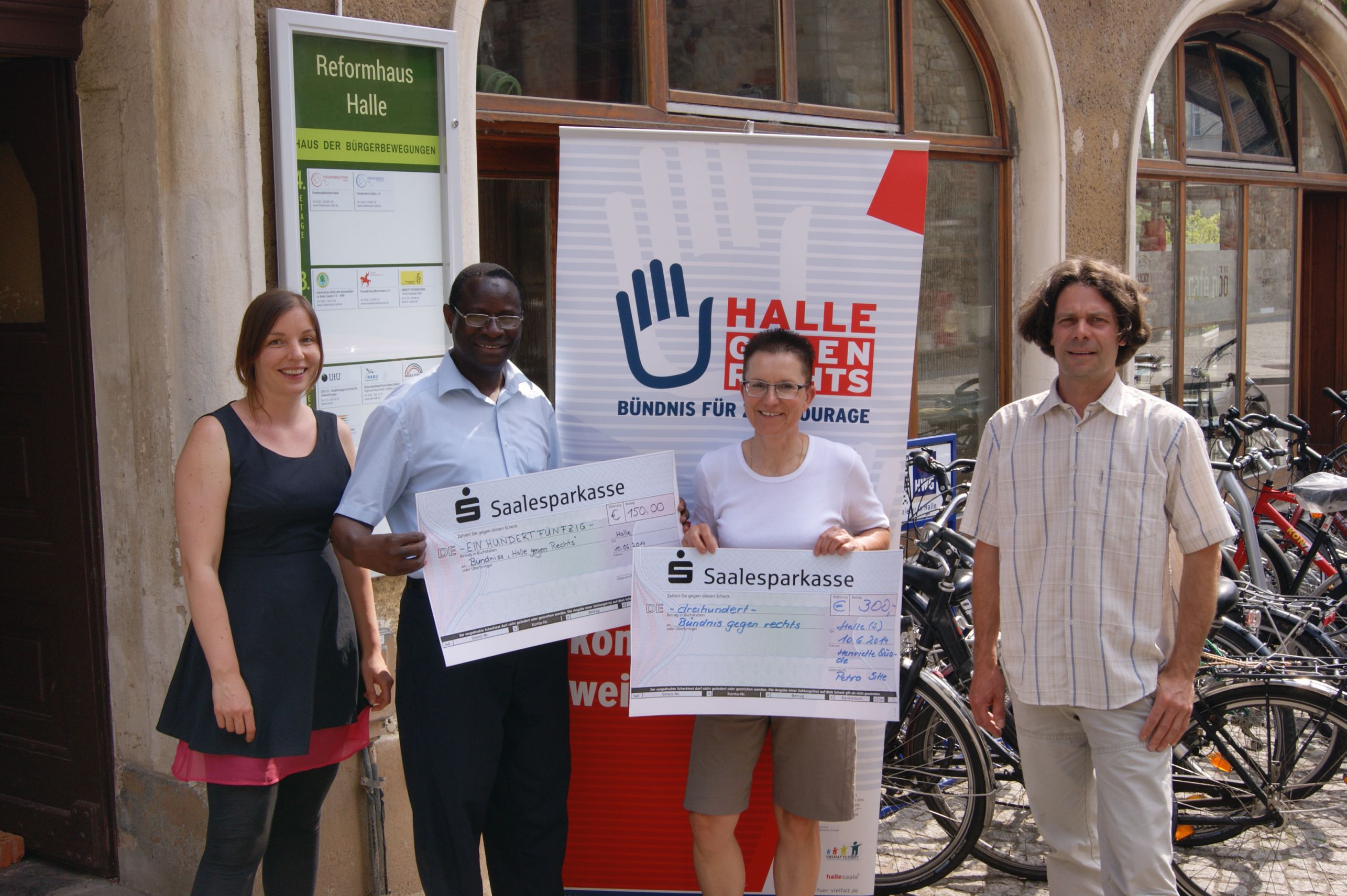
Diaby in Halle, June 2014.

==== 2017 coalition agreement ====
In the negotiations to form a fourth coalition government under Chancellor Angela Merkel following the 2017 federal elections, Diaby was part of the working group on migration policy, led by Volker Bouffier, Joachim Herrmann and Ralf Stegner.

=== 20th German Bundestag ===
In the 2021 German federal election, he won a direct mandate in the constituency of Halle.

In the 2021 election of the German federal parliament, Karamba Diaby won for the first time directly his constituency of Halle. With 28.8 percent of the votes in the first round, Diaby beat Christoph Bernstiel, who received 20.7 percent of the votes also during the first round.

In the 20th German Bundestag, he is a full member of the Committee for Economic Cooperation and Development and of the Committee for Foreign Affairs. He also has a membership in the Subcommittee on Global Health and in the Franco-German Parliamentary Assembly. The parliamentary group on West Africa is chaired by him and in the Subcommittee on International Climate and Energy Policy he is a substitute member.

Diaby has been subject to racist abuse and death threats and announced in 2024 that he would not be seeking re-election in the 2025 federal election.

== Political views ==
In 2018, Diaby joined other black elected representatives and community leaders from across Europe in signing an open letter in The Guardian in support of Black Italian politician Cécile Kyenge. Kyenge had been sued for defamation for calling the Italian League party racist.

== Other activities ==
=== Government agencies ===
- German Institute for Development Evaluation (DEval), Member of the advisory board (since 2022)
- Federal Agency for Civic Education, Alternate Member of the Board of Trustees

=== Non-profit organizations ===
- Business Forum of the Social Democratic Party of Germany, Member of the Political Advisory Board (since 2022)
- German Africa Foundation, Member of the Board (since 2022)
- German Network against Neglected Tropical Diseases (DNTDs), Member of the Parliamentary Advisory Board (since 2018)
- Max Planck Institute of Microstructure Physics, Member of the Board of Trustees
- Max Planck Institute for Social Anthropology, Member of the Board of Trustees
- IG Bergbau, Chemie, Energie (IG BCE), Member
- German Foundation for Peace Research (DSF), Member of the Board (2018–2022)
