= Demographics of Christianity =

Demographics of Christianity refers to the characteristics of Christians worldwide. More specifically, it may refer to:

- List of Christian denominations by number of members
- Christianity by country
- Christian population growth
