= Hi (film) =

2026 Indian film by Vishnu Edavan

- Theatrical release poster
- Directed by: Vishnu Edavan
- Written by: Vishnu Edavan
- Produced by: Nayanthara; Vignesh Shivan; S. S. Lalit Kumar
- Starring: Kavin; Nayanthara
- Cinematography: Rajesh Shukla
- Edited by: Philomin Raj
- Music by: Jen Martin
- Production companies: Zee Studios; Rowdy Pictures; Seven Screen Studio
- Distributed by: see below
- Release date: 28 August 2026
- Running time: 144 minutes
- Country: India
- Language: Tamil

Hi (stylised as Hi :)) is a 2026 Indian Tamil-language romantic comedy drama film written and directed by Vishnu Edavan in his directorial debut. Jointly produced by Zee Studios, Rowdy Pictures and Seven Screen Studio, the film stars Kavin and Nayanthara in the lead roles, alongside Radikaa Sarathkumar, K. Bhagyaraj, Prabhu, and Sathyan in supporting roles. It has music composed by Jen Martin, cinematography handled by Rajesh Shukla and editing by Philomin Raj. Hi was released in theatres on 28 August 2026 and received positive reviews from critics. The film was a hit at the box office and was Kavin's best performing film after Star (2024).

== Plot ==
Mayil proposes to his cousin and best friend Mythili, who rejects him due to his timid and cowardly nature. As Mayil strictly wishes to have a love marriage, he runs away to Chennai when his parents pressure him to have an arranged marriage.

The story shifts to a village one year later. Devayani is the only child of Indhiran, who became a drunkard awaiting the return of his wife, Usha, who had left home when Devayani was an infant. When she is forced into an arranged marriage with an abusive man, Devayani runs away to Chennai and finds asylum with her childhood friend, Lakshmi (Lux), who is Mayil's housemate and colleague.

Mayil and Devayani gradually become close friends and Devayani secures a job as a caretaker for the elderly mother of an affluent man. Soon, Mayil realises he has fallen in love with Devayani and plans to propose to her. However, before he can do so, Devayani reveals that she will be following her employer to London. As Mayil decides against confessing his feelings to Devayani, both of their families discover their locations and arrive in Chennai to bring them back home.

Not wanting to lose Devayani and be forced into an arranged marriage, Mayil concocts a lie that Devayani is pregnant with his child. To convince Devayani to go along with his lie, he tells her that he has fallen in love with a Pakistani woman and is awaiting her return, hence he needs to buy time until she can do so; Devayani agrees to this as she needs to buy some time before her employer can bring her to London.

Mayil’s parents and Devayani’s father plot to get their children married as soon as possible, and Devayani moves into Mayil’s home. Over the course of the next few weeks, Mayil attempts to make Devayani fall in love with him in an attempt to dissuade her from migrating to London. Meanwhile, Devayani becomes closer to Mayil’s family and her father too quits drinking for the sake of his daughter and her “unborn child”.

Things take a turn when Mayil’s maternal uncle Yogendran (Sathyan) discovers the truth about the pregnancy after overhearing a conversation between the couple, but Mayil and his friend knock him unconscious and imprison him. Soon after that, Mayil realises that he cannot force Devayani to fall in love with him by lying to her constantly and decides to reveal the truth to his family. At the same time, Devayani, unable to tolerate the guilt of lying to Mayil’s loving family, confesses the truth to Mayil’s mother (Radikaa Sarathkumar). Mayil’s maternal uncle too escapes and reveals the truth to his family before Mayil could do so.

His family chides him and apologises to Devayani and her father, who then return to their hometown. Mayil does not reveal the true nature of his lie to his family but instead tells them the version he told Devayani, adding that his Pakistani lover had rejected him like many other girls before. He soon begins avoiding Devayani and wallows in sadness.

Meanwhile, Devayani and her father are reunited with Usha (Suhasini Maniratnam) who reveals that she had not eloped with another man but instead, she had left home due to being branded as a bad omen on her family and she did not want to bring any more bad luck to her husband and daughter; she now lives as an ascetic praying for the happiness of her family. She reveals that Mayil was the one who discovered her. Following this, Devayani contacts Mayil’s friend, who reveals Mayil’s lies and that Devayani is the woman that Mayil has loved since the beginning.

Devayani travels to Chennai to meet Mayil and confesses her love to him. She reveals that she has loved him from the beginning too but her childhood abandonment had made her not believe in love. Mayil and Devayani unite.

== Cast ==
- Kavin as Mayilsamy "Mayil"
- Nayanthara as Devayani (Voice Dubbed by Deepa Venkat)
- Radikaa Sarathkumar as Parimala
- K. Bhagyaraj as Vaathiyar
- Prabhu as Indhiran
- VTV Ganesh as Doctor Shanmugi
- FEFSI Vijayan as Parisutham
- Sathyan as Yogendran
- Renji Panicker as Daasan
- Nithin Sathya as Auto Driver
- Kaavya Arivumani as Mythili
- Bala Hasan as Duraisamy
- Bakkiyam Sankar
- Adithya Kathir as Ganapathi
- Kuraishi as Gopi
- Nakkalites Dhanam as Duraisamy's mother
- Amrutha Srinivasan as Lakshmi "Lux"
- 'Mirchi' Kemy as Dhanya
- TSR as a Pimp
- Savithri
- Amy Rajan
- Prashanth
- Ammu Ramachandran as a Prostitute
- Suhasini Maniratnam as Usha, Indhiran's Wife (Special appearance)
- Vishalini Daniel as Astrologer (Uncredited)

== Production ==
The film marks the directorial debut of Vishnu Edavan, a lyricist who previously worked as an assistant director with Lokesh Kanagaraj on Kaithi, Master and Vikram. Additional screenplay and dialogues were written by C. U. Muthuselvan.

The project is produced by Nayanthara and Vignesh Shivan under their banner Rowdy Pictures, S. S. Lalit Kumar of Seven Screen Studio and Zee Studios. Vinoth C. J. and K. S. Mayil Vaganan serve as co-producers, while V. K. Kubendran is credited as creative producer.

The technical crew includes cinematographer Rajesh Shukla, editor Philomin Raj and production designer S. Kannan, with action sequences choreographed by Dinesh Kasi. Speaking about the project, Edavan described the film as a wholesome family entertainer without a conventional antagonist, comparing its tone to earlier Tamil family films such as Darling, Darling, Darling, Santosh Subramaniam and Yaaradi Nee Mohini. Filming had reached its final stages by April 2026.

== Music ==
Hi

Soundtrack album by Jen Martin
- Released: 25 August 2026
- Recorded: 2025–2026
- Genre: Feature film soundtrack
- Language: Tamil
- Label: Sony Music
- Producer: Jen Music

Jen Martin chronology
Kiss (2025)	Hi (2026)	Raawadi (2026)

Singles from Hi
- 1. "Kannakuzhiya" Released: 21 April 2026; 2. "Rasagulla" Released: 22 July 2026; 3. "Pacha Pulla" Released: 30 July 2026; 4. "Kudikara Nenju" Released: 24 August 2026

The soundtrack and score are composed by Jen Martin, with lyrics written by Vishnu Edavan and Ashique AR. The first single, "Kannakuzhiya", sung by G. V. Prakash Kumar, was released on 21 April 2026 and crossed around three million digital views. The second single, "Rasagulla", sung by Anirudh Ravichander and choreographed by Brinda, was released on July 2026. The third single "Pacha Pulla" was released on 30 July 2026. The last single titled "Kudikara Nenju" was released on 24 August 2026. The entire soundtrack album was released on 25 August 2026.

Track listing
No.	Title	Lyrics	Singer(s)	Length
1.	"Kannakuzhiya"	Vishnu Edavan	G. V. Prakash Kumar	3:06
2.	"Rasagulla"	Vishnu Edavan	Anirudh Ravichander	3:46
3.	"Pacha Pulla"	Ashique AR	Sathya Narayanan	3:40
4.	"Kudikara Nenju"	Vishnu Edavan	Dhruv Vikram
5.	"Alexa"	Vishnu Edavan	Ananya Chakraborty	2:29
6.	"Kathakali Kattappa"	Vishnu Edavan	Jen Martin; Sathya Narayanan	2:42
7.	"Sakkaraiye"	Vishnu Edavan	Deepthi Suresh	2:44
8.	"Theme of Hi"	–	Jen Martin	1:36
Total length:				24:06

== Release ==
=== Theatrical ===
Hi was initially scheduled for an April 2026 release, which was later revised. In July 2026 the makers announced that the film would receive a worldwide theatrical release on 14 August 2026, during the Independence Day weekend. Journalists noted that this set up a box office clash with Vishwanath & Sons. The film's release was subsequently postponed to 28 August 2026. It premiered in North America on 27 August 2026.

=== Distribution ===
Hi was distributed by Red Giant Movies in Tamil Nadu. The film's presenter Zee Studios handled the acquisition for the overseas distribution rights. The distribution rights in Malaysia were acquired by MSK Cinemas, and in Singapore by 2K Studios Pte. Ltd.

=== Home media ===
The post-theatrical satellite and streaming rights have been acquired by Zee Tamil and ZEE5 respectively. It began streaming on ZEE5 from 25 September 2026.

== Reception ==
Abhinav Subramanian of The Times of India wrote, "The wheel stays unreinvented. It spins nicely all the same". Bhuvanesh Chandar of The Hindu wrote, "With its warm and colourful frames, soulful songs, low-stakes drama, and writing that understands the enduring appeal of simple stories, Vishnu Edavan's film brings back a comforting strain of Tamil cinema, with a superb cast doing much of the heavy lifting". Manivasagan Namasivayam of DT Next wrote, "At a time when guns and glamour are being used to elevate heroism, debutant director Vishnu Edavan's Hi takes a refreshingly different route. It is a light-hearted, feel-good drama that makes for an engaging watch, particularly for family audiences".

Avinash Ramachandran of Cinema Express wrote, "This is an idea as old as love itself, and Vishnu doesn't try to reinvent the wheel. Instead, he allows the film, just like love, to find its own way, and where Hi ends up is in a place where desire doesn't have to be sacrificed on the altar of fear, and I think… that's beautiful". Latha Srinivasan of NDTV wrote, "Hi doesn't offer any novelty in any sense, and that's perhaps its biggest weakness. It is a pleasant rom-com, but the premise is dated and the conflicts are familiar tropes".
