= Momodu =

- Language: Yoruba

Origin
- Region of origin: West Africa

Momodu is given name and surname common in West Africa. Notable people with the surname include:

Given name

- Momodu Bama, second in command of the militant Islamist group Boko Haram
- Momodu Kargbo, Sierra Leonean politician and economist
- Momodu Koroma, Sierra Leonean politician
- Momodu Maligie, Sierra Leonean politician and former Minister of Water Resources for Sierra Leone.
- Momodu Munu, former diplomat from Sierra Leone.
- Momodu Mutairu, former Nigerian football player.

Surname

- Dele Momodu, Nigerian journalist
