= Aleš Erjavec =

Slovenian aesthetician (1951–2026)

- Born: 30 September 1951; Ljubljana, Socialist Federal Republic of Yugoslavia
- Died: 3 January 2026 (aged 74); Ljubljana, Slovenia

Philosophical work
- Main interests: Aesthetics, philosophy, avant-garde art, visual culture

Aleš Erjavec (30 September 1951 – 3 January 2026) was a Slovenian philosopher and aesthetician. He was professor of aesthetics at the University of Ljubljana, and separately at the University of Primorska, in Koper, Slovenia. He wrote extensively on aesthetics and on the post-modern avant-garde movement.

== Early years ==
He was born in 1951 in Ljubljana, into an academic family: his father, Franc Erjavec, was a medical pharmacologist and professor emeritus, and his mother, Marija Erjavec (née Bren), was a neonatologist. Aleš Erjavec attended schools in Ljubljana and Bethesda, Maryland before graduating from Poljane Grammar School in 1969.

He then went to University of Ljubljana, initially to study geology, before switching to philosophy and sociology. He got his bachelor's degree (BA) in 1975, his master's degree (MA) in 1979, then his PhD in 1987. His thesis had the title of "Ideology and the Art of Modernism".

== Academic career ==
Erjavec joined the Institute for Marxist Studies of the Slovenian Academy of Sciences and Arts (SAZU) in 1978 while he was a postgraduate student, and he stayed there until retirement in 2017. The institute was renamed in 1988 to its current title of the Institute of Philosophy. He held a range of research roles in a 39 year career at the institute, and ended up as the director of research.

In 2000 Erjavec became professor of aesthetics at University of Ljubljana, then two years later to the same title at the University of Primorska, in the faculty of humanities in Koper. There he was head of the Department of Cultural Studies, where he directed the postgraduate programme of 'Philosophy and Theory of Visual Culture' between 2004 and 2013.

From 2012 he became professor of aesthetics at two universities in China, firstly at Shanghai Jiao Tong University, and then Zhejiang University in Hangzhou. He was active on the international lecture and conference circuits, as well as maintaining links with other academic establishments with aesthetic faculties. He took a Fulbright Postdoctoral Fellowship at the University of California, Berkeley in the 1993-1994 academic year.

He helped to establish the Slovenian Society of Aesthetics (SDE), he was its first president from 1983 until 1999, and again for 2005-2011. He was a member of the Italian Association for Aesthetics (Italian: Associazione Italiana per gli Studi di Estetica) since 1998. He served as president of the International Association for Aesthetics (IAA/AIE) (1998–2001) and organised its 1998 international congress in Ljubljana. He was later made a life member of the association.

== Death ==
Aleš Erjavec died on 3 January 2026 in his home city of Ljubljana after a long illness. He was 72 years old.

== Works ==
He was internationally recognised for his scholarship in aesthetics, including in art theory, avant garde studies in the post-socialist era, modernism, postmodernism, and ideology. His work combined philosophical analysis with an understanding of artistic practices and their ideological contexts.

His major works include On Aesthetics, Art and Ideology (1983), Postmodernism and the Postsocialist Condition (2003), Love at Last Sight (2004), Aesthetic Revolutions (2015), The Heteronomy of Art and the Avant Gardes (2017), and The Impossible Histories (2003).
