= Halle (electoral district) =

Federal electoral district of Germany

71 Halle
- Electoral district for the Bundestag
- Halle in 2025
- State: Saxony-Anhalt
- Population: 272,100 (2019)
- Electorate: 209,765 (2021)
- Major settlements: Halle (Saale); Landsberg
- Area: 608.4 km^{2}

Current electoral district
- Created: 1990
- Party: AfD
- Member: Vacant
- Elected: 2025

Halle is an electoral constituency (German: Wahlkreis) represented in the Bundestag. It elects one member via first-past-the-post voting. Under the current constituency numbering system, it is designated as constituency 71. It is located in southern Saxony-Anhalt, comprising the city of Halle (Saale) and parts of the Saalekreis and Anhalt-Bitterfeld districts.

Halle was created for the inaugural 1990 federal election after German reunification. From 2021 to 2025, it was represented by Karamba Diaby of the Social Democratic Party (SPD). Since 2025 it has been represented by Alexander Raue of the AfD.

== Geography ==
Halle is located in southern Saxony-Anhalt. As of the 2025 federal election, it comprises the independent city of Halle (Saale), the municipalities of Kabelsketal, Landsberg, and Petersberg from the Saalekreis district, as well as the municipalities of Sandersdorf-Brehna and Zörbig from the Anhalt-Bitterfeld district.

== History ==
Halle was created after German reunification in 1990, then known as Halle-Altstadt. It acquired its current name in the 2002 election. In the 1990 through 1998 elections, it was constituency 291 in the numbering system. In the 2002 through 2009 elections, it was number 73. In the 2013 through 2021 elections, it was number 72. From the 2025 election, it has been number 71.

Originally, it comprised the independent city of Halle (Saale) without Halle-Neustadt. In the 2002 and 2005 elections, it was coterminous with the city of Halle (Saale). It was expanded to include surrounding municipalities from Saalekreis in the 2009 election, and further expanded into Anhalt-Bitterfeld ahead of the 2025 election.

| Election | No. | Name | Borders |
|---|---|---|---|
| 1990 | 291 | Halle-Altstadt | Halle (Saale) city (excluding Halle-Neustadt) |
| 1994 | 291 | Halle-Altstadt | Halle (Saale) city (excluding Halle-Neustadt) |
| 1998 | 291 | Halle-Altstadt | Halle (Saale) city (excluding Halle-Neustadt) |
| 2002 | 73 | Halle | Halle (Saale) city |
| 2005 | 73 | Halle | Halle (Saale) city |
| 2009 | 73 | Halle | Halle (Saale) city; Saalekreis district (only Kabelsketal, Landsberg, and Petersberg municipalities) |
| 2013 | 72 | Halle | Halle (Saale) city; Saalekreis district (only Kabelsketal, Landsberg, and Petersberg municipalities) |
| 2017 | 72 | Halle | Halle (Saale) city; Saalekreis district (only Kabelsketal, Landsberg, and Petersberg municipalities) |
| 2021 | 72 | Halle | Halle (Saale) city; Saalekreis district (only Kabelsketal, Landsberg, and Petersberg municipalities) |
| 2025 | 71 | Halle | Halle (Saale) city; Anhalt-Bitterfeld district (only Sandersdorf-Brehna and Zörbig municipalities); Saalekreis district (only Kabelsketal, Landsberg, and Petersberg municipalities) |

== Members ==
The constituency was first represented by Uwe-Bernd Lühr of the Free Democratic Party (FDP) from 1990 to 1994. As of 2021, this remains only occasion since the 1957 federal election in which the FDP has won a federal constituency. Christel Riemann-Hanewinckel of the Social Democratic Party (SPD) was elected representative in 1994, and served until 2009. In the 2009 election, Petra Sitte of The Left was elected. Christoph Bergner of the Christian Democratic Union (CDU) won the constituency in 2013 and served a single term. Christoph Bernstiel was elected in the 2017 election. Karamba Diaby regained it for the SPD in 2021.

| Election | Member | Party | % |
|---|---|---|---|
| 1990 | Uwe-Bernd Lühr | FDP | 34.5 |
| 1994 | Christel Riemann-Hanewinckel | SPD | 33.1 |
| 1998 | Christel Riemann-Hanewinckel | SPD | 40.7 |
| 2002 | Christel Riemann-Hanewinckel | SPD | 39.4 |
| 2005 | Christel Riemann-Hanewinckel | SPD | 36.0 |
| 2009 | Petra Sitte | LINKE | 33.7 |
| 2013 | Christoph Bergner | CDU | 36.3 |
| 2017 | Christoph Bernstiel | CDU | 27.1 |
| 2021 | Karamba Diaby | SPD | 28.8 |
| 2025 | Vacant (Note: Alexander Raue (AfD) won with 30.6% but seat remained vacant due to insufficient second votes cover.) | | |

== Election results ==
=== 2025 election ===
Federal election (2025): Halle
| Notes: | Blue background denotes the winner of the electorate vote. Pink background denotes a candidate elected from their party list. Yellow background denotes an electorate win by a list member, or other incumbent. A ✓ or ✗ denotes status of any incumbent, win or lose respectively. | | | | | | |
| Party | Candidate | Votes | % | ±% | Party votes | % | ±% |
|---|---|---|---|---|---|---|---|
| AfD | Alexander Raue | 52,541 | 30.6 | ▲14.5 | 49,342 | 28.6 | ▲13.1 |
| CDU | Christoph Bernstiel | 38,174 | 22.3 | ▲1.2 | 31,132 | 18.1 | ▼0.3 |
| Left | Janina Böttger | 27,802 | 16.2 | ▲3.4 | 26,437 | 15.3 | ▲4.0 |
| SPD | Eric Eigendorf | 30,796 | 18.0 | ▼10.1 | 20,794 | 12.1 | ▼11.4 |
| BSW | | | | | 17,545 | 10.2 | New |
| Greens | Jan Salis | 9,364 | 5.5 | ▼2.6 | 15,179 | 8.8 | ▼3.9 |
| FDP | Yana Mark | 5,045 | 2.9 | ▼5.1 | 6,059 | 3.5 | ▼6.7 |
| PARTEI | Christopher Pekel | 2,806 | 1.6 | ▲0.2 | 1,753 | 1.0 | 0.0 |
| Volt | | | | | 1,660 | 1.0 | ▲0.7 |
| FW | Falko Kadzimirsz | 2,866 | 1.7 | ▼0.8 | 1,616 | 0.9 | ▼0.8 |
| BD | Martin Schröder | 1,589 | 0.9 | New | 557 | 0.3 | New |
| MLPD | Adrian Mauson | 496 | 0.3 | 0.0 | 192 | 0.1 | 0.0 |
| Informal votes | | 2,108 | | | 1,321 | | |
| Total valid votes | | 171,479 | | | 172,266 | | |
| Turnout | | 173,587 | 77.3 | ▲6.4 | | | |
| AfD gain from SPD | Majority | 14,367 | 8.3 | N/A | | | |

=== 2021 election ===
Federal election (2021): Halle
| Notes: | Blue background denotes the winner of the electorate vote. Pink background denotes a candidate elected from their party list. Yellow background denotes an electorate win by a list member, or other incumbent. A ✓ or ✗ denotes status of any incumbent, win or lose respectively. | | | | | | |
| Party | Candidate | Votes | % | ±% | Party votes | % | ±% |
|---|---|---|---|---|---|---|---|
| SPD | Karamba Diaby | 42,335 | 28.8 | ▲7.5 | 34,686 | 23.6 | ▲9.5 |
| CDU | ✗ Christoph Bernstiel | 30,499 | 20.7 | ▼6.3 | 26,282 | 17.9 | ▼8.7 |
| AfD | Alexander Raue | 22,517 | 15.3 | ▼2.0 | 21,914 | 14.9 | ▼2.9 |
| Left | Petra Sitte | 19,247 | 13.1 | ▼7.2 | 17,180 | 11.7 | ▼7.6 |
| Greens | Inés Brock | 12,521 | 8.5 | ▲4.9 | 19,915 | 13.5 | ▲6.6 |
| FDP | Yana Mark | 11,867 | 8.1 | ▲1.3 | 15,150 | 10.3 | ▲1.3 |
| FW | Andrea Menke | 3,129 | 2.1 | ▲0.4 | 2,349 | 1.6 | ▲0.6 |
| Tierschutzpartei | | | | | 1,830 | 1.2 | |
| PARTEI | Jakob Brand | 2,335 | 1.6 | ▲0.1 | 1,611 | 1.1 | ▼0.8 |
| dieBasis | Stephan Kohn | 2,222 | 1.5 | | 1,988 | 1.4 | |
| Tierschutzallianz | | | | | 1,455 | 1.0 | ▼0.6 |
| Gartenpartei | | | | | 697 | 0.5 | ▲0.2 |
| Pirates | | | | | 678 | 0.5 | |
| Volt | | | | | 371 | 0.3 | |
| Humanists | | | | | 283 | 0.2 | |
| NPD | | | | | 254 | 0.2 | ▼0.3 |
| MLPD | Adrian Manuel Mauson | 399 | 0.3 | ▼0.1 | 199 | 0.1 | ▼0.1 |
| ÖDP | | | | | 197 | 0.1 | |
| du. | | | | | 185 | 0.1 | |
| Informal votes | | 1,505 | | | 1,352 | | |
| Total valid votes | | 147,071 | | | 147,224 | | |
| Turnout | | 148,576 | 70.8 | ▼0.2 | | | |
| SPD gain from CDU | Majority | 11,836 | 8.1 | | | | |

=== 2017 election ===
Federal election (2017): Halle
| Notes: | Blue background denotes the winner of the electorate vote. Pink background denotes a candidate elected from their party list. Yellow background denotes an electorate win by a list member, or other incumbent. A ✓ or ✗ denotes status of any incumbent, win or lose respectively. | | | | | | |
| Party | Candidate | Votes | % | ±% | Party votes | % | ±% |
|---|---|---|---|---|---|---|---|
| CDU | Christoph Bernstiel | 40,690 | 27.1 | ▼9.2 | 39,833 | 26.5 | ▼11.2 |
| SPD | Karamba Diaby | 32,053 | 21.3 | ▼2.0 | 21,196 | 14.1 | ▼3.8 |
| Left | Petra Sitte | 30,530 | 20.3 | ▼5.2 | 28,892 | 19.2 | ▼5.2 |
| AfD | Evelyn Nitsche | 26,018 | 17.3 | ▲13.9 | 26,727 | 17.8 | ▲13.6 |
| FDP | Frank Sitta | 10,131 | 6.7 | ▲4.6 | 13,533 | 9.0 | ▲5.9 |
| Greens | Grit Michelmann | 5,475 | 3.6 | ▼0.1 | 10,457 | 7.0 | ▼0.3 |
| FW | Holger Wenzel | 2,607 | 1.7 | ▲0.8 | 1,449 | 1.0 | ▲0.2 |
| PARTEI | Malte Hirschbach | 2,186 | 1.5 | | 2,896 | 1.9 | |
| Tierschutzallianz | | | | | 2,330 | 1.6 | |
| BGE | | | | | 780 | 0.5 | |
| NPD | | | | | 764 | 0.5 | ▼1.0 |
| DiB | | | | | 683 | 0.5 | |
| MLPD | Tassilo Timm | 585 | 0.4 | ▲0.1 | 372 | 0.2 | 0.0 |
| MG | | | | | 382 | 0.3 | |
| Informal votes | | 2,192 | | | 2,173 | | |
| Total valid votes | | 150,275 | | | 150,294 | | |
| Turnout | | 152,467 | 71.0 | ▲5.8 | | | |
| CDU hold | Majority | 8,637 | 5.8 | ▼5.0 | | | |

=== 2013 election ===
Federal election (2013): Halle
| Notes: | Blue background denotes the winner of the electorate vote. Pink background denotes a candidate elected from their party list. Yellow background denotes an electorate win by a list member, or other incumbent. A ✓ or ✗ denotes status of any incumbent, win or lose respectively. | | | | | | |
| Party | Candidate | Votes | % | ±% | Party votes | % | ±% |
|---|---|---|---|---|---|---|---|
| CDU | Christoph Bergner | 51,206 | 36.3 | ▲5.4 | 53,265 | 37.7 | ▲10.8 |
| Left | ✗ Petra Sitte | 36,006 | 25.5 | ▼8.2 | 34,449 | 24.4 | ▼7.3 |
| SPD | Karamba Diaby | 32,957 | 23.3 | ▲7.1 | 25,259 | 17.9 | ▲2.1 |
| Greens | Sebastian Kranich | 5,286 | 3.7 | ▼4.3 | 10,185 | 7.2 | ▼1.5 |
| AfD | Dirk Domicke | 4,768 | 3.4 | | 5,879 | 4.2 | |
| FDP | Cornelia Pieper | 2,958 | 2.1 | ▼6.5 | 4,418 | 3.1 | ▼8.5 |
| Pirates | Stephan Schurig | 2,898 | 2.1 | | 3,599 | 2.5 | ▼0.6 |
| NPD | Rolf Dietrich | 1,987 | 1.4 | ▼0.4 | 2,134 | 1.5 | ▼0.1 |
| Independent | Martin Bauersfeld | 1,325 | 0.9 | | | | |
| FW | Dietmar Weichler | 1,307 | 0.9 | | 1,147 | 0.8 | |
| MLPD | Frank Oettler | 449 | 0.3 | ▼0.4 | 317 | 0.2 | ▼0.1 |
| PRO | | | | | 341 | 0.2 | |
| ÖDP | | | | | 297 | 0.2 | |
| Informal votes | | 2,185 | | | 2,042 | | |
| Total valid votes | | 141,147 | | | 141,290 | | |
| Turnout | | 143,332 | 65.2 | ▲2.6 | | | |
| CDU gain from Left | Majority | 15,200 | 10.8 | | | | |

=== 2009 election ===
Federal election (2009): Halle
| Notes: | Blue background denotes the winner of the electorate vote. Pink background denotes a candidate elected from their party list. Yellow background denotes an electorate win by a list member, or other incumbent. A ✓ or ✗ denotes status of any incumbent, win or lose respectively. | | | | | | |
| Party | Candidate | Votes | % | ±% | Party votes | % | ±% |
|---|---|---|---|---|---|---|---|
| Left | Petra Sitte | 46,272 | 33.7 | ▲7.2 | 43,617 | 31.7 | ▲5.3 |
| CDU | Christoph Bergner | 42,430 | 30.9 | ▲5.2 | 37,004 | 26.9 | ▲5.7 |
| SPD | Johannes Krause | 22,341 | 16.3 | ▼19.2 | 21,684 | 15.8 | ▼17.2 |
| FDP | Cornelia Pieper | 11,760 | 8.6 | ▲3.2 | 15,974 | 11.6 | ▲2.2 |
| Greens | Claudia Dalbert | 11,056 | 8.1 | ▲4.7 | 11,950 | 8.7 | ▲1.9 |
| Pirates | | | | | 4,306 | 3.1 | |
| NPD | Andrea Machleid | 2,483 | 1.8 | ▼0.1 | 2,234 | 1.6 | ▼0.2 |
| MLPD | Frank Oettler | 981 | 0.7 | 0.0 | 511 | 0.4 | ▼0.2 |
| DVU | | | | | 320 | 0.2 | |
| Informal votes | | 2,462 | | | 2,185 | | |
| Total valid votes | | 137,323 | | | 137,600 | | |
| Turnout | | 139,785 | 62.6 | ▼9.1 | | | |
| Left gain from SPD | Majority | 3,842 | 2.8 | | | | |

=== 2005 election ===
Federal election (2005):Halle
| Notes: | Blue background denotes the winner of the electorate vote. Pink background denotes a candidate elected from their party list. Yellow background denotes an electorate win by a list member, or other incumbent. A ✓ or ✗ denotes status of any incumbent, win or lose respectively. | | | | | | |
| Party | Candidate | Votes | % | ±% | Party votes | % | ±% |
|---|---|---|---|---|---|---|---|
| SPD | ✓ Christel Riemann-Hanewinckel | 49,308 | 36.0 | ▼3.4 | 46,132 | 33.6 | ▼8.4 |
| Left | Petra Sitte | 37,607 | 27.4 | ▲4.9 | 26,746 | 26.8 | ▲9.6 |
| CDU | Christoph Bergner | 33,968 | 24.8 | ▼1.1 | 27,974 | 20.4 | ▼4.1 |
| FDP | Cornelia Pieper | 6,784 | 4.9 | ▼2.9 | 12,328 | 9.0 | ▲1.0 |
| Greens | Dietmar Weihrich | 4,822 | 3.5 | ▲0.4 | 9,902 | 7.2 | ▲1.3 |
| NPD | Andrea Machleid | 2,376 | 1.7 | | 2,295 | 1.7 | ▲0.9 |
| Independence | Helmut Gobsch | 1,232 | 0.9 | | | | |
| MLPD | Frank Oettler | 1,049 | 0.8 | | 848 | 0.6 | |
| Pro German Center – Pro D-Mark Initiative | | | | | 628 | 0.5 | |
| REP | | | | | 304 | 0.2 | |
| Schill | | | | | 144 | 0.1 | |
| Informal votes | | 2,660 | | | 2,505 | | |
| Total valid votes | | 137,146 | | | 137,301 | | |
| Turnout | | 139,806 | 71.2 | ▲1.1 | | | |
| SPD hold | Majority | 11,701 | 8.6 | | | | |
