= Kalp =

Kalp may refer to:

- KALP, a radio station in Alpine, Texas
- Malcolm Kalp, hostage in the Iran hostage crisis
- "Üç Kalp", a pop song from Turkish girl group Hepsi
- Kalpa (time), ancient Indian unit of time

== See also ==
- Kalpa (disambiguation)
- Kalb (disambiguation)
