= Christian population growth =

Population growth of the global Christian community

Christian population growth is the population growth of the global Christian community. According to a 2011 Pew Research Center survey, there were more than 2.2 billion Christians around the world in 2010, more than three times as many as the 600 million recorded in 1910. However, this rate of growth is slower than the overall population growth over the same time period. In 2020, Pew estimated the number of Christians worldwide to be around 2.38 billion. According to various scholars and sources, high birth rates and conversions in the Global South were cited as the reasons for the Christian population growth.

== Summary ==
Demographics of major traditions within Christianity (Pew Research Center, 2010 data)
Tradition	Followers	% of the Christian population	% of the world population	Follower dynamics	Dynamics in- and outside Christianity
Catholicism	1,094,610,000	50.1	15.9	▲ Growing	Stable
Protestantism	800,640,000	36.7	11.6	▲ Growing	▲ Growing
Orthodoxy	260,380,000	11.9	3.8	▼ Shrinking	▼ Shrinking
Other denominations	28,430,000	1.3	0.4	▲ Growing	▲ Growing
Christianity	2,184,060,000	100	31.7	Stable	Stable

World Christianity by tradition in 2024 as per World Christian Database
1. Catholic (48.6%)
2. Protestant (39.8%)
3. Orthodox (11.1%)
4. Other (0.50%)

Regional median ages of Christians compared with overall median ages (Pew Research Center, 2010 data)
	Christian median age in region (years)	Regional median age (years)
World	30	
Sub-Saharan Africa	19	18
Latin America-Caribbean	27	27
Asia-Pacific	28	29
Middle East-North Africa	29	24
North America	39	37
Europe	42	40

The Christian fertility rate is 2.7 children per woman, which is higher than the global average fertility rate of 2.5. Globally, Christians were only slightly older (median age of 30) than the global average median age of 28 in 2010. According to Pew Research religious switching is projected to have a modest impact on changes in the Christian population. According to various scholars and sources, Pentecostalism is the fastest-growing religious movement in the world; this growth is primarily due to religious conversion to Pentecostal and Charismatic Christianity.

According to the World Christian Encyclopedia, approximately 2.7 million have converted to Christianity from another religion. World Christian Encyclopedia also cited that Christianity ranks at first place in net gains through religious conversion. According to "The Oxford Handbook of Religious Conversion", approximately 15.5 million have converted to Christianity from another religion, while approximately 11.7 million leave Christianity, most to become irreligious, resulting in a net gain of 3.8 million. Christianity earns about 65.1 million people due to factors such as birth rate and religious conversion, while losing 27.4 million people due to factors such as death rate and religious apostasy. Most of the net growth in the numbers of Christians are in Africa, Latin America and Asia.

== Fertility rate ==
The Christian fertility rate has varied throughout history. The Christian fertility rate also varies from country to country. In the 20-year period from 1989 to 2009, the average world fertility rate decreased from 3.50 to 2.58, a fall of 0.92 children per woman, or 26%. The weighted average fertility rate for Christian nations decreased in the same period from 3.26 to 2.58, a fall of 0.68 children per woman, or 21%. The weighted average fertility rate for Muslim nations decreased in the same period from 5.17 to 3.23, a fall of 1.94 children per woman, or 38%. While Muslims have an average of 3.1 children per woman—the highest rate of all religious groups—Christians are second, with 2.7 children per woman.

The gap in fertility between the Christian- and Muslim-dominated nations fell from 67% in 1990 to 17% in 2010. According to a study published by the Pew Research Center in 2017, births to Muslims between the years of 2010 and 2015 made up an estimated 31% of all babies born around the world. By the Pew Research Center's estimates, the Muslim fertility rate and Christian fertility rate will converge by 2040.

Country	Fertility rate (2019) (births/woman)	Percent Christian
Ecuador	2.40	94%
East Timor	3.94	99%
Armenia	1.76	98.6%
Equatorial Guinea	4.43	92%
Moldova	1.27	95.3%
Venezuela	2.25	88.0%
Greece	1.35	90%

== Conversion ==
- According to the World Christian Encyclopedia, approximately 2.7 million convert to Christianity annually from another religion; World Christian Encyclopedia also stated that Christianity ranks in first place in net gains through religious conversion. While, according to book "The Oxford Handbook of Religious Conversion", which published by the professor of Christian mission Charles E. Farhadian, and the professor of psychology Lewis Ray Rambo, between 1990 and 2000, approximately 1.9 million people converted to Christianity from another religion, with Christianity ranking first in net gains through religious conversion.
- According to "The Oxford Handbook of Religious Conversion", in mid-2005 approximately 15.5 million converted to Christianity from another religion, approximately 11.7 million left Christianity, and most of them became irreligious, resulting in a net gain of 3.8 million. Christianity added about 65.1 million people due to factors such as birth rate and religious conversion, while it lost 27.4 million people due to factors such as death rate and religious apostasy in mid-2005. Most of the net growth in the numbers of Christians is in Africa, Latin America and Asia.
- According to scholar Philip Jenkins Christianity was growing rapidly in China and some other Asian countries and sub-Saharan Africa around 2002.
- According to various scholars and sources, Pentecostalism is the fastest-growing religious movement in the world; this growth is primarily due to religious conversion to Pentecostal and Charismatic Christianity. According to Pulitzer Center 35,000 people become Pentecostal or "Born again" every day. According to scholar Keith Smith of Georgia State University "many scholars claim that Pentecostalism is the fastest growing religious phenomenon in human history", and according to scholar Peter L. Berger of Boston University "the spread of Pentecostal Christianity may be the fastest growing movement in the history of religion".
- According to a 2012 report by the Singapore Management University, more people in Southeast Asia were converting to Christianity, and these new converts are mostly Chinese business managers. Scholars Juliette Koning and Heidi Dahles of Vrije Universiteit Amsterdam stated that there was a "rapid expansion of charismatic Christianity from the 1980s onwards. Singapore, China, Hong Kong, Taiwan, Indonesia, and Malaysia were said to have the fastest-growing Christian communities, and the majority of the new believers are "upwardly mobile, urban, middle-class Chinese". Asia has the second largest number of Pentecostal-charismatic Christians in any continent, with the number growing from 10 million to 135 million between 1970 and 2000. Scholar Wang Zuoa noted in 2014 that 500,000 Chinese people converted to Protestantism annually. According to scholar Todd Hartch of Eastern Kentucky University, by 2005, around 6 million Africans converted to Christianity annually.
- Conversion into Christianity has significantly increased among Korean, Chinese, and Japanese in the United States. In 2012, the percentage of Christians in these communities were 71%, 30% and 37% respectively.
- Due to conversion, the number of Chinese Christians increased significantly from 4 million before 1949 to 67 million in 2010.
- It's been reported also that increasing numbers of young people or educated people are becoming Christians in several countries such as China, Hong Kong, Indonesia, Iran, Japan, Singapore, and South Korea.
- The 2015 Believers in Christ from a Muslim Background: A Global Census study published by Baylor University institute for studies of religion estimates that 10.2 million Muslims converted to Christianity based on global missionary data. Countries with the largest numbers of Muslims converted to Christianity according to this study include Indonesia (6,500,000), Nigeria (600,000), Iran (500,000 versus only 500 in 1979), the United States (450,000), Ethiopia (400,000) and Algeria (380,000). Indonesia is home to the largest Christian community made up of converts from their former Islamic faith; according to various sources, since the mid and late 1960s, between two million and 2.5 million Muslims converted to Christianity.
- According to the Council on Foreign Relations, in 2007 experts estimated that thousands of Muslims in the Western world were converting to Christianity annually, but did not publicize their conversions due to fear of retribution.

== By branches ==
=== Catholic Church ===
- Church membership in 2019 was 1.34 billion people (18% of the global population at the time), increasing from the 1950 figure of 437 million and 654 million in 1970. On 31 December 2008, membership was 1.166 billion, an increase of 11.54% over the same date in 2000, and slightly greater than the rate of increase of the world population (10.77%). The increase was 33.02% in Africa, but only 1.17% in Europe. It was 15.91% in Asia, 11.39% in Oceania, and 10.93% in Americas. As a result, Catholics were 17.77% of the total population in Africa, 63.10% in Americas, 3.05% in Asia, 39.97% in Europe, 26.21% in Oceania, and 17.40% of the world population. Of the world's Catholics, the proportion living in Africa grew from 12.44% in 2000 to 14.84% in 2008, while those living in Europe fell from 26.81% to 24.31%. However, Catholic numbers have grown in Scandinavia where the Catholics in Nordic dioceses have tripled or even quadrupled. For example, in Denmark, Norway, Sweden and Finland, 330,000 Catholics have now registered in their dioceses. Membership of the Catholic Church is attained through baptism, and from 1983 to 2009, if someone formally left the Church, that fact was noted in the register of the person's baptism.
- Monsignor Vittorio Formenti, who compiles the Vatican's yearbook, said in a 2008 interview with the Vatican newspaper L'Osservatore Romano that "For the first time in history, we are no longer at the top: Muslims have overtaken us." He said that Catholics accounted for 17.4 percent of the world population - a stable percentage - while Muslims were at 19.2 percent. "It is true that while Muslim families, as is well known, continue to make a lot of children, Christian ones on the contrary tend to have fewer and fewer", the monsignor said, though Africa and parts of Asia are the exception. If the UN report in 2018 is on target, Africa's population will grow to 4.5 billion by 2100, adding to all African religious groups. Muslims in 2010 represented as much as 23.4% of the total world population and this is expected to increase to 26.3% by 2030. In 2016, the global Catholic population was projected to grow to 1.63 billion in 2050.

=== Protestantism ===
- According to Mark Jürgensmeyer of the University of California, popular Protestantism is one of the most dynamic religious movements in the contemporary world. Changes in worldwide Protestantism over the last century have been significant. Since 1900, due primarily to conversion, Protestantism has spread rapidly in Africa, Asia, Oceania and Latin America.
- There are more than 1.17 billion Protestants worldwide, among approximately 2.4 billion Christians. In 2010, a total of more than 800 million included 300 million in Sub-Saharan Africa, 260 million in the Americas, 140 million in Asia-Pacific region, 100 million in Europe and 2 million in Middle East-North Africa. Protestants account for nearly forty percent of Christians worldwide and more than one tenth of the total human population.
- Protestantism is growing in Africa, Eastern Europe, Asia, Latin America, Muslim world, and Oceania, while remaining stable or declining in Anglo America and Europe, with some exceptions such as France, where it was nearly eradicated after the abolition of the Edict of Nantes by the Edict of Fontainebleau and the following persecution of Huguenots, but now is claimed to be stable in number or even growing slightly and Spain, where the Protestantism is growing faster than other religious groups. According to some, Russia is another country to see a Protestant revival.
- According to various scholars and sources, Pentecostalism is the fastest-growing religious movement in the world; this growth is primarily due to religious conversion to Pentecostal and Charismatic Christianity. According to Pulitzer Center 35,000 people become Pentecostal or "Born again" every day. According to scholar Keith Smith of Georgia State University "many scholars claim that Pentecostalism is the fastest growing religious phenomenon in human history", and according to scholar Peter L. Berger of Boston University "the spread of Pentecostal Christianity may be the fastest growing movement in the history of religion".

== By continent ==
- According to the Carnegie Endowment for International Peace, the World Christian Database as of 2007 estimated the six fastest-growing religions of the world to be Islam (1.84%), the Baháʼí Faith (1.7%), Sikhism (1.62%), Jainism (1.57%), Hinduism (1.52%) and Christianity (1.32%). High birth rates and conversions in the global South were cited as the reasons for the Christian population growths.
- The U.S. Center for World Mission stated a growth rate of Christianity at 2.3% for the period 1970 to 1996 (slightly higher than the world population growth rate at the time). This increased the claimed percentage of adherents of Christianity from 33.7% to 33.9%.
- The World Christian Database as of 2007 estimated the growth rate of Christianity at 1.32%. High birth rates and conversions were cited as the main reasons.
- Using data from the period 2000–2005 the 2006 Christian World Database estimated that by number of new adherents, Christianity was the fastest growing religion in the world with 30,360,000 new adherents in 2006. This was followed by Islam with 23,920,000 and Hinduism with 13,224,000 estimated new adherents in the same period.
- According to 2011 Pew Research Center survey, there are more than 2.2 billion Christians around the world in 2010, up from about 600 million in 1910.
- The 2015 "Believers in Christ from a Muslim Background: A Global Census" estimates 10,283,700 Muslim converted to Christianity around the world.
- On 2 April 2015, the Pew Research Center published a Demographic Study about "The Future of World Religions: Population Growth Projections, 2010-2050" with projections regarding Christianity. The projection begins with 2010 statistics when "Christianity was by far the world's largest religion, with an estimated 2.2 billion adherents, nearly a third (31%) of all 6.9 billion people on Earth. Islam was second, with 1.6 billion adherents, or 23% of the global population."

Projected growth of Christianity by 2050

Some of the projections are as follows:

1. Over the 2010-2050 period, Christians will remain the largest religious group with 30.7% of the world's population. However, Islam will grow faster and become 29.7% of the world's population. Therefore, by 2050 there will be 2.8 billion Muslims compared to 2.9 billion Christians.
2. "In the United States, Christians will decline from more than three-quarters of the population in 2010 to two-thirds in 2050".
3. "Four out of every 10 Christians in the world will live in sub-Saharan Africa".

Reasons given for the projected growth

Some of the reasons the Study gives are as follows:

1. The change in the world's religious is "driven primarily by differences in fertility rates and the size of youth populations among the world's major religions, as well as by people switching faiths".
2. Fertility rates. "Religions with many adherents in developing countries, where birth rates are high, and infant mortality rates generally have been falling, are likely to grow quickly." Therefore, much of the growth of Christianity is projected to take place in sub-Saharan Africa. Globally, Christians have a birth rate of 2.7 children per woman. But Muslims have a higher rate, namely, an average of 3.1 children per woman. This differential is one of the reasons that the Muslim population is growing faster than the Christian.
3. Size of youth population. "In 2010, more than a quarter of the world's total population (27%) was under the age of 15." Christian youth under 15 were the same as the 27% global average. But an even higher percentage of Muslims (34%) were younger than 15. This higher youth population is one of the reasons that from 2010 to 2050 Muslims are projected to grow faster than Christians.
4. Size of old population. In 2010, "11% of the world's population was at least 60 years old", 14% of the Christian population was over 60 years old, but only 7% of Muslims were over 60. This is another reason that Muslims are projected to grow faster than Christians.
5. Switching. A loss of 66 million Christians is projected to come through switching. Most of the loss is projected to come from Christians "joining the ranks of the religiously unaffiliated".

The whole Pew Research Center can be read by clicking The Future of World Religions.

=== Africa ===
- Christianity has been estimated to be growing rapidly in Latin America, Africa, and Asia. In Africa, for instance, in 1900, there were only 8.7 million adherents of Christianity; now there are 390 million, and it is expected that by 2025 there will be 600 million Christians in Africa. The number of Catholics in Africa has increased from one million in 1902 to 329,882,000. From 2015 to 2016 alone, Africa saw an increase of 49,767,000 Catholics, a larger increase than any other continent.
- According to scholar Todd Hartch of Eastern Kentucky University, by 2005, around 6 million Africans converted to Christianity annually.
- According to scholar R.V. Dmitriev, over 3.3 million African converted to Christianity in 2010.

==== Algeria ====
- Since 1960 a growing number of Algerian Muslims are converting to Christianity.
- Converts to Christianity may be investigated and searched by the authorities. Conversions to Christianity have been most common in Kabylie, especially in the wilaya of Tizi-Ouzou.

==== Morocco ====
- Since 1960 a growing number of Moroccan Muslims are converting to Christianity.
- On 27 March 2010, the Moroccan magazine TelQuel stated that thousands of Moroccans had converted to Christianity. Pointing out the absence of official data, Service de presse Common Ground cites unspecified sources that stated that about 5,000 Moroccans became Christians between 2005 and 2010. According to the International Religious Freedom Report for 2014 estimate that there may be as many as 8,000 Christian citizens throughout the country, but many reportedly do not meet regularly due to fear of government surveillance and social persecution.
- According to different estimates, there are about 25,000-45,000 Moroccan Christians of Berber or Arab descent mostly converted from Islam. Other sources give a number of a bit more than 1,000. A popular Christian program by Brother Rachid has led many former Muslims in North Africa and the Middle East to convert to Christianity. His programs have been credited with assisting in the conversion of over 150,000 former Muslims to Christianity in Morocco.

==== Nigeria ====
- The percentage of Christians in Nigeria grew from 21.4% in 1953 to 48.2% in 2011.

==== South Africa ====
- In South Africa, Pentecostalism has grown from 0.2% in 1951 to 7.6% in 2001.

==== Tunisia ====
- International Religious Freedom Report for 2007 estimate thousands of Tunisian Muslims who convert to Christianity.

=== Americas ===
==== Argentina ====
- A 2015 study estimates some 2,200 Christian believers from a Muslim background in the country, most of them belonging to some form of Protestantism.
- Data from 2013, show that 64,000 Argentine Jews identify themselves as Christians.

==== Canada ====
- According to 1991/2001/2011-Census, the number of Christians in Canada has decreased from 22.5 million to 22.1 million.
- A 2015 study estimates some 43,000 believers in Christ from a Muslim background in Canada, most of whom belong to the evangelical tradition.

==== United States ====
The United States government does not collect religious data in its census. The survey below, the American Religious Identification Survey (ARIS) 2008, was a random digit-dialed telephone survey of 54,461 American residential households in the contiguous United States. The 1990 sample size was 113,723; 2001 sample size was 50,281.

Adult respondents were asked the open-ended question, "What is your religion, if any?" Interviewers did not prompt or offer a suggested list of potential answers. The religion of the spouse or partner was also asked. If the initial answer was "Protestant" or "Christian" further questions were asked to probe which particular denomination. About one-third of the sample was asked more detailed demographic questions.

Among the Asian population in the United States, conversion into Christianity is significantly increasing among Korean, Chinese, and Japanese. By 2012 the percentage of Christians in these communities was 71%, 31%, and 38% respectively.

Data from the Pew Research Center states that, as of 2013, about 1.6 million adult American Jews identify themselves as Christians, most as Protestants. According to the same data, most of the Jews who identify themselves as some sort of Christian (1.6 million) were raised as Jewish or are Jews by ancestry. According to a 2014 study by the Pew Research Center, 19% of those who say they were raised Jewish in the United States, consider themselves Christian.

According to Pew Research, Christianity loses more people than it gains from religious conversion. It found that 23% of Americans raised as Christians no longer identified with Christianity, whereas 6% of current Christians converted. This was in contrast to Islam in America, where the number of people who left the religion in the 2010s was roughly equal to the number who converted to it. The National Catholic Register claims that in 2015 there were 450,000 American Muslim converts to Christianity and that 20,000 Muslims convert to Christianity annually in the United States. According to scholar Rob Scott of University of Tasmania in 2010 there were "approximately 180,000 Arab Americans and about 130,000 Iranian Americans who converted from Islam to Christianity".

Religious Self-Identification of the U.S. Adult Population: 1990, 2001, 2008
Figures are not adjusted for refusals to reply; investigators suspect refusals are possibly more representative of "no religion" than any other group.

Source:ARIS 2008
Group	1990 adults x 1,000	2001 adults x 1,000	2008 adults x 1,000	Numerical Change 1990– 2008 as % of 1990	1990 % of adults	2001 % of adults	2008 % of adults	change in % of total adults 1990– 2008
Adult population, total	175,440	207,983	228,182	30.1%				
Adult population, Responded	171,409	196,683	216,367	26.2%	97.7%	94.6%	94.8%	−2.9%
Total Christian	151,225	159,514	173,402	14.7%	86.2%	76.7%	76.0%	−10.2%
Catholic	46,004	50,873	57,199	24.3%	26.2%	24.5%	25.1%	−1.2%
non-Catholic Christian	105,221	108,641	116,203	10.4%	60.0%	52.2%	50.9%	−9.0%
Baptist	33,964	33,820	36,148	6.4%	19.4%	16.3%	15.8%	−3.5%
Mainline Christian	32,784	35,788	29,375	−10.4%	18.7%	17.2%	12.9%	−5.8%
Methodist	14,174	14,039	11,366	−19.8%	8.1%	6.8%	5.0%	−3.1%
Lutheran	9,110	9,580	8,674	−4.8%	5.2%	4.6%	3.8%	−1.4%
Presbyterian	4,985	5,596	4,723	−5.3%	2.8%	2.7%	2.1%	−0.8%
Episcopalian/Anglican	3,043	3,451	2,405	−21.0%	1.7%	1.7%	1.1%	−0.7%
United Church of Christ	438	1,378	736	68.0%	0.2%	0.7%	0.3%	0.1%
Christian Generic	25,980	22,546	32,441	24.9%	14.8%	10.8%	14.2%	−0.6%
Christian Unspecified	8,073	14,190	16,384	102.9%	4.6%	6.8%	7.2%	2.6%
Non-denominational Christian	194	2,489	8,032	4040.2%	0.1%	1.2%	3.5%	3.4%
Protestant – Unspecified	17,214	4,647	5,187	−69.9%	9.8%	2.2%	2.3%	−7.5%
Evangelical/Born Again	546	1,088	2,154	294.5%	0.3%	0.5%	0.9%	0.6%
Pentecostal/Charismatic	5,647	7,831	7,948	40.7%	3.2%	3.8%	3.5%	0.3%
Pentecostal – Unspecified	3,116	4,407	5,416	73.8%	1.8%	2.1%	2.4%	0.6%
Assemblies of God	617	1,105	810	31.3%	0.4%	0.5%	0.4%	0.0%
Church of God	590	943	663	12.4%	0.3%	0.5%	0.3%	0.0%
Other Protestant Denominations	4,630	5,949	7,131	54.0%	2.6%	2.9%	3.1%	0.5%
Churches of Christ	1,769	2,593	1,921	8.6%	1.0%	1.2%	0.8%	−0.2%
Seventh-Day Adventist	668	724	938	40.4%	0.4%	0.3%	0.4%	0.0%
Jehovah's Witnesses	1,381	1,331	1,914	38.6%	0.8%	0.6%	0.8%	0.1%
Church of Jesus Christ of Latter Day Saints	2,487	2,697	3,158	27.0%	1.4%	1.3%	1.4%	0.0%
Total non-Christian religions	5,853	7,740	8,796	50.3%	3.3%	3.7%	3.9%	0.5%
Jewish	3,137	2,837	2,680	−14.6%	1.8%	1.4%	1.2%	−0.6%
Eastern Religions	687	2,020	1,961	185.4%	0.4%	1.0%	0.9%	0.5%
Buddhist	404	1,082	1,189	194.3%	0.2%	0.5%	0.5%	0.3%
Muslim	527	1,104	1,349	156.0%	0.3%	0.5%	0.6%	0.3%
New Religious Movements & Others	1,296	1,770	2,804	116.4%	0.7%	0.9%	1.2%	0.5%
None/ No religion, total	14,331	29,481	34,169	138.4%	8.2%	14.2%	15.0%	6.8%
Agnostic+Atheist	1,186	1,893	3,606	204.0%	0.7%	0.9%	1.6%	0.9%
Did Not Know/ Refused to reply	4,031	11,300	11,815	193.1%	2.3%	5.4%	5.2%	2.9%

Highlights:

1. The ARIS 2008 survey was carried out from February–November 2008 and collected answers from 54,461 respondents who were questioned in English or Spanish.
2. The American population self-identifies as predominantly Christian but Americans are slowly becoming less Christian.
  - 86% of American adults identified as Christians in 1990 and 76% in 2008.
  - The historic Mainline churches and denominations have experienced the steepest declines while the non-denominational Christian identity has been trending upward particularly since 2001.
  - The challenge to Christianity in the United States does not come from other religions but rather from a rejection of all forms of organized religion.
3. 34% of American adults considered themselves "Born Again or Evangelical Christians" in 2008.
4. The U.S. population continues to show signs of becoming less religious, with one out of every seven Americans failing to indicate a religious identity in 2008.
  - The "Nones" (no stated religious preference, atheist, or agnostic) continue to grow, though at a much slower pace than in the 1990s, from 8.2% in 1990 to 14.1% in 2001, to 15.0% in 2008.
  - Asian Americans are substantially more likely to indicate no religious identity than other racial or ethnic groups.
5. One sign of the lack of attachment of Americans to religion is that 27% do not expect a religious funeral at their death.
6. Based on their stated beliefs rather than their religious identification in 2008, 70% of Americans believe in a personal God, roughly 12% of Americans are atheist (no God) or agnostic (unknowable or unsure), and another 12% are deistic (a higher power but no personal God).
7. America's religious geography has been transformed since 1990. Religious switching along with Hispanic immigration has significantly changed the religious profile of some states and regions. Between 1990 and 2008, the Catholic population proportion of the New England states fell from 50% to 36% and in New York it fell from 44% to 37%, while it rose in California from 29% to 37% and in Texas from 23% to 32%.
8. Overall the 1990–2008 ARIS time series shows that changes in religious self-identification in the first decade of the 21st century have been moderate in comparison to the 1990s, which was a period of significant shifts in the religious composition of the United States

=== Asia ===
- According to scholar Philip Jenkins Christianity is growing rapidly in China and some other Asian countries.
- According to a report by the Singapore Management University, more people in Southeast Asia are converting to Christianity, and these new converts are mostly Chinese business managers.
- According to scholar Juliette Koning and Heidi Dahles of Vrije Universiteit Amsterdam there is a "rapid expansion of charismatic Christianity from the 1980s onwards. Singapore, China, Hong Kong, Taiwan, Indonesia, and Malaysia are said to have the fastest-growing Christian communities and the majority of the new believers are "upwardly mobile, urban, middle-class Chinese". Asia has the second largest Pentecostal-charismatic Christians of any continent, with the number growing from 10 million to 135 million between 1970 and 2000".

==== Afghanistan ====
- In 2009-2010, the United States Department of State estimated the numbers of Muslim Afghans who had converted to Christianity as being between 500 and 8,000.

==== Azerbaijan ====
- According to reports in the early 2000s, there were about 5,000 ethnic Azerbaijani Protestant community, most of them from Muslim backgrounds.

==== Bangladesh ====
- According to scholars Khalil Bilici, during the Bangladesh Liberation War (March–December 1971), a significant number of Bangladeshis left Islam to join Christianity (because missionaries stood with them during their difficult times during the civil strife) or to atheism after 1971 due to their experience of oppression conducted by fellow Muslims from West Pakistan.
- The United Nations High Commissioner for Refugees estimated the numbers of the Muslim who convert to Christianity in Bangladesh has risen from two hundred thousand to four hundred thousand between 1971 and 1991.
- The Home Office estimated that up to 91,000 Muslims have converted to Christianity in Bangladesh from 2012 to 2018.

==== China ====
- The number of Chinese Christians has increased significantly, particularly since the easing of restrictions on religious activity during the reform and opening up in the late 1970s; Christians were 4 million before 1949 (including Catholics and Protestants), and reaching 67 million (unofficial figure) in 2010. Various statistical analyses have found that between 2% and 4% of the Chinese identify as Christian.
- The government declared in 2018 that there are over 44 million Christians (Protestant: 38M, Catholic: 6M) in China.
- According to a study by a scholar Fenggang Yang from Purdue University, Christianity is "spreading among the Chinese of South-East Asia", and "Evangelical and Pentecostal Christianity is growing more quickly in China", also according to him, more than half of them have university degrees.
- According to the Council on Foreign Relations the "number of Chinese Protestants has grown by an average of 10 percent annually since 1979" as of 2018.

==== India ====
- While the exact number of Dalit converts to Christianity in India is not available, scholar William R. Burrow of Colorado State University estimated that about 8% of Dalit have converted to Christianity.
- According to a 2021 study by the Pew Research Center, Christianity in India gained an increase from conversion, most of the Christian converts in India are former Hindus.

==== Indonesia ====
- According to various sources, between 1965 and 1985 about 2.5 million Indonesian converted from Islam to Christianity.
- Some reports also show that many of the Chinese Indonesians minority convert to Christianity. Demographer Aris Ananta reported in 2008 that "anecdotal evidence suggests that more Buddhist Chinese have become Christians as they increased their standards of education".

==== Iran ====
- Significant numbers of Muslims convert to Christianity in Iran, estimates range from 300,000 to 500,000 by various sources. Other estimates put the numbers between 800,000 and 3 million.
- According to scholar Ladan Boroumand "Iran [as of 2020 was] witnessing the highest rate of Christianization in the world", and according to scholar Shay Khatiri of Johns Hopkins University "Islam is the fastest shrinking religion in there [Iran], while Christianity is growing the fastest", and in 2018 "up to half a million Iranians are Christian converts from Muslim families, and most of these Christians are evangelicals", and he adds "recent estimates claim that the number might have climbed up to somewhere between 1 million and 3 million".

==== Israel ====
- Several thousand Israelis practice Messianic Jewish denominations, which are often considered as Christian sects. The Messianic Jews usually combine Jewish and Christian practices but do recognize Jesus as the Messiah. There are no exact numbers on those communities, but it is believed that several hundred to several thousand ethnic Jews belong to this tradition as well as several thousand Israelis of mixed ancestry (mostly mixed Jewish and Slavic).

==== Japan ====
- Christianity is one of several minority religions in Japan, accounting for between less than 1 percent and 1.5% of the population.
- According to a poll conducted by the Gallup Organization in 2006, Christianity has increased significantly in Japan, particularly among youth, and a high number of teens are becoming Christians.

==== Kyrgyzstan ====
- Exact numbers of Muslim Kyrgyz converts to Christianity vary but an estimate of around 20,000 is generally accepted among scholars

==== Malaysia ====
- There is no well researched agreement on the actual number of Malaysian Muslim converts to Christianity in Malaysia. But according to Tan Sri Dr Harussani Zakaria, they are 260,000.

==== Singapore ====
- The percentage of Christians among Singaporeans increased from 12.7% in 1990 to 17.5% in 2010.
- According to scholar Michael Nai-Chiu Poon of University of Toronto conversion to Christianity was increasing among Chinese Singaporeans as of 2010.
- It was reported also that increasing numbers of young people or educated people in Singapore were becoming Christians in the 2010s.

==== South Korea ====
- In South Korea, Christianity has grown from 20.7% in 1985 to 29.5% in 2005 according to the World Christian Database.

==== Syria ====
- During the 2010s, converting to Christianity grew among Muslims in the Syrian diaspora, and among Kurds in Syria.
- By one estimate made by Elisabet Granli from University of Oslo, around 1,920 Syrian Druz converted to Christianity.

==== Tajikistan ====
- 3000 Converts to Christianity.

==== Turkey ====
- According to the newspaper "Milliyet", 35,000 Muslim Turks converted to Christianity in 2008.

The ethnic Turkish Protestant Christian community in Turkey number about 4,000-5,000 adherents most of them came from Muslim Turkish background.

==== Vietnam ====
- The US Department of State estimates that Protestant Christianity may have grown 600% over the last decade in Vietnam.

=== Europe ===
==== Albania ====
- Since 1960 a growing number of Albanian Muslims are converting to Christianity.
- Converting to Christianity is growing among Muslims in the Albanian diaspora.

==== Belgium ====
- Reports estimated that "many" Muslims convert every year to Christianity in Belgium.

==== Bulgaria ====
- Reports estimated that thousands of Muslims (mostly Bulgarian Turks) convert every year to Christianity in Bulgaria.

==== Denmark ====
- There are report of Muslim refugees converting in Denmark.

==== France ====
- Protestants have increased as a percentage of total population from 1% in 1987 to 3% in 2009.
- Reports form Le Monde estimated that 15,000 Muslims convert every year to Christianity.
- Some scholars and media reports indicate that there been increasing numbers of conversions to Christianity among the Maghrebis in France.

==== Georgia ====
- More than 20,000 Muslims have converted to Christianity in Georgia (Abkhazia).

==== Germany ====
- Reports estimated that thousands of Muslims convert every year to Christianity in Germany and vice versa.
- Some scholars and media reports indicate that there been increasing numbers of conversions to Christianity among Kurds and Turks in Germany. According to scholars Felix Wilfred from the University of Madras and Chris Hann from the University of Cambridge and Max Planck Institute for Social Anthropology, since the fall of communism, the number of Muslim converts to Christianity in Kyrgyzstan has been increased.

==== Kosovo ====
- Reports estimated that hundreds of Muslims convert every year to Christianity in Kosovo.

==== Norway ====
- It is estimated that Orthodoxy is the fastest-growing religious faith in Norway, due to immigration from other countries, with a growth rate from 2000 to 2009 at 231.1%.

==== Netherlands ====
- Reports estimated that 4,500 Muslims have converted to Christianity in the Netherlands.
- During the 2010s, a number of Dutch Muslims converted to Christianity.

==== Russia ====
- According to Roman Silantyev the executive secretary of the Inter-religious Council in Russia, about 2 million Muslims in Russia have converted to Christianity between during the last fifteen years while only 2,500 Russians converted to Islam.
- According to a 2012 study, 17% of Jews in Russia identify themselves as Christians.

==== Spain ====
- Between 1998 and 2018, Protestantism grew from 0.24% to 1.96% of the Spanish population.

==== Sweden ====
- During the 2010s, a number of Swedish Muslims have converted from Islam to the Church of Sweden, most noticeably by Iranians, but also by Arabs and Pakistanis.

==== United Kingdom ====
- During the 2010s, a number of Muslims have converted to Christianity in the United Kingdom.

=== Oceania ===
==== Australia ====
- A 2015 study estimates some 20,000 Muslim converted to Christianity in Australia, most of them belonging to some form of Protestantism.

== See also ==
- Muslim population growth
- Growth of religion
- Decline of Christianity in the Western world
- Christian views on contraception
- Christian mission
- Christianity by country
- Christian emigration
