= Bama Vijayam =

Bama Vijayam (lit. 'Victory of Bama') may refer to:

- An episode of the ancient Indian epic Mahabharata, involving Krishna's wife Satyabhama
- Bama Vijayam (1934 film), an Indian Tamil-language film
- Bama Vijayam (1967 film), an Indian Tamil-language film by K. Balachander

== See also ==
- Bama (disambiguation)
- Bhama (disambiguation)
- Vijaya (disambiguation)
- Bhama Vijayam, a 1967 Indian Telugu-language film
- Tu Tu Main Main, an Indian Hindi-language comedy TV series, dubbed in Telugu as Bhama Vijayam
