= Frank Sitta =

German politician (born 1978)

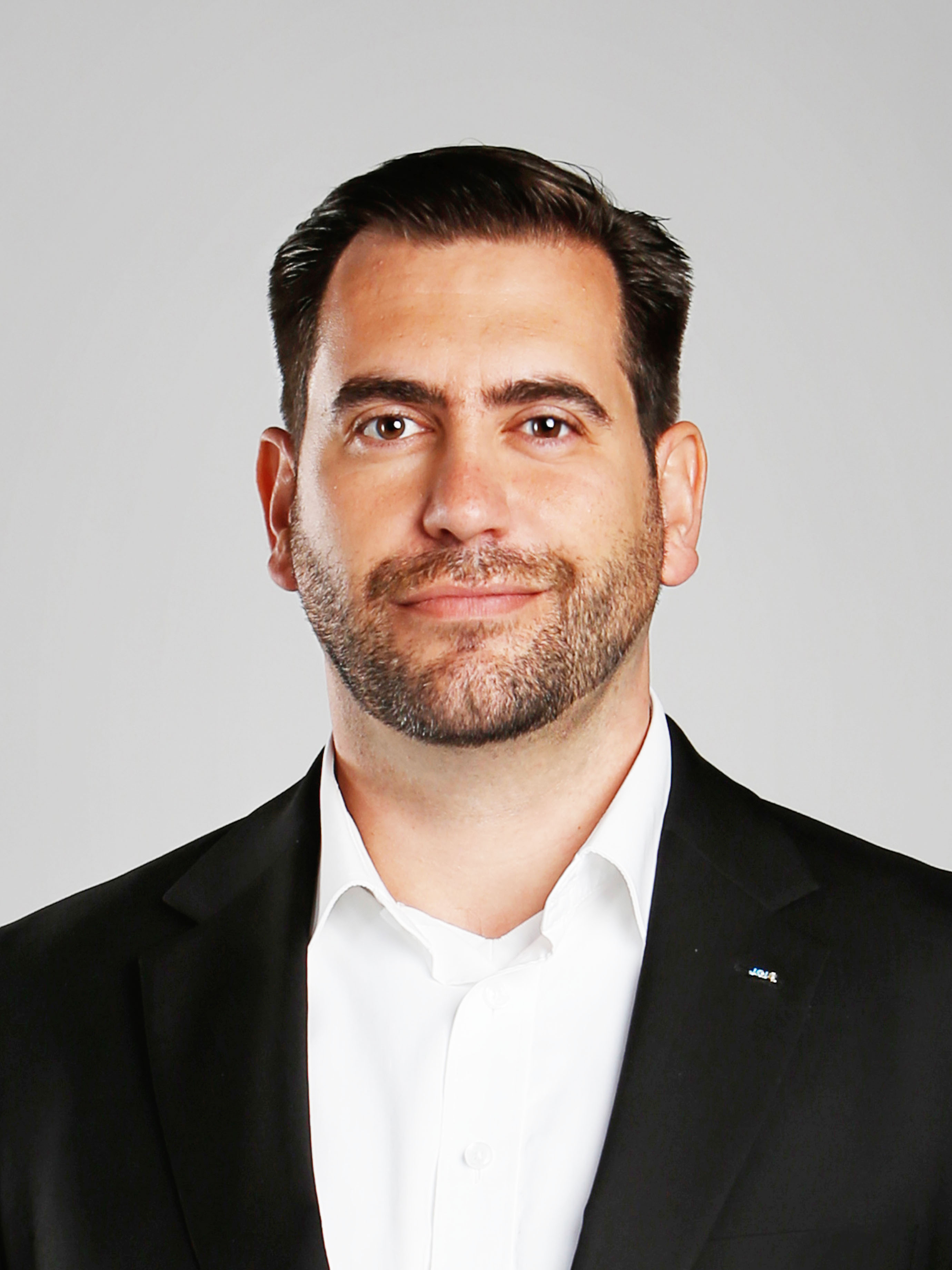
- Frank Sitta in 2015

Member of the Bundestag
- In office 2017–2021

Personal details
- Born: 30 June 1978 (age 47) Sangerhausen, East Germany (now Germany)
- Party: FDP
- Children: 2

Frank Sitta (born 30 June 1978) is a German politician of the Free Democratic Party (FDP) who served as a member of the Bundestag from the state of Saxony-Anhalt from 2017 until 2021.

== Early life and career ==
After graduating from the Thomas-Müntzer-Gymnasium in Halle and completing his civilian service, Sitta studied political science and economics at the Martin Luther University Halle-Wittenberg and obtained the academic degree of Diplom-Political Scientist.

In 2008 Sitta founded his current company, Sitta Kongress- und Eventmanagement GmbH. In addition, Sitta completed training as a European Event Manager at the European Media and Event Academy in Baden-Baden in 2009.

== Political career ==
In 2001 Sitta joined the FDP. He became a member of the Bundestag in the 2017 German federal election, representing Halle. He served as one of his parliamentary group’s chairpersons, under the leadership of Christian Lindner. In this capacity, he oversaw the group’s legislative initiatives on digitisation; transport and digital infrastructure; construction, housing, urban development and local authorities; environment, nature conservation and nuclear safety; agriculture and food. In addition, he was a member of the German Parliamentary Friendship Group with Cyprus and Malta.

In July 2020, Sitta announced that he would not stand in the 2021 federal elections but instead resign from active politics by the end of the parliamentary term.

== Life after politics ==
Since 2022, Sitta has been leading the Berlin office of General Atomics.
