= Marie-Claire Foblets =

Anthropologist, lawyer, professor

Marie-Claire, Baroness Foblets is a Belgian lawyer and anthropologist, who is currently Director of the Max Planck Institute for Social Anthropology and Professor at the Katholieke Universiteit Leuven. Her research interests are interculturalism, migration and minorities.

In 2004, she was awarded the Francqui Prize on Human Sciences for her research on anthropology. In 2016, the Katholieke Universiteit Leuven gave her an honorary degree. She is a member of the Saxon Academy of Sciences and an Honorary Professor of Law and Anthropology, Martin Luther University Halle-Wittenberg, Germany.

In 2007, she was featured on a Belgian stamp.

== Publications (selection) ==
- B. Saunder/ M. Foblets (Hrsg.): Changing genders in intercultural perspectives. Leuven University Press, Leuven 2002.
- Marie-Claire Foblets/Trutz von Throtha (Hrsg.): Healing the Wounds. Essays on the Reconstruction of Societies after War. Oxford: Hart Publishing 2004 (Oñati International Series in Law and Society).
- Marie-Claire Foblets/Alison Dundes Renteln (Hrsg.): Multicultural Jurisprudence. Comparative Perspectives on the Cultural Defense. Oxford: Hart Publishing 2009 (Oñati International Series in Law and Society).
- K. Alidadi/M. Foblets, M./J. Vrielink (Hrsg.): A Test of Faith? Religious Diversity and Accommodation in the European Workplace. Aldershot: Ashgate 2012.
