= Charles M. Huber =

German actor and politician

Charles Muhamed Huber
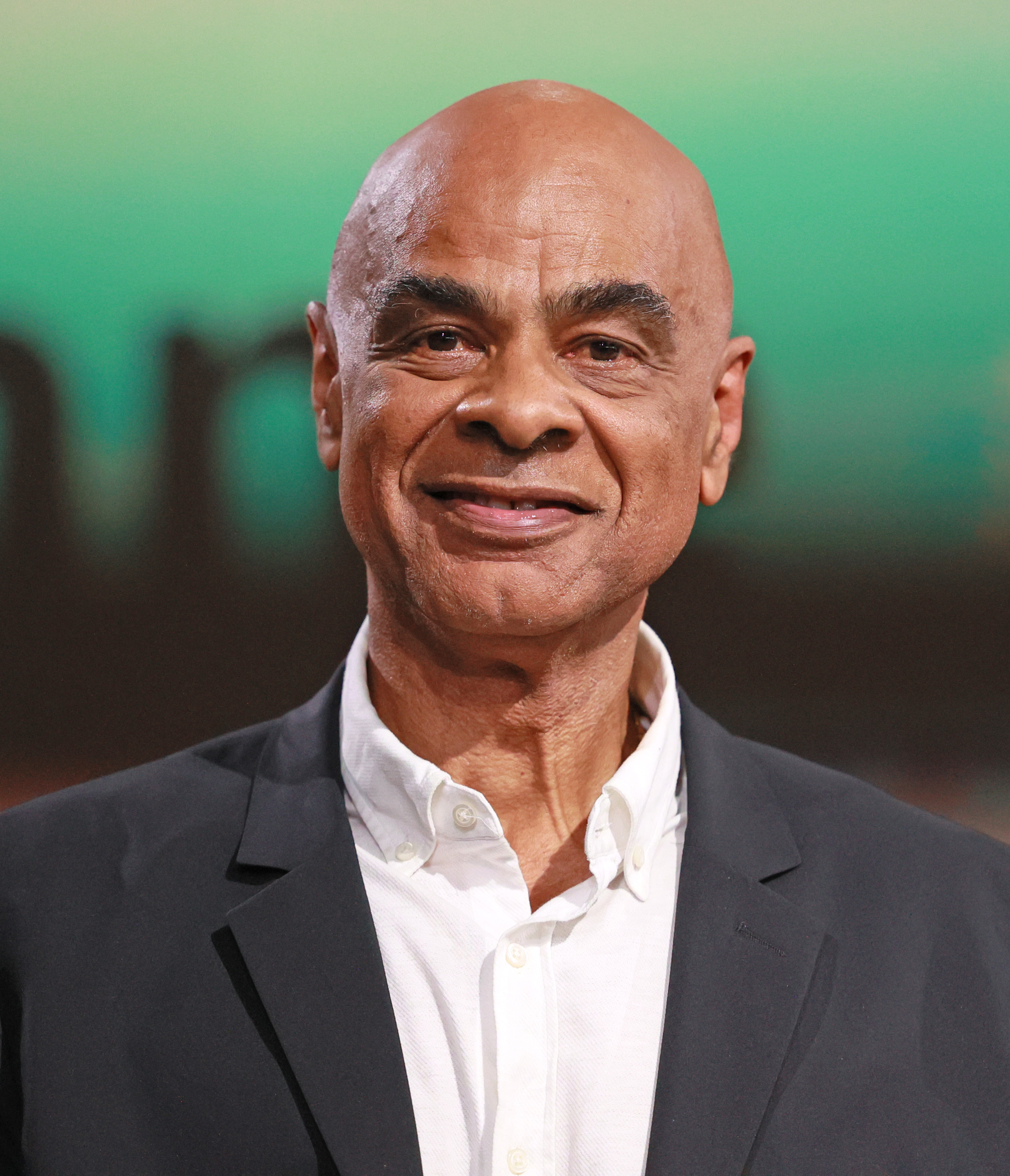
- Charles Muhamed Huber, 2023

Member of the Bundestag
- In office 2013–2017

Personal details
- Born: 3 December 1956 (age 69) Munich, Bavaria, West Germany
- Citizenship: German
- Party: CDU
- Children: 4

Video statement (2014)

Charles Muhamed Huber (born 3 December 1956 in Munich as Karl-Heinz Huber) is a German politician and actor. He was one of the first two Bundestag members of African ancestry, alongside Karamba Diaby, who were both elected on 23 September 2013. Huber is a member of the Christian Democratic Union, and was elected in the federal state of Hesse whereas he failed to win the Darmstadt constituency.

As an actor, Huber played Henry Johnson in the German crime series Der Alte.

== Early life and education ==
Huber was born in 1956, the son of a Senegalese father, who was a diplomat and nephew of the former president of Senegal and philosopher Léopold Sédar Senghor, and a German mother in Munich. Huber completed a dental technician's apprenticeship.

== Career ==
In the German TV series Der Alte, Huber reached fame when he played the part of police superintendent Henry Johnson from 1986 to 1997.

In 2002, Huber founded the organisation Afrika Direkt e. V., which supports young people, the poor, and artists in Senegal. He published an autobiography in 2005.

Since 2009, Huber has been a representative of the international council of the association Austrian Service Abroad, which is also attended by others, including Wladyslaw Bartoszewski, György Dalos, Alberto Dines, Gabriela von Habsburg, Beate Klarsfeld, Branko Lustig, Erika Rosenberg and Ben Segenreich.

=== Member of the German Bundestag, 2013–2017 ===
Huber was elected member of the German Bundestag in the 2013 federal elections. During his time in parliament, he served on the Committee for Economic Cooperation and Development, which provides parliamentary oversight of the Federal Ministry of Economic Cooperation and Development. On the committee, he was his parliamentary group's rapporteur on West and Central Africa, raw materials and illegal drug trade.

In addition, Huber was the chairman of the Parliamentary Friendship Group for Relations with the English- and Portuguese-speaking States of West and Central Africa (Gambia, Ghana, Guinea-Bissau, Cape Verde, Liberia, Nigeria, Sierra Leone); a member of the Parliamentary Friendship Group for Relations with the Francophone States of West and Central Africa; and a member of the Parliamentary Friendship Group for Relations with the States of Central America.

In February 2016, Huber accompanied German President Joachim Gauck on a state visit to Nigeria and Mali, where they met with the countries' respective presidents Muhammadu Buhari and Ibrahim Boubacar Keïta.

In June 2016, Huber announced that he would not stand in the 2017 federal elections but instead resign from active politics by the end of the parliamentary term.

== Other activities ==
- St Barbara Foundation, Member of the Board of Trustees

== Publications ==
Charles M. Huber Ein Niederbayer im Senegal. Mein Leben zwischen zwei Welten, Scherz, Frankfurt a. M. 2005, ISBN 3-596-16271-8
