= Kalpa =

Kalpa or Kalpas may refer to:

- KalPa, a Finnish men's ice hockey team
- KalPa Naiset, a Finnish women's ice hockey team
- Kalpa (time) a Sanskrit word referring to a great length of time (Aeon)
- Kalpa (Vedanga), meaning "proper practice" or "ritual", one of the six disciplines of Vedanga in Hinduism
- Kalpa, Himachal Pradesh, India
- Kalpas (river), a river of Asia Minor

== See also ==
- Kalp (disambiguation)
- Bhama Kalapam (disambiguation)
