= Bhama Kalapam =

Bhama Kalapam may refer to

- Bhamakalapam, a traditional dance form popular in Andhra Pradesh, India
- Bhama Kalapam, a 1988 Indian Telugu-language film by Relangi Narasimha Rao
- Bhamakalapam, a 2022 Indian Telugu-language film
  - Bhamakalapam 2, its 2024 sequel

== See also ==
- Bhama (disambiguation)
- Kalpa (disambiguation)
