= Sathyabhama (disambiguation) =

Sathyabhama or Satyabhama is a Hindu goddess and the third queen-consort of the Hindu god Krishna.

Sathyabhama and Satyabhama may also refer:

- Sathyabhama (actress), an Indian film actress
- Sathyabhama Das Biju, an Indian herpetologist and conservationist
- Satyabhama Devi, an Indian politician
- Vally Sathyabhama, an Indian athlete
- Sathyabhama (1963 film), an Indian Malayalam-language film
- Satyabhama (2007 film), an Indian Telugu-language film
- Satyabhama (2024 film), an Indian Telugu-language film

== See also ==
- Satya (disambiguation)
- Bhama (disambiguation)
