= Sathyan =

Sathyan is a common Indian name and can refer to:

- Sathyan (Malayalam actor) (1912–1971), Manuel Sathyaneshan, Malayalam film actor
- Sathyan (Tamil actor) (born 1975), Tamil film comedian and actor
- Sathyan (singer) (born 1980), Sathyan Mahalingam, an Indian playback singer and composer

== See also ==
- Sathya (disambiguation)
