= Christel Riemann-Hanewinckel =

German politician

Christel Riemann-Hanewinckel (born 6 April 1947 in Bad Tennstedt) is a German politician (SPD).

From 1998 to 2002, she served as Chairwoman of the Bundestag Committee for Family Affairs, Senior Citizens, Women and Youth. From 2002 to 2005, she held the position of Parliamentary State Secretary at the Federal Ministry for Family Affairs, Senior Citizens, Women and Youth.

== Life and career ==
After graduating from Arnoldischule in Gotha in 1965, Christel Riemann-Hanewinckel trained as a bookseller and worked in this profession until 1970. She then studied theology at Martin Luther University Halle-Wittenberg until 1976. She then worked as a pastor at the district pastorate for hospital pastoral care in Halle/Saale until 1990. From 1980 to 1990, she was a member of the executive committee of the Halle/Saale district synod and was deputy superintendent from 1988 to 1990. In 1990, she graduated as a supervisor of pastoral psychology.

Christel Riemann-Hanewinckel is married and has two children.

== Party ==
In October 1989, she was one of the co-founders of the SDP (later SPD) in the GDR. From 1993 to 2005 she was chairwoman of the Halle/Saale SPD city association. From 2002 to 2004, she held the position of deputy state chairwoman of the SPD Saxony-Anhalt.

Christel Riemann-Hanewinckel is co-editor of Spw - Zeitschrift für sozialistische Politik und Wirtschaft.

== Member of Parliament ==
From 1990 to 1992, she was a city councillor and vice president of the city council of Halle/Saale.

From 1990 to 2009, she was a member of the German Bundestag. She was a member of the executive committee of the SPD Bundestagsfraktion from 1998 to 2002 and also chaired the Committee for Family, Senior Citizens, Women and Youth.

In 1990, Christel Riemann-Hanewinckel was elected via the state list of Saxony-Anhalt. She then served as a directly elected member of the Bundestag constituency Halle-Altstadt in the Bundestag. In the 2005 Bundestag election, she received 36.0% of the first vote.

== Public offices ==
After the 2002 Bundestag election, she was appointed Parliamentary State Secretary to the Federal Minister for Family Affairs, Senior Citizens, Women and Youth on 22 October 2002 in the Federal Chancellor's Gerhard Schröder Federal Chancellor led by Gerhard Schröder.

After the 2005 Bundestag elections, the leadership of the Ministry of Family Affairs was transferred to Ursula von der Leyen (CDU) and Christel Riemann-Hanewinckel left office on 22 November 2005.

From 2009 to 2019, Christel Riemann-Hanewinckel was President of the Evangelische Arbeitsgemeinschaft Familie.

== Cabinets ==
- Cabinet Schröder II
