= KALB =

KALB or Kalb may refer to:

== People ==
- Bernard Kalb (1922–2023), journalist, media critic and author, brother of Marvin
- Buddy Kalb (born 1938), American singer-songwriter and musician
- Cassius D. Kalb, American songwriter and musician
- Danny Kalb (1942–2022), American blues guitarist
- Don Kalb, Dutch social anthropologist
- Johann de Kalb (1721–1780), German soldier
- Klaus Kalb (born 1942), German lichenologist
- Marvin Kalb (born 1930), American journalist, brother of Bernard

== Other ==
- the ICAO airport code for Albany International Airport in Albany, New York, United States
- KALB-TV, a television station digital channel 35 (virtual channel 5.1) in Alexandria, Louisiana, United States
- KJMJ (580 AM), a radio station in Alexandria, Louisiana, United States which held the call sign KALB from 1935 to 1995
- KZMZ (96.9 FM), a radio station in Alexandria, Louisiana, United States which held the call sign KALB-FM from 1947 to 1979
- the Banu Kalb, a tribe of Arabia during Muhammad's era
- Kalb (term), the Arabic word for "dog"
