= Christoph Bernstiel =

German politician (born 1984)

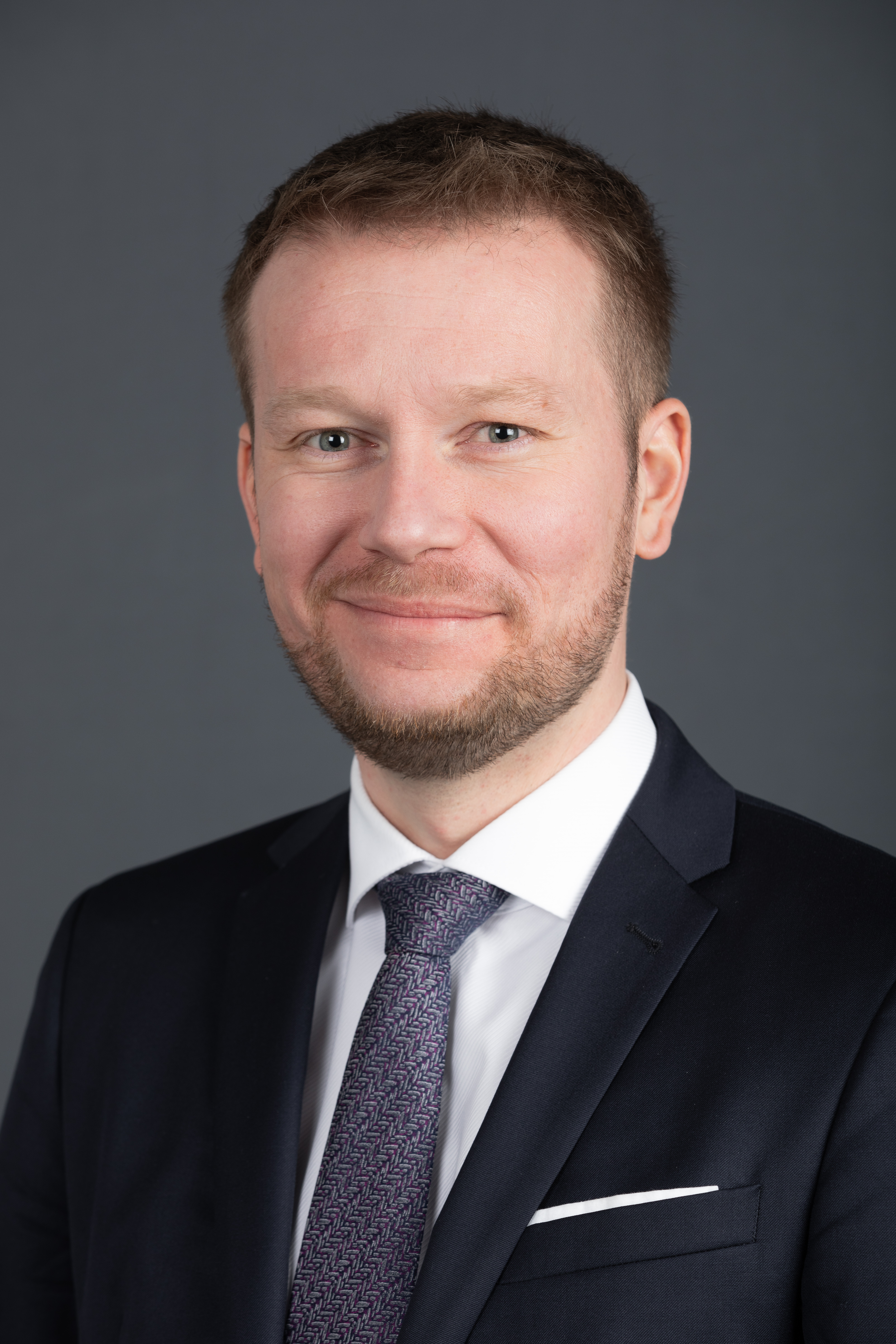

Member of the Bundestag for Halle
- In office 2017–2021

Personal details
- Born: 8 February 1984 (age 42) Bernburg, Bezirk Halle, East Germany (now Germany)
- Citizenship: German
- Party: CDU
- Occupation: Politician

Christoph Bernstiel (born 8 February 1984 in Bernburg, Bezirk Halle) is a German politician in the Christian Democratic Union (CDU) who served as a member of the German Bundestag from 2017 to 2021. In addition, he has served on the Halle (Saale) municipal council since 2014.

== Education and early career ==
Bernstiel studied political science and sociology at the Martin Luther University of Halle-Wittenberg until 2010 graduating with a Magister Artium. From 2010 to 2017, he worked at the multimedia centre Mitteldeutsches Multimediazentrum Halle (Saale), initially as PR officer and later as head of communications.

While working, Bernstiel took a compact study course at the German Press Academy (depak) from 2010 to 2012, graduating with a degree in communication management. In 2012, he founded the company KOBE PR. He has been a certified PR consultant since 2013, certified by the testing and certification organisation of the German communications industry PZOK.

== Political career ==
=== Early beginnings ===
Bernstiel joined the CDU and the Junge Union (JU), the youth section of the CDU, in 2005. In 2006, he became a member of the RCDS, the German Association of Christian Democratic Students. Bernstiel was elected chairman of the Bernburg county branch of the JU from 2006 to 2007 and, following administrative reform, chairman of the Salzland county branch of the JU from 2007 to 2011. From 2009 to 2011, he was commissioner for social policy in the federal executive of the JU. Bernstiel served as chairman of the North Halle (Saale) local branch of the CDU from 2013 to 2019. He has been on the Halle (Saale) municipal council since 2014 and, since 2017, Member of the Bundestag for Halle (Saale), Kabelsketal, Landsberg, and Petersberg after previously defeating several competitors within his own party. Since 2019 Bernstiel is head of the specialised committee on federal and European affairs of the Saxony-Anhalt CDU.

=== Member of the Bundestag ===
On 24 September 2017, Bernstiel was elected to the German Bundestag as a direct candidate with 27.1% of all first votes in the Halle constituency and northern Saale district going to the CDU. In parliament, he served on the Committee on Internal Affairs and Community and was a substitute member of the Study Commission "Artificial Intelligence – Social Responsibility and Economic, Social and Ecological Potential".

He was also a substitute member of the Committee on Cultural and Media Affairs and the Committee on Family Affairs, Senior Citizens, Women and Youth. He was further a member of the working groups of the CDU/CSU parliamentary group on the economic development of the Eastern part of Germany, municipal policy, and young Members as well as a member of the SME Circle in the German Bundestag.

In addition, Bernstiel was a member of the German-Nordic, German-Japanese and German-Baltic parliamentary friendship groups. He also served as deputy chair of the Bundestag group of CDU parliamentarians from Saxony-Anhalt, a member of the board of trustees of the Foundation for the Study of the SED Dictatorship and substitute member of the board of trustees of the Federal Agency for Civic Education.

In the field of internal affairs, Bernstiel's key areas are IT security and cybersecurity and political extremism. Since early 2019, this also includes the critical review of security issues in building up the 5G network in Germany. His work focuses on securing the technological sovereignty of Germany and preventing the country from becoming dependent on individual manufacturers.

He is working to keep the participation of Chinese companies in the expansion of the 5G mobile network as low as possible to prevent manipulation or intervention in the national security of Germany.

Bernstiel also takes an active role against any form of extremism and politically motivated crime. Alongside these key areas, Bernstiel also works on the topics of counterintelligence, international police missions, and the digital radio network for German security authorities and organizations. In the new allocation of frequencies, Bernstiel is working to ensure that security authorities and not the energy industry are allotted the 450 MHz band.

=== Career in local politics ===
Christoph Bernstiel was elected to the municipal council of Halle (Saale) in 2014. He was a member of the committee on planning affairs and the committee on human resources development until 2018. He is currently a member of the committee on order and environmental affairs and deputy chair of the committee on urban development. On 26 May 2019, Bernstiel was re-elected to the municipal council.
