= Christian Albrecht (politician, born 1982) =

German politician (born 1982)

Member of the Landtag of Saxony-Anhalt
- Incumbent
- Assumed office 6 June 2021
- Preceded by: Alexander Raue
- Constituency: Halle I

Personal details
- Born: 14 October 1982 (age 43) Merseburg
- Party: Christian Democratic Union (since 2016)

Christian Albrecht (born 14 October 1982 in Merseburg) is a German politician serving as a member of the Landtag of Saxony-Anhalt since 2021. He is the chairman of the Election Review Committee.
