= Satya (disambiguation) =

Satya (nominative satyam) is a central concept in Indian religions that loosely translates into English as "Truth". Satya, Sathya, Satyam or Sathyam may refer to:

== Film and television ==
- Satyam (1976 film), a Tamil language film, starring Sivaji Ganesan & Jayachitra
- Sathyam (1980 film), a 1980 Malayalam film starring Sreenath and Shanthi Krishna
- Sathyaa, a 1988 Tamil language film, starring Kamal Haasan
- Satya (1998 film), a 1998 Hindi film directed by Ram Gopal Varma, initiating his Gangster film series
  - Satya 2, a 2013 sequel to the 1998 film, fourth in the series overall
- Satyam (2003 film), a 2003 Telugu film directed by Surya Kiran, starring Sumanth and Genelia D'Souza
- Sathyam (2004 film), a 2004 Malayalam film starring Prithviraj and Priyamani
- Satyam (2008 film), a Tamil language film
- Sathya (2010 film), an Indian Kannada romance drama film
- Sathya (2017 Tamil film), an Indian Tamil crime thriller
- Sathya (2017 Malayalam film), an Indian Malayalam action thriller
- Sathya (Tamil TV series), a 2019 Tamil soap opera
  - Sathya 2, a 2021 sequel to the 2019 Tamil soap opera
- Sathya (Kannada TV series), a 2020 Kannada soap opera

== Religion ==
- Nagnajiti, a queen-consort of Hindu god Krishna
- Sacca, Theravada Pali term
- Satya Mahima Dharma, religious tradition in Hinduism in India
- Satya Pir, belief system created by the fusion of Islam and local religions in Bengal
- Satya Yuga, Era of Truth in Hinduism

== Other ==
- Satya (magazine), an American animal rights magazine
- Satya Wacana Christian University, private university located in Salatiga, Central Java, Indonesia
- Mahindra Satyam, a defunct Indian computer services company, formerly known as Satyam Computer Services
- Satya Vaswani, also known as Symmetra, a character in the 2016 video game Overwatch
- Honda Brio Satya, a model of the Honda Brio for the Indonesian market

== People ==
=== People with the surname ===
- Habel Satya (born 1987), Indonesian footballer
- Tatineni Satya, Indian film maker

=== People with the given name ===
- Satya Narayana Charka, Indian-American dancer, teacher, and choreographer
- Satya Pal Jain (born 1952), Indian politician from Punjab
- Satya Krishnan, Indian actress
- Satya Nadella (born 1967), Indian-American business executive, CEO of Microsoft
- Satya Nandan, Fiji diplomat and lawyer
- Satyam Patel (1932–2005), Indian social worker and activist
- Satya Bhabha (born 1983), British actor
- Satya Prabhakar (born 1963), Indian-American entrepreneur, engineer and writer
- Satya Prakash (physicist) (born 1929), Indian physicist
- Sathya (Tamil actor), Indian Tamil actor
- Satya (Telugu actor), Indian Telugu actor
- Satyam (composer) (1933–1989), Indian film music composer
- Satyam Rajesh, Indian Telugu actor and comedian
- Satyam Sankaramanchi (1937–1987), Indian Telugu writer
- Satya Sarkar, Indian cricketer
- Satya Vrat Shastri (born 1930), Indian Sanskrit scholar, writer, grammarian and poet

== See also ==
- Satyam (surname)
- Satyameva Jayate, "truth alone triumphs", Indian national motto
- Satyabhama (disambiguation)
- Satyam
