= Don Kalb =

Dutch anthropologist

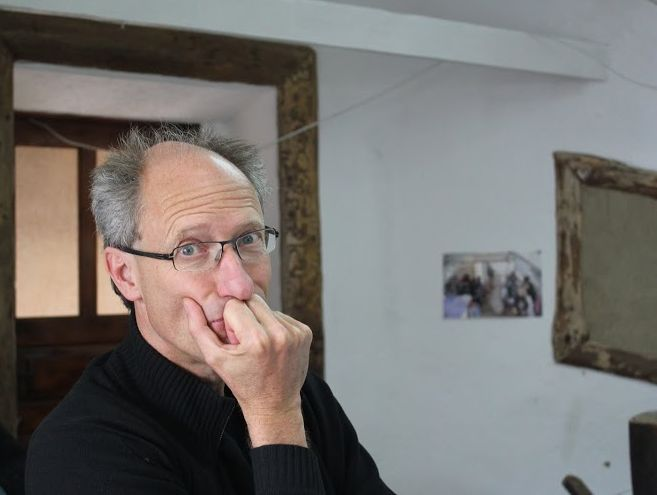
- Kalb in Butuceni Village, Orhei District, Republic of Moldova, May 2014
- Born: October 15, 1959 (age 66)
- Occupations: anthropologist, scholar

Academic background
- Education: Universiteit Utrecht (Ph.D. 1995); Catholic University of Nijmegen (M.A. 1988)
- Thesis: Expanding class: power and everyday politics in industrial communities, North Brabant illustrations, 1850-1950 (1995)

Academic work
- Discipline: Anthropologist
- Sub-discipline: Social anthropology, Political economy
- Institutions: Central European University, Universiteit Utrecht, University of Bergen

Don Kalb (born 15 October 1959) is a Dutch anthropologist, full professor of social anthropology at the University of Bergen, and an assistant professor of social sciences and cultural anthropology at Universiteit Utrecht. For many years, Kalb was a professor of sociology and social anthropology at the Central European University.

== Biography ==
=== Early life and education ===
Kalb grew up in the municipality of Eindhoven. Born into a family of cigar and textile producers, the significant development Eindhoven experienced in the 1960s, catalyzed by the growth of the Phillips Corporation headquartered in the city, influenced Kalb to take up anthropology as a method of investigating what he describes as "the complexity, unevenness, and inequality" latent in the city's expansion.

Kalb completed his MA in cultural anthropology at the Catholic University of Nijmegen in 1988 before finishing his PhD in social sciences at the Universiteit Utrecht in 1995.

== Career ==
In addition to ongoing his teaching and research duties, Kalb has held numerous visiting professorships and research directorships across Europe and in the United States. In 1999, Kalb was a director of the Social Consequences of Economic Transformation in Eastern Europe program at the Institut für die Wissenschaften vom Menschen in Vienna, Austria. In 2015, Kalb was a distinguished visiting professor at the Graduate Center, CUNY in New York City as a part of the university's Advanced Research Collaborative initiative. Presently, alongside Chris Hann, Kalb directs the financialization research group at the Max Planck Institute for Social Anthropology, Halle, Germany.

== Work ==
Kalb's work has addressed numerous topics including globalization, nationalism, labor history, and class. While he is known as a Marxist anthropologist, Kalb's scholarship has often utilized historical evidence in addition to or in lieu of fieldwork, leading to him having been described by historian Michael Hanagan as "an anthropologist, equally at home with historical methods and debates". His empirical work has been mainly on economic transformations, class, and popular and political culture in Europe, in particular the Netherlands and Central and Eastern Europe.

=== Expanding Class: Power and Everyday Politics in Industrial Communities, The Netherlands, 1850–1950 ===
In Expanding Class: Power and Everyday Politics in Industrial Communities, The Netherlands, 1850–1950, Kalb examines 20th century social and economic developments in the Brabant region of the Netherlands through a case study of the region's predominately Catholic working-class families. Following E.P. Thompson, Kalb develops what he describes as a relational approach to class that attempts to explain worker quiescence through an analysis of the Brabant region's cultural and social circumstances as well as productive relations. Charles Tilly argues that the brand of relational analysis proposed in Expanding Class "incorporates some coercion and pays considerable attention to culture, but resolutely rejects both functional and competitive accounts of inequality. Kalb centers his explanation on continuously negotiated social relations. His investigation thereby provides a promising model for further anthropological work".

=== Focaal ===
Kalb is the founding editor of anthropology journal Focaal: Journal of Global and Historical Anthropology, as well as the current FocaalBlog editor. Focaal focuses primarily on intersecting anthropological and historical debates examining local case studies within a global context. According to the journal's website, Focaal advocates for "an approach that rests in the simultaneity of ethnography, processual analysis, local insights, and global vision".

== Bibliography ==
=== Books ===
- Value and Worthlessness: The Rise of the Populist Right and Other Disruptions in the Anthropology of Capitalism. New York, Oxford: Berghahn Books. 2025. doi:10.3167/9781805398226. ISBN 978-1-80539-822-6.
- with Hann, Chris (2020). Financialization: Relational Approaches. New York, Oxford: Berghahn Books. doi:10.3167/9781789207514. ISBN 978-1789207514.
- Expanding Class: Power and Everyday Politics in Industrial Communities; The Netherlands 1850-1950. Comparative and International Working-Class History. Durham: Duke University Press. 1998. ISBN 978-0-8223-2022-7.

=== Edited volumes ===
- Kalb, Don, ed. (2024). Insidious Capital: Frontlines of Value at the End of a Global Cycle. New York, Oxford: Berghahn. doi:10.3167/9781805391555. ISBN 978-1-80539-155-5.
- Kalb, Don; Mollona, Massimiliano, eds. (2018). Worldwide Mobilizations: Class Struggles and Urban Commoning. New York, Oxford: Berghahn Books. doi:10.3167/9781785339066. ISBN 978-1-78533-906-6.
- Carrier, James G.; Kalb, Don, eds. (2015). Anthropologies of Class: Power, Practice, and Inequality. Cambridge: Cambridge University Press. ISBN 978-1107087415.
- with Halmai, Gábor, eds. (2011). Headlines of Nation, Subtexts of Class: Working-class Populism and the Return of the Repressed in Neoliberal Europe. EASA Series. Vol. 15. Oxford: Berghahn Books. doi:10.3167/9780857452030. ISBN 978-0857452030.
- Kalb, Don; Tak, Herman, eds. (2005). Critical Junctions: Anthropology and History beyond the Cultural Turn. Oxford: Berghan Books. doi:10.3167/9781845450083. ISBN 978-1845450298.
- Kalb, Don; Pansters, Wil; Siebers, Hans, eds. (2004). Globalization and Development: Themes and Concepts in Current Research. Dordrecht: Kluwer Academic Publishers. ISBN 978-1402024740.
- Kalb, Don; van der Land, Marco; Staring, Richard; Van Steenbergen, Bart; Wilterdink, Nico, eds. (2000). The Ends of Globalization: Bringing Society Back In. Lanham: Rowman & Littlefield. ISBN 978-0847698851.

=== Selected articles ===
- Kalb, Don (2013). "Financialization and the capitalist moment: Marx versus Weber in the anthropology of global systems". American Ethnologist. 40 (2): 258–266. doi:10.1111/amet.12018.
- Kalb, Don (2012). "Thinking about neoliberalism as if the crisis was actually happening". Social Anthropology. 20 (3): 318–330. doi:10.1111/j.1469-8676.2012.00215.x.
- Visser, Oane; Kalb, Don (2010). "Financialised Capitalism Soviet Style? Varieties of State Capture and Crisis". European Journal of Sociology. 51 (2): 171–194. doi:10.1017/S000397561000010X. hdl:2066/90377. S2CID 145206501.
- Kalb, Don (2009). "Conversations with a Polish populist : Tracing hidden histories of globalization, class, and dispossession in postsocialism (and beyond)". American Ethnologist. 36 (2): 207–223. doi:10.1111/j.1548-1425.2009.01131.x.
- Kalb, Don (2005). "From flows to violence". Anthropological Theory. 5 (2): 176–204. doi:10.1177/1463499605053994. S2CID 145535313.

=== Selected Book Chapters ===
- Kalb, Don (2017). "Regimes of Value and Worthlessness: How Two Subaltern Stories Speak". In Narotzky, Susana; Goddard, Victoria (eds.). Work and Livelihoods: History, Ethnography and Models in Times of Crisis. New York: Routledge. pp. 123–136. ISBN 978-1138813984.
- Kalb, Don (2015). "Introduction: class and the new anthropological holism". In Carrier, James G.; Kalb, Don (eds.). Anthropologies of Class: Power, Practice, and Inequality. Cambridge: Cambridge University Press. pp. 1–27. ISBN 978-1107087415.
- Kalb, Don (2014). "Class". In Nonini, Donald M. (ed.). A Companion to Urban Anthropology. Chichester: John Wiley & Sons Ltd. pp. 157–176. doi:10.1002/9781118378625.ch9. ISBN 978-1444330106.
- Kalb, Don (2001). "Globalism and postsocialist prospects". In Hann, C.M. (ed.). Postsocialism: ideals, ideologies, and practices in Eurasia. London: Routledge. pp. 317–334. ISBN 978-0415262583.
