= Chris Hann =

British social anthropologist (born 1953)

Christopher Michael Hann (born 4 August 1953) is a British social anthropologist who has done field research in socialist and post-socialist Eastern Europe (especially in Hungary and Poland) and the Turkic-speaking world (Black Sea coast and Xinjiang, N-W China). His main theoretical interests lie in economic anthropology, religion (especially Eastern Christianity), and long-term history (the Eurasian landmass). After holding university posts in Cambridge and Canterbury, UK, Hann has worked since 1999 in Germany as one of the founding Directors of the Max Planck Institute for Social Anthropology in Halle/Saale. Hann has made significant contributions to the subfield of economic anthropology.

== Early life ==
Hann was born in Cardiff, the first child of parents (of mixed Irish, English and Welsh ancestry) themselves born and brought up in the Welsh capital. In the same year the family moved to the new town of Cwmbran, in Monmouthshire. Hann was brought up in a monolingual English-speaking environment immediately south of the “Border Country” of Raymond Williams.

== Career and field research ==
Hann won a Welsh Foundation Scholarship to study politics, philosophy, and economics at Jesus College, Oxford University, graduating with a first class degree in 1974. He specialised in Eastern Europe, which he first visited with an Inter-rail ticket in 1972. After Oxford, Hann was a graduate student at Corpus Christi College, Cambridge. In 1974-5 he took the Certificate course in social anthropology, choosing Melanesia as his ethnographic option. For his doctorate, Jack Goody advised him to continue with the regional specialisation he already had in Eastern Europe. He spent the years 1975-77 learning Hungarian and doing field research on the Danube-Tisza interfluve, defending his thesis in 1979. He still visits the village of Tázlár regularly, arguing that the micro-level developments he tracks there reflect the efflorescence and demise of a distinctive “market socialism”.

Hann opened a new field site in Southern Poland in 1978–9 with the aim of comparing “peasant” adaptations in a non-collectivised socialist society with his Hungarian observations. Fieldwork in the Carpathians coincided with food shortages, the rise of Solidarity, and national political crisis. Apart from the insights gained into the dysfunctionality of Polish socialism, working in a region inhabited by an east Slav minority allowed Hann to develop new interests in ethnicity and national identity. He followed this up in the 1990s with research into Polish-Ukrainian relations and the predicament of the Greek Catholic Church in the border city of Przemyśl.

Hann is married to Ildikó Bellér-Hann, who teaches the societies and cultures of Central Asia and Western China at the Institute of Regional and Cross-Cultural Studies of the University of Copenhagen. They have carried out field research together in Anatolia (east Black Sea coast) and in the Xinjiang Uyghur Autonomous Region, N-W China. Hann's main contribution to the Turkey project focused on smallholders who gave up subsistence farming in order to grow tea as a cash crop in the Rize region. In rural Xinjiang he investigated economic transformations, while also engaging with religion and ethnic relations.

Research in all four field sites (Hungary, Poland, Turkey and Xinjiang) began while Hann was based in Cambridge, where he was a Fellow of Corpus Christi College and Lecturer in the Department of Social Anthropology. He left Cambridge in 1992 to become Professor of Social Anthropology at the University of Kent (Canterbury). After two years as a Fellow at the Institute of Advanced Study in Berlin, in 1999 Hann moved to Halle as a Founding Director of the Max Planck Institute for Social Anthropology.

== Main interests ==
Hann's theoretical interests are closely related to his ethnographic research. He was a pioneer anthropological investigator of what he calls “Marxist-Leninist-Maoist socialism”. Since 1990 he has traced the distinctive pathways of “postsocialism” within a global political economy. Hann has been critical of terms like “market economy” and “civil society”, predicting at an early stage that the slogans and strategies on which foreign advisers and local elites agreed would not deliver the goods that the mass of citizens hoped for. The main theme of his team research in the first years of the Max Planck Institute for Social Anthropology (1999-2005) was the privatization of collective property. This was followed by collective research into religious transformation after socialism (2003-2010). In his personal contributions to this work Hann frequently draws on his knowledge of the Greek Catholics of Central Europe to critique a Western, essentially Protestant, bias in the Anglophone “anthropology of Christianity”.

Another persistent strand in Hann's work concerns the connections between anthropology and history. He edited When History Accelerates in honour of Paul Stirling – a collection that focused on recent and contemporary history. After joining the Max Planck Society, Hann began to address longer-term patterns, acknowledging debts to Ernest Gellner, his head of department in Cambridge in the 1980s, and Jack Goody, the supervisor of his doctoral thesis. Hann has sought to locate recent socialism and postsocialism in the context of the “Eurasian miracle” that accompanied the rise of cities in the late Bronze Age. Adapting the work of Goody, he argues that the last three millennia of Eurasian history may be thought of as a dialectic between market exchange (culminating in capitalism) and redistribution (culminating in Marxist-Leninist-Maoist socialism, and expressed more attractively in democratic variants of these doctrines). The key concepts here are borrowed from Karl Polanyi. In a large project funded by the European Research Council he has compared civilisations across the Eurasian landmass with reference to the moral economy of small businesses.

== Collaboration ==
Hann has cooperated systematically with scholars whose regional and theoretical interests differ from his own. In economic anthropology he has maintained a friendship with Keith Hart that dates back to the 1980s, when they were colleagues in Cambridge. He has also worked closely with other leading figures in the (sub)discipline, including Stephen Gudeman, with whom he led the “Economy and Ritual” postdoctoral research group in Halle in 2009–2012). More recently he has co-led similar groups with Catherine Alexander and Jonathan Parry (on “Industry and Inequality in Eurasia”, 2012–2015) and with Don Kalb (on “Financialization”, 2015–2018).

Together with Faculty colleagues in history and archaeology at the Martin Luther University Halle-Wittenberg (where he is Honorary Professor), in 2012 Hann launched an International Max Planck Research School for the “Anthropology, Archaeology and History of Eurasia” (ANARCHIE) in 2012. With Hermann Goltz of the Faculty of Theology, he organized an international conference on Eastern Christians, the papers of which were published in 2010. He was a part-time collaborator in Thomas Hylland Eriksen’s “Overheating” project at the University of Oslo, a multi-dimensional investigation of contemporary globalization. In 2016 Hann initiated “MAX-CAM: Centre for the Study of Ethics, Human Economy and Social Change”, a collaboration between the Max Planck Institute for Social Anthropology, the Max Planck Institute for the Study of Religious and Ethnic Diversity (Göttingen, Peter van der Veer), and the Division of Social Anthropology at the University of Cambridge (James Laidlaw and Joel Robbins). The Centre became operational in January 2017.

== Honours and awards ==
Chris Hann was elected a member of the Berlin-Brandenburg Academy of Sciences in 2008. In 1991 he was awarded the Curl Essay Prize and in 2015 the Rivers Memorial Medal – both by the Royal Anthropological Institute (London). In 2019 he was awarded the Huxley Memorial Medal of the Royal Anthropological Institute. In April 2020 Chris Hann was appointed Fellow of the Learned Society of Wales.

== Bibliography ==
- Hann, Chris, Beller-Hann, Ildiko: Turkish Region: State, market and social identities on the east Black Sea coast, Oxford. James Currey, 2000.
- Hann, Chris (ed.): Postsocialism: ideals, ideologies and practices in Eurasia, London: Routledge, 2002.
- Hann, Chris and Paul R. Magocsi (eds.): Galicia: a multicultured land Toronto [et al.]: Univ. of Toronto Press, 2005.
- Hann, Chris and Hermann Goltz: Introduction: the other Christianity? In: Chris Hann and Hermann Goltz (eds.). Eastern Christians in anthropological perspective, The Anthropology of Christianity 9. Berkeley [et al.]: University of California Press, pp. 1–29, 2010.
