= British Aerosol Manufacturers' Association =

The British Aerosol Manufacturers' Association
- Abbreviation: BAMA
- Formation: 1961
- Legal status: Non-profit company
- Purpose: Aerosol propellants in the United Kingdom
- Location: 1 Viewpoint, Office Village, Babbage Road, Stevenage, Herts, SG1 2EQ
- Region served: UK
- Members: Around 74 companies
- Director: Patrick Heskins
- Main organ: BAMA Executive Committee (chairman - Tony Brealey)
- Affiliations: Fédération Européenne des Aérosols, Alliance of Industry Associations
- Website: BAMA

The British Aerosol Manufacturers' Association (BAMA) is a UK trade association based in Stevenage representing companies involved in the aerosol supply chain, including suppliers of components and ingredients to fillers and marketers.

== History and objectives ==
Aerosol can structure

It was established in 1961. 2008 marked 80 years since Rotheim's patent for aerosols was approved in the UK and BAMA as the trade association, marked this through a trade and consumer public relations programme and by producing a series of marketing materials for member companies. BAMA also provides information to local authorities, households and businesses on recycling aerosols.

BAMA's aims are to:

- Promote the aerosol and encourage innovation
- Set high standards in safety, good manufacturing practice and on environmental issues
- Present industry's view to legislators, the media and key opinion formers

== Members ==
Members include:

- AkzoNobel
- Beiersdorf
- DuPont
- GlaxoSmithKline
- ICI Paints
- Precision Valve - formed by Robert Abplanalp, inventor of the aerosol valve
- Procter & Gamble
- Reckitt Benckiser
- Rentokil Initial
- SC Johnson
- Unilever
- Swallowfield Plc
- Volcke Aerosol UK Ltd
