= Bhama =

Bhama could refer to:

- Satyabhama, a wife of the Hindu god Krishna
- Bhama Kurup, an Indian actress
- Bhama Srinivasan, an Indian-American mathematician

== See also ==
- Bhama Kalapam (disambiguation)
- Bama Vijayam (disambiguation)
- Sathyabhama (disambiguation)
- Bhama Sathyabhama, an Indian TV show
- Bhama Rukmani, a 1980 Indian film
- Rama Shama Bhama, a 2005 Indian film by Ramesh Aravind
- Bhama Asakhed Dam, in Karanjvihire, Khed, Maharashtra, India
