= Satyam (surname) =

Satyam is a Telugu given name. Notable people with the surname include:

- Satyam (1933–1989), Indian music composer
- Madhavapeddi Satyam (1922–2000), Indian singer and actor
- Vempati Chinna Satyam (1929–2012), Indian dancer
