= Alexander Raue =

German politician (born 1973)

Member of the Landtag of Saxony-Anhalt
- In office 12 April 2016 – 6 June 2021
- Preceded by: Uwe-Volkmar Köck
- Succeeded by: Christian Albrecht
- Constituency: Halle I

Personal details
- Born: 4 April 1973 (age 53) Halle (Saale)
- Party: Alternative for Germany (since 2014)
- Other political affiliations: Christian Democratic Union (2000–2013)

Alexander Raue (born 4 April 1973 in Halle (Saale)) is a German politician. From 2016 to 2021 ad again since 2026 he is a member of the Landtag of Saxony-Anhalt. From 2014 to 2016, he served as treasurer of the AfD Saxony-Anhalt.

Raue was member of CDU. In 2016 he signed the so calles „Erfurter Resolution“ of Der Flügel, the far-right völkisch movement within the right-wing AfD. In the same year he got elected to Landtag.

Raue tried to stop the construction of an ismalic community center and said, once had to „“to impose one’s own culture”. Anyone arriving from abroad with the intention of establishing their own cultures is “highly unwelcome.” In 2026 he git eletced again as a member of Landtag.
