= Momodu Bama =

Nigerian militant

Momodu Bama (died 14 August 2013), also known by the alias Abu Saad, was the second in command of the militant Islamist group Boko Haram. Before his death in August 2013 the Nigerian government placed a $155,000 bounty for his capture. His main field of knowledge was manning anti-aircraft guns. He was the son of Abatcha Flatari. Prior to his killing, the Nigerian army seized several homemade explosive devices from him as well as rocket propelled grenades.
