= Postsocialism =

Academic study of states after the fall or decline of socialism

Postsocialism is the academic study of states after the decline or fall of socialism, especially in Eastern Europe and Asia. The "socialism" in postsocialism is not based on a Marxist conception of socialism but rather, especially in the Eastern European context, on the idea of "actually existing socialism". Scholars of postsocialist states maintain that, even if the political and economic systems in place did not adhere to orthodox Marxist ideas of "socialism", these systems were real and had real effects on cultures, society, and individuals' subjectivities. Scholars of postsocialism often draw from other theoretical frameworks like postcolonialism and focus especially on the evolution of labor relations, gender roles, and ethnic and religious political affiliations. The idea of postsocialism has also been criticized, however, for placing so much emphasis on the impact of socialism while the term socialism remains difficult to define, especially if extended beyond Eastern Europe.

== Overview ==
Postsocialism focuses on the lasting cultural and social effects of actually existing socialism, and how the legacies of socialism interact with the free-market or neoliberal policies of the 1990s. As an analytical framework, postsocialism emphasizes the importance of the socialist state and provides a critical perspective on the "Western economic and political forms" that arose in its place. Although the terms postsocialist and postcommunist are mostly interchangeable, postcommunism focuses more on the institutional and formal changes, whereas postsocialism is generally more concerned with culture, subjectivities, and everyday life.

Postsocialist scholars, like postcolonial theorists, are concerned with the tensions between Western scholarship, including their own, on the regions they study and the local scholarship. Postsocialist scholars have framed some of their studies in response to structural models projecting a "transition" between a socialist state and a democratic market economy. Postsocialist scholars criticize these studies, known as "transitology," for being teleological, based excessively in Western ideas, and simplistic. Instead of "transition," postsocialist scholars prefer to describe "transformations" resulting from the end of socialism, avoiding the implicit endpoint contained in "transition" and allowing for many different changes to happen simultaneously and in complementary or contradictory ways. Some postsocialist scholars, like Katherine Verdery, posit that the turning point of 1989 should be considered a turning point not just for formerly socialist states but for the world more broadly, because the existence of these "socialist" states was central to geopolitics, global economics, and to the self-definition of non-socialist states as well.

== Postsocialism and academic fields ==
=== Postcolonialism ===
Like postsocialism, postcolonial theory provides a critical perspective on the cultural and social legacies of a hegemonic system, focuses on continuities through periods of structural political change, and critiques mainstream Western scholarship. Scholars of postsocialism such as Katherine Verdery, Sharad Chari, and Jill Owczarak, have all explored the potential overlaps between postsocialism and postcolonialism and the ways that these theories can inform one another.

There are some key differences between postsocialism and postcolonialism. First, although influential thinkers like Frantz Fanon and Aimé Césaire wrote texts during the height of decolonization, postcolonial studies emerged as a field largely in the 1980s, while postsocialism emerged in the mid-1990s, only a few years after the fall of most communist states. Owczarzak claims that postcolonialism has a clearer theoretical grounding while most studies of postsocialism are geographically unified because they focus on Eastern European states. Notably, Arif Dirlik had developed the concept of postsocialism in the context of Chinese studies prior to the fall of socialism in Eastern Europe but did so based on a significantly different definition of postsocialism.

Verdery and Chari present three main ways of combining postsocialism and postcolonialism or thinking "between the posts." First, postsocialism and postcolonialism can be used to explore the relationship between "empire and capital," especially by drawing from studies of the "technologies of imperial power," studies of the relationship between empire and ethnic or nationalistic sentiment, and studies of neocolonialism and neoliberalism that explore "new kinds political and economic interventions into the affairs of formally sovereign states." Second, postsocialism and postcolonialism can be combined to undo the Cold War-era tendencies for studies of the "Three Worlds" to treat each "world" in isolation and rely on different fields for analyzing each one. And third, postsocialism can draw upon postcolonial theories of race to analyze the promotion of "internal enemies" under socialism and the development of ethnonationalism in Eastern Europe. Verdery and Chari propose a unified perspective, "post-Cold War studies," that takes into account the impact of the Cold War on both the decolonization process and the progression and fall of socialism in Eastern Europe.

Owczarak focuses on two themes of postcolonialism that scholars use in analyzing postsocialism. First, scholars can draw on Edward Said's concept of Orientalism, as Eastern Europe has long "served as Western Europe's intermediary 'Other'" and has been perceived as relatively backward and in need of civilizing or educating. Second, postsocialist scholars can use the postcolonial concept of "hybridity," or "belonging to multiple worlds" to explore the ways in which Eastern European states are both "Eastern" and "Western." These analytical tools can help scholars take into account how analyses of and identities in Eastern Europe are formed with reference to both Western European and local concerns.

=== Postsocialism and gender ===
Issues relating to gender, especially that of abortion, have become major political flashpoints in postsocialist states and gender is a major focus of postsocialist studies. Many postsocialist states have powerful conservative, natalist, anti-feminist political movements. Postsocialist scholars explain these developments as being to some extent a backlash against what many perceived as the "feminizing," or "mothering" nature of the socialist state, which provided a great deal of services for the family and became associated with the term "feminism" itself. The developments under postsocialism, then, involve "compelling women back into the nurturing and care-giving roles 'natural' to their sex and restoring to men their 'natural' family authority." The retreat of the state from the public domain—in terms of reproductive rights, guaranteed employment, and social care—also led to a loss of work and engagement in civil society for women, in what Frances Pine similarly calls a "retreat to the domestic."

Scholars of postsocialism have also analyzed the interaction between different visions of feminism. Analysis from Western feminists and aid from Western feminist NGOs has met with some resistance from Eastern European feminists who embrace ideas of femininity and gender difference and criticized Western observers for not understanding local gender dynamics. At the same time, some younger Eastern European feminists have turned to Western institutions and ideas for inspiration, support, or legitimation, adding a generational tension to gender issues in the region.

=== Postsocialism and capitalism ===
Scholars such as anthropologist Nicolette Makovicky see utility in interrogating postsocialist societies as specific examples of local capitalism and variants of neo-liberal models of governance. In emphasising the long-term and ongoing effect of economic changes, Makovicky and others who employ ethnographic approaches draw attention to postsocialism as a specific form of dispossession, remaking of subjecthood, and continuing temporal discontinuity. Scholars inspired by critical geography and anthropology use the concept of dispossession to open up the discussion of postsocialism as producing specific forms of illiberal populism, forms of precarious emotional citizenry, and socio-economically generated nostalgia.

=== Postsocialism and China ===
Although the Chinese Communist Party (CCP) is still in power, the Reform and Opening policies and concomitant changes to China's economy and society have led some scholars to use the label postsocialist to describe China as well. Arif Dirlik first used this term in 1989 in an attempt to theorize the "condition of ideological contradiction and uncertainty" present in a state that continued to call itself socialist (with the term "socialism with Chinese characteristics") while undertaking capitalist economic reforms. Dirlik argues that reform in China created a tension between the CCP's continued self-definition as socialist and its use of "socialist revolution" in fostering nationalism, and the internal and external pressures from integration with the capitalist world economy. For Dirlik, postsocialism is a way of describing the "discursive struggle between present-day capitalism and 'actually existing socialism' to appropriate the future."

Dirlik's conception of postsocialism also rejects the idea of a linear transition from socialism to capitalist market economics, but, unlike the later Eastern Europe-focused scholarship of postsocialism, Dirlik's theory is focused on political and economic visions rather than culture and everyday life. Thus, Dirlik's theory is not meant to shift studies on China in a particular direction permanently, but rather to step away from definitive labels and "rethink socialism" and its tensions with and ties to capitalism.

In 1994, Paul Pickowicz proposed a different understanding of postsocialism in China based on film and culture, looking from the "bottom up" rather than top down. Analyzing the 1980s films of director Huang Jianxin, Pickowicz argues for a postsocialist "identity" and "cultural condition" that is shared across China and formerly socialist states in Eastern Europe, consisting mainly of a "negative, dystopian" view of society and a sense of "profound disillusionment," "hopelessness," "alienation," and a lack of a positive vision or hope for change. Like scholars of Eastern European postsocialism, Pickowicz focuses on the experience of socialism as reflected through culture, but Pickowicz's postsocialism has an added dimension: because the CCP is still in charge, postsocialist artworks "'subvert' ... the oppressive traditional socialist system by deconstructing the mythology of Chinese socialism."

Since the emergence of postsocialist studies relating to Eastern Europe, some scholars of China have adapted these studies to China. Kevin Latham, following scholars such as Verdery, argues for describing China during the Reform Era as "postsocialist" rather than a "hybrid version of socialism" because postsocialist studies highlight both the "radical breaks and the continuities that exist alongside each other and mutually inform one another." Latham also follows Dirlik, however, in defining postsocialism as not signifying a "straightforward 'after' in either logical or chronological terms," meaning that postsocialist China is not just defined by transformations from the earlier era but also by institutions and sensibilities that remained the same. Latham also argues that although "transitology" or a focus on China's "transition" to capitalism is an inappropriate frame of analysis, it is also important that "the notion of transition in the local rhetoric plays an important role in maintaining Party legitimacy." In the 1990s, according to Latham, the CCP used deliberately vague ideas of "transition" to elicit support for continued reform. The people could persevere through the various problems created by Reform if something better was at the other end.

== Criticism ==
A basic criticism of postsocialism, generally acknowledged by its proponents, is that as the "socialism" from postsocialism gets further away, postsocialist analysis risks ignoring or misunderstanding newer developments. As anthropologist Caroline Humphrey notes, postsocialism is also open to the criticism that it removes agency from local actors by "[implying] constraints on the freedom of people in these countries to determine their own futures." Nevertheless, Humphrey supports continued use of the term because "actually existing socialism" was "deeply pervasive" and "had a certain foundational unity" and its influence persists and remains inadequately understood.

Political scientist Jordan Gans-Morse has criticized postsocialist scholars (he uses the term "postcommunist," but refers to both) for exaggerating the prevalence of teleological narratives of Eastern European political and economic development, and for conflating "transitology" and "modernization theory" when the two were distinct. Gans-Morse acknowledges some of the criticisms from postsocialist scholars but argues that theories of "ideal-type sequences of transition" do not actually predict or prescribe a certain endpoint but allow scholars to analyze how and why a state has deviated from the model, a form of analysis that might be preferable to open-ended "transformations." Gans-Morse also argues that alternative theories of change in these states can be used as points of comparison, such as "revolution, institutional collapse followed by state (re)building, or decolonization." Gans-Morse's criticism, notably, is aimed at building a better understanding of these states for the field of "comparative politics," a field more inclined toward the kind of ideal-type modeling he defends than anthropology, the field of many postsocialist scholars.

Political scientist David Ost, while not criticizing the notion of postsocialism itself (he uses the term "postcommunism" throughout his text), has argued based on his study of unions that "postcommunism is over" and the "global economy is here." Ost argues that unions under postsocialism were "'producerists' par excellence," interested in protecting the interests of skilled workers, trimming the workforce of unskilled or underused (often female) labor, and believing that the market would value and reward their skilled work. The sign that postsocialism ended, to Ost, is that unions returned to being class-based, with many of the postsocialist transformations complete and a new generation of union leaders came of age in the era of "actually existing capitalism" and its exploitation of labor. Ost projects the emergence of a "divided labor movement" in the shadow now of postsocialism, with skilled labor unions more successful at defending their class interests and other unions struggling. Thus, for Ost, the region of Eastern Europe still requires its own frame of analysis, but this frame of analysis should focus on the legacy of postsocialism, not socialism, because the structural transformation from state socialism to a capitalist market economy was complete and the effects of that transformation were now shaping the labor movement.

Martin Müller has more recently mounted a theoretical critique of postsocialism, arguing that postsocialism is not only marginal in social and cultural theory but it has "lost its object," in that socialism is not as important to contemporary developments, and it has "problematic conceptual and political implications." Müller critiques postsocialism specifically on five points. First, postsocialism refers to a "disappearing object," and is decreasingly useful at analyzing new developments. Second, postsocialism "privileges rupture," centering itself on the fall of socialism and thus emphasizing breakage over continuity and creating a unity among "socialisms" that did not necessarily exist. Third, postsocialism is overly attached to Central and Eastern Europe and the former Soviet Union, and it is limited by not taking into account "a relational, deterritorialized view of space" appropriate to a globalizing world. Fourth, postsocialism is "Orientalizing," in that it "reflects specifically Western discourses, approaches, and knowledge claims" and fails to live up to its injunction to listen to "native" scholars and theories. Fifth, postsocialism "risks becoming politically disempowering" by suggesting that socialism is "over and done with" and foreclosing the possibility of a new, non-Marxist-Leninist variant.

== See also ==
- Apparatchik
- Business oligarch
- Informal economy
- Nomenklatura
- Post-Islamism
- Post-leftism
- Post-Soviet states
- Second economy of the Soviet Union

== Bibliography ==
- Arpagian, Jasmine; Aitken, Stuart C. (2018). "Without Space: The Politics of Precarity and Dispossession in Postsocialist Bucharest". Annals of the American Association of Geographers. 108 (2): 445–453. Bibcode:2018AAAG..108..445A. doi:10.1080/24694452.2017.1368986. S2CID 134929305.
- Burawoy, Michael, and Katherine Verdery. "Introduction." In Uncertain Transition: Ethnographies of Change in the Postsocialist World, edited by Katherine Verdery and Michael Burawoy, 1–17. Lanham: Rowman & Littlefield Publishers, Inc., 1999.
- Buyandelgeriyn, Manduhai (2008). "Post-Post-Transition Theories: Walking on Multiple Paths". Annual Review of Anthropology. 37: 235–250. doi:10.1146/annurev.anthro.37.081407.085214. S2CID 144159340.
- Chari, Sharad, and Katherine Verdery. "Thinking between the Posts: Postcolonialism, Postsocialism, and Ethnography after the Cold War." Comparative Studies in Society and History 51, no. 1 (2009): 6–34.
- Dirlik, Arif (1989). "Postsocialism? Reflections on "socialism with Chinese characteristics"". Bulletin of Concerned Asian Scholars. 21: 33–44. doi:10.1080/14672715.1989.10413190.
- Gans-Morse, Jordan (2004). "Searching for Transitologists: Contemporary Theories of Post-Communist Transitions and the Myth of a Dominant Paradigm". Post-Soviet Affairs. 20 (4): 320–349. doi:10.2747/1060-586X.20.4.320. S2CID 37020502.
- Hann, C. M., ed. Postsocialism: Ideals, Ideologies and Practices in Eurasia. 1 edition. London ; New York: Routledge, 2001.
- Humphrey, Caroline. "Does the Category 'Postsocialist' Still Make Sense?" In Postsocialism: Ideals, Ideologies and Practices in Eurasia, edited by C. M. Hann, 12–15. London: Routledge, 2001.
- Kalb, Don (2018). "Upscaling Illiberalism: Class, Contradiction, and the Rise and Rise of the Populist Right in Post-socialist Central Europe". Fudan J. Hum. Soc. Sci. 11 (3): 303–321. doi:10.1007/s40647-018-0221-3. S2CID 256394133.
- Latham, Kevin. "Rethinking Chinese Consumption: Social Palliatives and the Rhetorics of Transition in Postsocialist China." In Postsocialism: Ideals, Ideologies and Practices in Eurasia, edited by C. M. Hann, 217–37. London: Routledge, 2001.
- Makovicky, Nicolette. "Introduction: Me, Inc? Untangling Neoliberalism, Personhood, and Postsocialism," in Neoliberalism, Personhood, and Postsocialism: Enterprising Selves in Changing Economies. edited by Nicolette Mackovicky, Ashgate, 2014.
- Morris, Jeremy (2014). "The Warm Home of Cacti and Other Soviet Memories: Russian Workers Reflect on the Socialist Period". Central Europe. 12 (1): 16–31. doi:10.1179/1479096314Z.00000000020. S2CID 144293036.
- Morris, Jeremy. Everyday Post-Socialism: Working-Class Communities in the Russian Margins. Springer, 2016.
- Müller, Martin (2019). "Goodbye, Postsocialism!". Europe-Asia Studies. 71 (4): 533–550. doi:10.1080/09668136.2019.1578337. hdl:10995/75251.
- Ost, David. "The Consequences of Postcommunism: Trade Unions in Eastern Europe's Future." East European Politics and Societies and Cultures 23, no. 1 (February 2009): 13–33. https://doi.org/10.1177/0888325408326791.
- Owczarzak, Jill. "Introduction: Postcolonial Studies and Postsocialism in Eastern Europe." Focaal 2009, no. 53 (April 1, 2009): 3–19. https://doi.org/10.3167/fcl.2009.530101. Pickowicz, Paul G. "Huang Jianxin and the Notion of Postsocialism." In New Chinese Cinemas: Forms, Identities, Politics, edited by Nick Browne, Vivian Sobchack, Esther Yau, and Paul G. Pickowicz. Cambridge University Press, 1994. https://doi.org/10.1017/CBO9781139174121.005.
- Pine, Frances. "Retreat to the Household? Gendered Domains in Postsocialist Poland." In Postsocialism: Ideals, Ideologies and Practices in Eurasia, edited by C. M. Hann, 95–113. London: Routledge, 2001.
- Verdery, Katherine. What Was Socialism, and What Comes Next? Princeton Studies in Culture/Power/History. Princeton: Princeton University Press, 1996.
- Verdery, Katherine, and Michael Burawoy, eds. Uncertain Transition: Ethnographies of Change in the Postsocialist World. Lanham: Rowman & Littlefield Publishers, Inc., 1999.
