= Max Planck Institute for Social Anthropology =

German research institute

Coordinates: 51°29′50″N 11°57′35″E

- Abbreviation: MPIEF
- Formation: 1999; 27 years ago
- Type: Scientific institute
- Purpose: Research in sociocultural anthropology and social change
- Headquarters: Halle, Germany
- Managing director: Ursula Rao
- Directors: Marie-Claire Foblets; Chris Hann (retired); Ursula Rao; Biao Xiang
- Key people: Chris Hann and Günther Schlee, founding directors
- Parent organization: Max Planck Society
- Staff: >175
- Website: (in English) (in German)

The Max Planck Institute for Social Anthropology (German: Max-Planck-Institut für ethnologische Forschung) is a scientific research institute founded in 1999 in Halle, Germany. It is one of the institutes of the Max Planck Society.

== Organization ==
The institute consists of three departments and several independent research groups.

=== Law and Anthropology ===
Headed by Prof. Dr. Marie-Claire Foblets, the Department of Law and Anthropology was established in 2012 to focus on the effects of societies and cultures towards law and politics and vice versa. This department also looks at how scholars of this specific discipline might take responsibility for implications surrounding the interplay of these societal factors.

=== Anthropology of Politics and Governance ===
Headed by Prof. Dr. Ursula Rao, the Department of Anthropology of Politics and Governance brings together a group of scholars undertaking research in the form of in-depth case studies in Asia, Africa and Europe focusing on the tactics, strategies, and motivations that shape political action in times of perceived crisis. Case studies focus on programmes and initiatives that aim to shape the future by proposing new ways of managing complexity and caring for relations in a more-than-human world.

=== Anthropology of Economic Experimentation ===
Headed by Prof. Dr. Biao Xiang, the Department of Anthropology of Economic Experimentation focuses on a wide range of political economy issues, including state-society relations, labour, social reproduction, and mobility governance, through the lens of migration.

== Max Planck Law ==
The institute (department of law and anthropology) is part of the research network Max Planck Law.

== Management ==
The Max Planck Institute for Social Anthropology is mainly represented by the following people:

Directors

- Prof. Dr. Marie-Claire Foblets
- Prof. Dr. Ursula Rao
- Prof. Dr. Biao Xiang

Fellow

- Burkhard Schnepel

Services

- Bettina Mann (Research Coordinator)
- Anja Neuner (Head Librarian)

== Controversies ==
=== Norman Finkelstein ===
In January 2017, the Department of Law and Anthropology has invited the controversial American activist and political scientist Norman Finkelstein as a visiting scholar. The Max Planck Institute for Social Anthropology has thus been criticized for providing a platform for a controversial speaker. In a statement the Max Planck Institute said that the purpose of Finkelstein's invitation to the Institute was to engage in a dialogue with him to discuss his work within an academic context. The research institute is dedicated to basic research where controversy cannot be ruled out; controversy is a "trait of academic work".

=== Ghassan Hage ===
Hage was terminated by the Max Planck Institute for Social Anthropology on 7 February 2024 over his comments on the Gaza war and the 2023 Hamas-led attack on Israel. On 7 October 2023, Hage published a text on his blog stating "the Palestinians, like all colonised people, are still proving that their capacity to resist is endless. They don't only dig tunnels. They can fly above walls."

The Max Planck Society published a press release, stating that many of the views he had shared via social media after the 2023 Hamas-led attack on Israel are incompatible with their core values and that "racism, anti-Semitism, islamophobia, discrimination, hatred and agitation have no place in the Max Planck Society". Hage rejected any accusation in a statement.

Following the dismissal, global academic communities, including Israeli scholars, the German Association of Social and Cultural Anthropology, the British Society for Middle Eastern Studies, the European Association of Social Anthropologists, the American Anthropological Association, the Council for Humanities, Arts and Sciences and the Australian Anthropological Society rallied in support of Hage, urging the society to reverse its decision.
