= Frazer Lecture =

The Sir James George Frazer Memorial Lectureship in Social Anthropology is a British academic lecture series.

In 1920 a sum of £675 was raised by a committee of the University of Cambridge for the purpose of commemorating Sir James Frazer's contributions to learning. In accordance with the wishes of the subscribers, a Frazer Lectureship in Anthropology was founded, the annual income of the fund being assigned to the University of Oxford, University of Cambridge, University of Glasgow and University of Liverpool in rotation for this purpose.

== Lectures ==
=== Oxford Lectures ===
Date	Lecturer	Title	Publication
17 May 1922	E.S. Hartland	The evolution of kinship: an African study	ISBN 0-8486-0308-7
27 May 1926	Alexandre Moret	La mise à mort du Dieu en Égypte	ISBN 0-8486-0308-7
22 February 1930	Paul Rivet	Les Océaniens	ISBN 0-8486-0308-7
10 May 1934	H.J. Rose	Concerning parallels	WorldCat
23 May 1938	J.H. Hutton	A primitive philosophy of life	WorldCat
5 May 1942	R.M. Dawkins	Soul and body in the folklore of modern Greece	JSTOR
1 May 1947	H.J. Fleure	Some aspects of British civilization	WorldCat
21 November 1950	Henri Frankfort	The problem of similarity in ancient Near-Eastern religions	WorldCat
28 October 1954	Isaac Schapera	The sin of Cain	JSTOR
30 October 1958	Louis Dumont	Le renoncement dans les religions de l’Inde	ISBN 0-226-16963-4
30 October 1962	W.K.C. Guthrie	The lesser world: some implications of the microcosmic view of man in Greek thought	WorldCat
18 October 1966	Denise Paulme-Schaeffner	Sur deux thèmes d’origine de la mort en Afrique occidentale	JSTOR
19 November 1970	Claude Lévi-Strauss	Myth and ritual	ISBN 0-226-47496-8 audio
3 December 1974	G.S. Kirk	Adonis: a demi-god still divided	Unpublished
30 November 1978	James Littlejohn	Magic boughs	Unpublished
28 October 1982	Sir Edmund Leach	Kingship and divinity	manuscript Open Access
7 May 1987	G.E.R. Lloyd	Early Greek science and the limits of rationality	ISBN 0-521-36680-1
6 November 1991	David John Parkin	Nemi in the modern world: return of the exotic?	JSTOR
16 May 1996	Nancy D. Munn	Excluded spaces: the figure in the Australian Aboriginal landscape	JSTOR
9 May 2000	J.D.Y. Peel	Time and difference in the anthropology of religion	Unpublished
17 September 2005	Veena Das	Ethics of the ordinary: figures of life and law in the context of urban poverty	

=== Cambridge Lectures ===
Date	Lecturer	Title	Publication
26 November 1923	John Roscoe	Immigrants and their influence in the lake region of Central Africa	ISBN 0-8486-0308-7
2 March 1927	R.R. Marett	The diffusion of culture	ISBN 0-8486-0308-7
26 November 1931	Sir Arthur Evans	The earlier religion of Greece in the light of Cretan discoveries	ISBN 0-8486-0308-7
14 May 1935	A.H. Gardiner	The attitude of the ancient Egyptians to death and the dead	Worldcat
24 February 1939	A.R. Radcliffe-Brown	Taboo	WorldCat
26 May 1943	J.L. Myres	Mediterranean culture	WorldCat
13 May 1948	E.E. Evans-Pritchard	The divine kingship of the Shilluk of the Nilotic Sudan	WorldCat
14 May 1952	Christoph von Fürer-Haimendorf	The after-life in Indian tribal belief	JSTOR
7 March 1955	Raymond Firth	The fate of the soul: an interpretation of some primitive concepts	WorldCat
5 March 1959	Monica Wilson	Divine kings and the 'breath of men'	WorldCat
6 May 1963	Kenneth Little	Voluntary associations and African social change	ISBN 0-521-09263-9
10 March 1967	Lucy Mair	Witchcraft and sorcery	ISBN 0-303-74622-X
18 November 1971	Fred Eggan	The rituals of headhunting in the mountain province, Philippines	manuscript
5 March 1976	Mary Douglas	Mistletoe	WorldCat
30 April 1982	M.N. Srinivas	Some reflections of the nature of the caste hierarchy	Sage
14 October 1983	Fredrik Barth	Symbol, worldview and creativity in some Inner New Guinea religious traditions	ISBN 0-521-34279-1
30 October 1987	Robin Horton	Back to Frazer?	ISBN 0-521-36087-0
5 March 1992	Godfrey Lienhardt	Frazer's anthropology: science and sensibility	JASO 24(1):1–12. video
22 November 1996	Alfred Gell	Royal ritual and coercive deference in Central India	JSTOR
11 May 2001	Chris Hann	Creeds, cultures and the 'witchery of music'	Blackwell
6 May 2004	Clifford Geertz	Shifting aims, moving targets: on the anthropology of religion	Blackwell audio
31 October 2008	Paul Rabinow	On the anthropology of the contemporary	video
17 October 2016	Jane Guyer	Anthropological Recuperations: Intellectual and Social	
20 May 2022	Matthew Engelke	Sovereign Bodies	

=== Glasgow Lectures ===
Date	Lecturer	Title	Publication
1924	W. J. Perry	The age of the gods	ISBN 0-8486-0308-7
7 September 1928	E.A. Westermarck	The study of popular sayings	ISBN 0-8486-0308-7
4 March 1932	Sir Arthur Keith	The Aryan theory as it stands to-day	ISBN 0-8486-0308-7
4 February 1936	W.R. Dawson	The magicians of pharaoh	JSTOR
1940	W.R. Halliday	The riddle of Apollo	
18 April 1944	Morris Ginsberg	Moral progress	WorldCat
6 December 1948	Alexander Murray Macbeath	The relationship of primitive morality and religion	WorldCat
28 April 1953	Max Gluckman	Rituals of rebellion in South-East Africa	ISBN 0-415-32983-3
28 November 1957	Meyer Fortes	The idea of destiny in West African religions	WorldCat
1959	J.G. Peristiany	Honour	
9 March 1967	Ian Cunnison	Analysis of an interregnum in the dynasty of the Eastern Lunda	Unpublished
29 January 1969	E.R. Dodds	Greek anthropology and the idea of progress	ISBN 0-19-814370-2
1972	No appointment		
28 February 1977	Ernest Gellner	A theory of nationalism	JSTOR
22 April 1981	Peter Worsley	Straw men and ideal types: non-Western medical systems	JSTOR
24 April 1985	Gilbert Lewis	The look of magic	JSTOR
18 April 1990	Peter Ucko	Whose culture is it anyway?	Sage
7 December 1993	Alexander Fenton	The food of the gods (Prestige, hunger and charity: aspects of status through food)	ISBN 978-0-85976-696-8
29 October 1997	Paul Henley	Narratives of the noble savage: history, ethnography and iconography in the construction of Amazonian alterity	manuscript
5 March 2002	Margaret A. Mackay	Why study Scottish folklore?	Unpublished
2006	No appointment		

=== Liverpool Lectures ===
Date	Lecturer	Title	Publication
27 November 1925	Bronisław Malinowski	Myth in primitive psychology	ISBN 0-8371-5954-7
18 October 1929	A.C. Haddon	The religion of a primitive people	ISBN 0-8486-0308-7
30 November 1933	C.G. Seligman	Egypt and Negro Africa: a study in divine kingship	ISBN 0-404-12138-1
7 January 1938	Henry Balfour	Spinners and weavers in anthropological research	WorldCat
1941	No appointment		
23 October 1946	E.W. Smith	Plans and people!: a dynamic science of man in the service of Africa	WorldCat
10 November 1949	V. Gordon Childe	Magic, craftsmanship and science	WorldCat
26 June 1953	E. Franklin Frazier	The evolution of religion among American Negroes	ISBN 0-8052-3508-6
20 November 1956	C. Daryll Forde	The context of belief: a consideration of fetishism among the Yakö	WorldCat
28 November 1961	E. Estyn Evans	Atlantic Europe: the pastoral heritage	ISBN 1-874675-48-1
3 February 1966	Audrey Richards	The changing world of the anthropologist	manuscript
21 October 1969	W.M. Williams	Ecological Models	manuscript
Nov 1973	Alan Macfarlane	Clio's task: the potential of historical anthropology	Online
1978	Georges Balandier	Africanist anthropology and the problem of power	Unpublished
29 April 1982	Marshall Sahlins	Captain James Cook; or, the dying god	ISBN 0-226-73357-2
1 May 1986	Marilyn Strathern	Out of context: the persuasive fictions of anthropology	JSTOR
1 November 1990	Maurice Bloch	The lessons and limitations of cognitive sciences for anthropology	JSTOR
Nov 1994	Jack Goody	Cognitive contradictions and universals: creation and evolution in oral cultures	Blackwell
20 November 1998	Joanna Overing	The efficacy of laughter: the ludic side of magic within Amazonian sociality	ISBN 0-203-19004-1
2003	No appointment		
