= Nations and Nationalism =

Nations and Nationalism may refer to:

- Nations and Nationalism (book), a 1983 book by Ernest Gellner
- Nations and Nationalism (journal), an academic journal established in 1995
