= Henrietta Moore =

British social anthropologist

Professor Dame Henrietta L. Moore
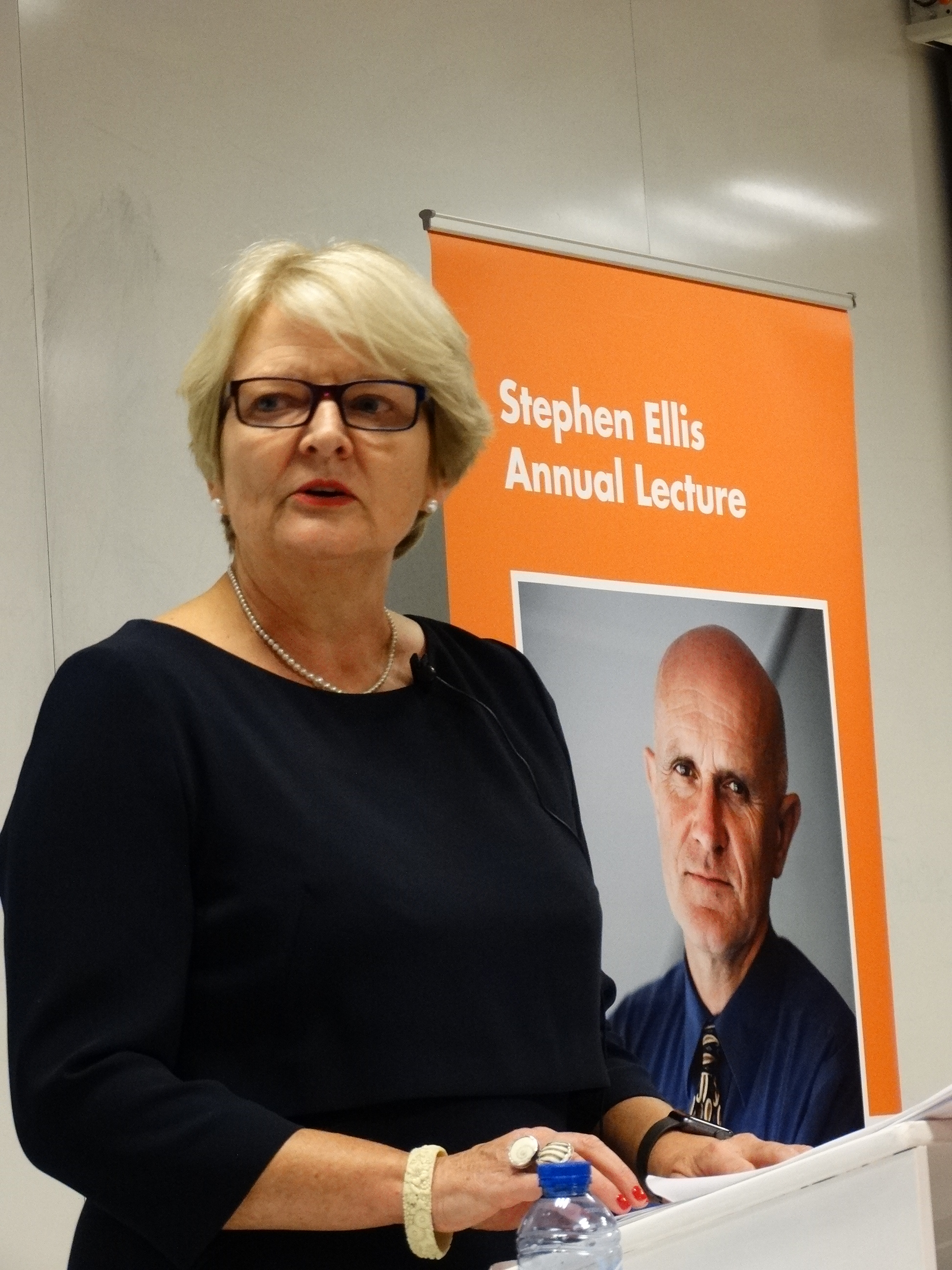
- Moore in 2018
- Born: Henrietta L. Moore; 18 May 1957 (age 69)
- Education: University of Cambridge
- Scientific career
- Workplaces: University College London
- Thesis: Men, women, and the organisation of domestic space among the Marakwet of Kenya (1983)

Professor Dame Henrietta L. Moore, DBE, FBA, FAcSS (born 18 May 1957) is a British social anthropologist and leading global thinker on prosperity. She is Founder and Director of the UCL Institute for Global Prosperity, part of the Bartlett, UCL's Faculty of the Built Environment, and holds Chair in Culture, Philosophy and Design at University College, London.

== Early life and education ==
Moore graduated from Durham University with an upper second in Archaeology and Anthropology in 1979. She continued her studies at Newnham College, Cambridge, completing a PhD in 1983.

== Career ==
After completing her university studies, Moore began her career working internationally, spending a year with the United Nations in Burkina Faso as a Field Director.

She subsequently returned to the UK to take up a role as Curatorial Assistant at the Museum of Archaeology and Anthropology, University of Cambridge. In 1985, Moore was appointed Lecturer in Social Anthropology at the University of Kent, marking the beginning of her academic career.

Moore later returned to Cambridge, where she held a lectureship in social anthropology. During this period, she served as Director of Studies in Anthropology at Girton College and, in 1989, was elected a Fellow of Pembroke College, where she continues to be affiliated as a Fellow.

Over the course of her career, Moore has held a number of senior academic and leadership positions. She served as the William Wyse Chair of Social Anthropology at the University of Cambridge, one of the discipline's most prestigious professorships. She later moved to London School of Economics, where she was Director of the Gender Institute from 1994 to 1999 and subsequently Deputy Director with responsibility for research and external relations. Across her career, she has also held visiting appointments at leading institutions in the United States, Germany, Portugal, Norway, and South Africa, reflecting the global reach of her work.

Moore's expertise has been widely recognised in policy and advisory contexts. She has served on the European Research Council and the European Scientific Council, as well as advising the UK government through the Scientific Advisory Council for the Department of Environment, Food and Rural Affairs. In 2019, she was appointed to the advisory panel for UK Treasury Dasgupta Review on Biodiversity, contributing to global debates on the relationship between economics and the natural environment.

Alongside her academic work, Moore has played a significant role in shaping organisations focused on social and economic transformation. She is Co-Founder and Chair of the SHM Group, a consultancy specialising in change management and social impact, and Chair and Founding Trustee of The SHM Foundation, which works internationally on youth empowerment and social innovation. She has also served on advisory boards for organisations including the Centre for the Understanding of Sustainable Prosperity (CUSP), European Citizen Science Association, and National Park City. Between 2018 and 2021, she served as President for the British Institute in Eastern Africa.

Moore has also been active in global policy engagement. In 2022, she co-chaired the Think7 (T7) Task Force, the official think tank engagement group of the G7, contributing to international policy discussions on economic transformation and sustainability. In 2023, she acted in an advisory role for the Southwark Land Commission's Land for Good report, which set out ambitious proposals for rethinking land use to better empower local communities. In 2024, also co-chaired the Sustainability and Social Value Working Group at the British Academy.

At University College London, where she is Founder and Director of the Institute for Global Prosperity, Moore has led a number of pioneering initiatives. In 2023, she established the UCL Citizen Science Academy, which provides practice-based education and training to enable citizens to participate in research, social action, and local decision-making – reflecting her commitment to inclusive and participatory approaches to knowledge production.

Her leadership extends across cultural and civic institutions. She has previously served as a Trustee of the Barbican Centre, and in 2025, was appointed Chair of the Board of Trustees at the Institute of Contemporary Arts.

Moore also chairs several influential cross-sector initiatives. She is Chair of the Global Board of Fast Forward 2030, a global network supporting impact entrepreneurs working towards the UN Sustainable Development Goals, and Chair of the London Prosperity Board, an innovative cross-sector partnership hosted by the UCL Institute for Global Prosperity that seeks to redefine and measure prosperity in London in more inclusive and sustainable ways.

== Honours and awards ==
Moore was appointed Dame Commander of the Order of the British Empire (DBE) in the 2016 New Year Honours for services to the social sciences, business, public policy and the arts.

She was elected a Fellow of the British Academy in 2007. In 2009, she was appointed a Professorial Fellow at Jesus College, Cambridge. She is also a Fellow of the Royal Society of Arts, a member of the Slovenian Academy of Sciences and Arts, and a Fellow of the Academy of Social Sciences. She has also been associated with the Clean Growth Leadership Network and is a member of the Institute of Directors.

Moore has received several honorary distinctions. In 2014, she was awarded an honorary degree by Queen's University Belfast, and in 2019 she was elected an Honorary Fellow of the University of Cambridge.

In 1995, Moore and Megan Vaughan were awarded the Herskovits Prize by the African Studies Association for their book Cutting Down Trees: Gender, Nutrition, and Agricultural Change in the Northern Province of Zambia, 1890-1990.

== Selected works and publications ==
=== Books ===
- Moore, Henrietta L. (1986). Space, text and gender: an anthropological study of the Marakwet of Kenya. Cambridge New York: Cambridge University Press. ISBN 9780521303330.
- Moore, Henrietta L. (1988). Feminism and anthropology. Minneapolis: University of Minnesota Press. ISBN 9780745601137.
- Moore, Henrietta L.; et al. (1994). The Polity reader in gender studies. Cambridge, UK Malden, Massachusetts: Polity Press. ISBN 9780745612102.
- Moore, Henrietta L.; Vaughan, Megan A. (1994). Cutting down trees: gender, nutrition and change in the Northern Province of Zambia, 1890–1990. New York: Heinemann and London: James Currey. ISBN 9780852556122. (Winner of the Herskovitz Prize)
- Moore, Henrietta L. (1994). A passion for difference: essays in anthropology and gender. Bloomington, Indiana: Indiana University Press. ISBN 9780253209511.
- Moore, Henrietta L. (1996). Space, text and gender: an anthropological study of Marakwet of Kenya (2nd ed.). Cambridge New York: Cambridge University Press. ISBN 9780521303330.
- Moore, Henrietta L. and Todd Sanders (2001). Magical interpretations, material realities: modernity, witchcraft, and the occult in postcolonial Africa. London New York: Routledge. ISBN 9780415241557.
- Moore, Henrietta L.; Mayo, Ed (2001). Building the mutual state: findings from the virtual think tank www[dot]themutualstate[dot]org. London: New Economics Foundation and Mutuo. ISBN 9781899407491.
- Moore, Henrietta L. (2007). The subject of anthropology: gender, symbolism and psychoanalysis. Cambridge, UK Malden, Massachusetts: Polity Press. ISBN 9780745608099.
- Moore, Henrietta L.; Held, David (2008). Cultural politics in a global age: uncertainty, solidarity, and innovation. Oxford: One World Publications. ISBN 9781851685509.
- Moore, Henrietta L.; Sanders, Todd (2014) [2006]. Anthropology in theory: issues in epistemology (2nd ed.). Malden, Massachusetts: Wiley-Blackwell. ISBN 9780470673355.
- Moore, Henrietta L.; Davies, Matthew; Mintchev, Nikolay; Woodcraft, Saffron (2023) [2023]. Prosperity in the Twenty-First Century: Concepts, Models and Metrics (Global Prosperity in Thought and Practice) (1st ed.). UCL Press (published 22 June 2023). ISBN 1800084463.
- Moore, Henrietta L.; Kay, Arthur (2025) [2025]. Roadkill: Unveiling the True Cost of Our Toxic Relationship with Cars. John Wiley & Sons Inc. ISBN 9781394295999.

=== Journal articles ===
- Nyokabi, Ndungu S., Moore, Henrietta L., Berg, Stefan, et al. (2023). ‘Implementing a One Health approach to strengthen the management of zoonoses in Ethiopia’, One Health, 16, https://doi.org/10.1016/j.onehlt.2023.100521
- Baumann, Hanna., and Moore, Henrietta L. (2023). ‘Thinking vulnerability infrastructurally: Interdependence and possibility in Lebanon’s overlapping crises’, Environment and Planning C: Politics and Space, 41(6), 1225-1242. https://doi.org/10.1177/23996544231174399
- Lavell, Allan., McFarlane, Colin., Moore, Henrietta L., et al. (2023). ‘Pathways to urban equality through the Sustainable Development Goals: Modes of extreme poverty, resilience, and prosperity’, International Journal of Urban Sustainable Development, 15(1), 215-229. https://doi.org/10.1080/19463138.2023.2226099
- Davies, M. I. J., Moore, H. L., Bailengo, N., et al. (2023). ‘Unintended consequences, conflict, and resilience in a small-scale irrigation development, Marakwet, Kenya’, Africa, 94(2), 251-275. https://doi.org/10.1017/S0001972024000238
- Baumann, Hanna., and Moore, Henrietta L. (2025). ‘Towards a relational understanding of vulnerability: The response to the Syrian refugee crisis in Lebanon through a feminist lens’, Progress in Development Studies, 25(10), 26-44. https://doi.org/10.1177/14649934241303301
- Ndungu, Nyokabi., Muunda, Emmanuel., Moore, Henrietta L., et al. (2026). ‘Adoption of food safety measures in smallholder dairy farms in Kenya: Implications for milk safety and public health’, One Health, 22, https://doi.org/10.1016/j.onehlt.2026.101342

=== Media articles and opinion pieces ===
- Moore, Henrietta L. (2015). ‘Antibiotic resistance shows how our growth-at-any-cost model is destroying itself’, The Independent, 20 November, https://www.independent.co.uk/voices/antibiotic-resistance-shows-how-our-growthatanycost-model-is-destroying-itself-a6742461.html
- Moore, Henrietta L. (2016). ‘Can agroecology feed the world and save the planet?’, The Guardian, 9 October, https://www.theguardian.com/global-development-professionals-network/2016/oct/09/agroecological-farming-feed-world-africa
- Moore, Henrietta L. (2017). ‘For the future of work to look bright, we need to beat our addiction to growth’, OpenDemocracy, 25 April, https://www.opendemocracy.net/en/for-future-of-work-to-look-bright-we-need-to-beat-our-addiction-to-growth/
- Moore, Henrietta L. (2018). ‘Our welfare system needs a radical overhaul. It’s time for Universal Basic Services’, Huffington Post, 11 October, https://www.huffingtonpost.co.uk/henrietta-moore/welfare-system-overhaul_b_18222568.html
- Moore, Henrietta L. (2018). ‘Brexit is making us blind to the real job crisis’, Huffington Post, 12 July, https://www.huffingtonpost.co.uk/entry/brexit-is-making-us-blind-to-the-real-jobs-crisis_uk_5b4757bbe4b02221e2ee7a3e
- Moore, Henrietta L. (2018). ‘In the face of climate change, ranking states by prosperity invites disaster’, The Guardian, 5 December, https://www.theguardian.com/global-development/2018/dec/05/climate-change-ranking-prosperity-invites-disaster-henrietta-moore-ucl
- Moore, Henrietta L. (2019). ‘Engineering a sensible smart city’, The Engineer, 20 September, https://www.theengineer.co.uk/content/opinion/engineering-a-sensible-smart-city
- Moore, Henrietta L. (2021). ‘To truly ‘build back better’ we must reimagine what prosperity looks like’, Financial Times, 6 September, https://www.ft.com/content/fb900edd-9849-4bc1-a9e8-a4a4cf459677
- Moore, Henrietta L. (2021). ‘Beyond GDP: here’s a better way to measure people’s prosperity’, The Conversation, 13 October, https://theconversation.com/beyond-gdp-heres-a-better-way-to-measure-peoples-prosperity-168023
- Moore, Henrietta L. (2022). ‘Why successive Conservative attempts to level up have failed’, Prospect Magazine, 2 March, https://www.prospectmagazine.co.uk/politics/38454/why-successive-conservative-attempts-to-level-up-have-failed
- Moore, Henrietta L. (2022). ‘Local government should be free of political parties’, Local Government Chronicle, 6 June, https://www.lgcplus.com/politics/governance-and-structure/henrietta-moore-local-government-should-be-free-of-political-parties-06-06-2022/
- Moore, Henrietta L., and Kay, Arthur (2025). 'Vehicles are the next frontier in cybercrime', Wired, 58, 19 December, https://wired.jp/article/vol58-vehicles-are-the-next-frontier-in-cybercrime/
- Moore, Henrietta L., and Kay, Arthur (2026). ‘To make America affordable, start with cars, Barrons, 16 September, https://www.barrons.com/articles/to-make-america-affordable-start-with-cars-0cf929e2?st=BUGtVD
- Moore, Henrietta L., and Kay, Arthur (2026). ‘Why we built cities for cars, not people, and how we can fix that’, Fast Company, 16 September, https://www.fastcompany.com/91385004/why-we-built-cities-for-cars-not-people-and-how-to-fix-that-cities-cars-people
- Moore, Henrietta L., and Kay, Arthur (2026). ‘From freedom to constraint: How cars boxed in American life’, Fortune, 16 September, https://fortune.com/2025/09/16/from-freedom-to-constraint-how-cars-boxed-in-american-life/
- Moore, Henrietta L. (2026). ‘Cultural evolution and a new economy for the 21st century’, ProSocial World, 24 March, https://www.prosocial.world/posts/cultural-evolution-and-a-new-economy-for-the-21st-century

Academic offices
Preceded by Marilyn Strathern	William Wyse Professor of Social Anthropology; Cambridge University; 2008 – 2014	Succeeded by James Laidlaw
