= Tongnaab =

Tongnaab (literally "Chief of the Earth") is a deity associated with the Tallensi people of northern Ghana. Tongnaab is particularly believed to have powers in fertility, stability and security.

The Tongnaab cult developed from a small regional belief in the Tong Hills region before the colonial period, and gained substantial popularity as a witch-hunting deity during the colonial era. It gained followers across the Gold Coast.

== See also ==
- Meyer Fortes - a South African anthropologist who made an extensive study of Tallensi religion
