= Gbeogo =

- Location in Ghana
- Coordinates: 11°1′N 0°11′W
- Country: Ghana
- Region: Upper East Region

Gbeogo is a village in northern Ghana. It is situated to the south-east of Bolgatanga, in the Tallensi Traditional Area. Gbeogo is populated by the Tallensi people, and consists mainly of mud-built dwellings. The village is home to a deaf school and has been host to American Peace Corps Volunteers for decades. They run the tree nursery, teach in the deaf school and work in the dispensary.
