= Meyer Fortes =

South African-born anthropologist (1906–1983)

- Born: 25 April 1906; Britstown, Cape Colony
- Died: 27 January 1983 (aged 76); Cambridge, England
- Known for: Tallensi and Ashanti
- Scientific career
- Fields: anthropology
- Academic advisors: Bronisław Malinowski

Meyer Fortes FBA FRAI (25 April 1906 – 27 January 1983) was a South African-born anthropologist, best known for his work among the Tallensi and Ashanti in Ghana.

Originally trained in psychology, Fortes employed the notion of the "person" into his structural-functional analyses of kinship, the family, and ancestor worship setting a standard for studies on African social organization. His celebrated book, Oedipus and Job in West African Religion (1959), fused his two interests and set a standard for comparative ethnology. He also wrote extensively on issues of the first born, kingship, and divination.

== Life ==
Fortes received his anthropological training from Charles Gabriel Seligman at the London School of Economics. Fortes also trained with Bronisław Malinowski and Raymond Firth. Along with contemporaries A. R. Radcliffe-Brown, Sir Edmund Leach, Audrey Richards, and Lucy Mair, Fortes held strong functionalist views that insisted upon empirical evidence in order to generate analyses of society. His volume with E. E. Evans-Pritchard, African Political Systems (1940) established the principles of segmentation and balanced opposition, which were to become the hallmarks of African political anthropology. Despite his work in Francophone West Africa, Fortes' work on political systems was influential to other British anthropologists, especially Max Gluckman and played a role in shaping what became known as the Manchester school of social anthropology, which emphasized the problems of working in colonial Central Africa.

Fortes spent much of his career as a reader at the University of Cambridge and was the William Wyse Professor of Social Anthropology there from 1950 to 1973.

In 1963, Fortes delivered the inaugural Lewis Henry Morgan Lecture at the University of Rochester, considered by many to be the most important annual lecture series in the field of Anthropology.

Fortes was elected to the American Academy of Arts and Sciences in 1964, was President of the Royal Anthropological Institute of Great Britain and Ireland from 1965 to 1967 and recipient of the institute's highest honour, the Huxley Memorial Medal in 1977. He was also an elected member of the American Philosophical Society.

Fortes was first cousin of US lawyer and Supreme Court Justice, Abe Fortas. Meyer Fortes' granddaughter, Alison Marshall, has written about his life in her book Journeys of Hope: The Letters of Meyer and Sonia.

== Holodomor testimony ==
Meyer Fortes corresponded with his close friend Jerry Berman, who in the early 1930s worked in the USSR as a civil engineer and documented the famine in his private letters. In 2021, the granddaughter of Fortes donated these letters to the National Museum of the Holodomor-Genocide in Kyiv.

== Selected bibliography ==
- 1940. African Political Systems (editor, with E. E. Evans-Pritchard). London and New York: International African Institute.
- 1945. The Dynamics of Clanship among the Tallensi.
- 1949. The Web of Kinship among the Tallensi.
- 1959. Oedipus and Job in West African Religion.
- 1969. Kinship and the Social Order.
- 1970. Time and Social Structure.
- 1970. Social Structure (editor).
- 1983. Rules and the Emergence of Society.

Academic offices
Preceded by John Henry Hutton	William Wyse Professor of Social Anthropology Cambridge University; 1950 - 1973	Succeeded by Jack Goody
