= Park Mains High School =

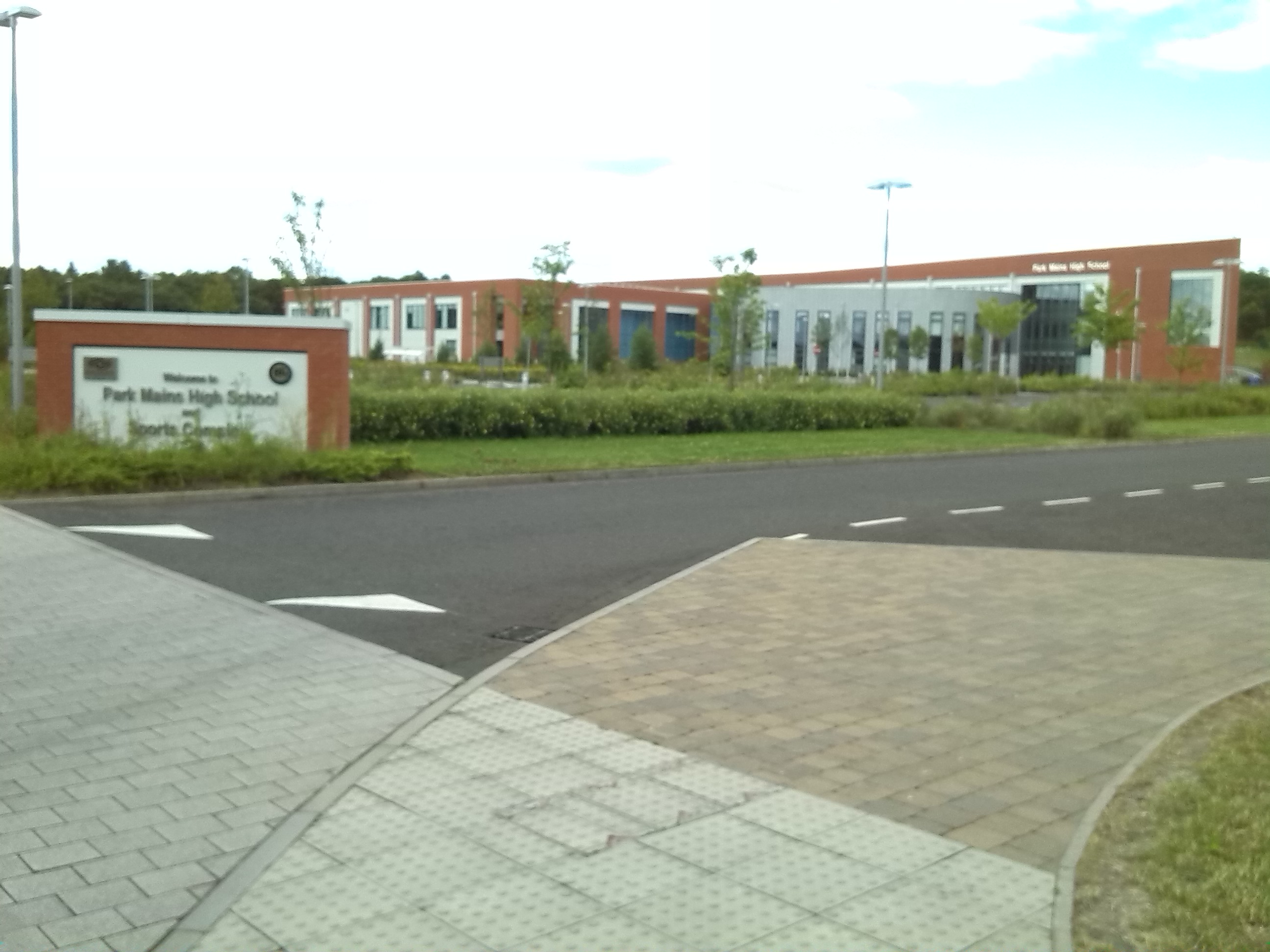
- School building

Location
- Barrhill Road; Erskine, Renfrewshire; Scotland; 55°54′09″N 4°27′32″W

Information
- Type: Public School
- Established: 1974
- School district: Renfrewshire Council
- Head teacher: Alan Dick
- Enrollment: 1,500+
- Colors: Blue and black
- Website: https://www.parkmainshigh.renfrewshire.sch.uk/

Park Mains High School is a secondary school in Erskine, Renfrewshire. It is one of the biggest schools in Scotland. As well as taking in students from the town it also enrolls them from the surrounding areas of Bishopton (including the new Dargavel Village), Inchinnan, and Langbank.

== New school building (2012–present) ==
Renfrewshire Council granted a new multimillion-pound rebuild of the school. The new building was opened in August 2012 at a cost of £31M. It was designed and planned by Holmes Miller. Construction was completed by Bam Construction. FES Ltd were the contractors for the electrical, mechanical, IT installations and fire and security systems. The building offers a larger, brighter space for the pupils to feel in a social hub whilst still being in a controlled learning environment. One key feature of the school is the central "street area" with natural sunlight. The school's new sports complex has a multi-use games hall and gymnasium. The site of the old school building is now a £400,000 multi-use 3G sports pitch with running track. There are also hockey pitches and a rugby field. The school building has regularly featured in architectural publications. It has received award nominations for its design and construction.

== Guidance ==
Pupils are assigned to a guidance group in their first year at Park Mains. The guidance groups are named after some of the Scottish Isles. These are Skye, Arran, Bute and Mull. Pupils remain in these groups until their departure from the school.

== Notable former pupils ==
- Chris Aitken, former footballer, now assistant manager at East Kilbride FC
- Stephen Aitken, former footballer, now manager at East Kilbride Thistle
- Wendy Alexander, former leader of the Scottish Labour Party
- Douglas Alexander, former Labour Shadow Foreign Secretary
- James Laidlaw, William Wyse Professor of Social Anthropology at the University of Cambridge since 2016.
- Keith Lasley, former footballer, now assistant manager at Motherwell FC
- Peter Leven, former footballer, assistant manager at Kilmarnock FC
- Derek Lilley, former footballer
- Kirsty Mitchell, actress and former Miss Scotland
- Brian O'Neil, former footballer
- Blair Spittal, footballer at Motherwell
- Dougie Vipond, TV presenter & Deacon Blue drummer
- Evan Mooney, footballer at St Mirren (born 2007)

== Notable former teachers ==
- Michael Shanks, politician
