= Thought and Change =

1964 book by the philosopher Ernest Gellner

- Author: Ernest Gellner
- Genre: Philosophy
- Publisher: Weidenfeld and Nicolson
- Publication date: 1964
- ISBN: 9780297169970

Thought and Change is a 1964 book by the philosopher Ernest Gellner, in which the author outlines his views on "modernity" and looks at the processes of social change and historical transformation and, perhaps most forcefully, the power of nationalism. Maleŝević and Haugaard argue that the method is the socio-historical method, and Gellner sets out a powerful sociology of specific philosophical doctrines and ideologies, from utilitarianism and Kantianism to nationalism. The chapter specifically dealing with nationalism was later expanded to form the basis of Gellner's most famous book, Nations and Nationalism (1983).

They also note that rather than looking at the internal coherence of philosophies, Gellner places them in their historical context. He thus explains their origins and their likely influence. Modernity is considered to be "unique, unprecedented and exceptional", with characteristics sustained by growth of economies and increases in cultural uniformity.

The chapters of the book include: Time and Validity; The New Social Contract; Metamorphosis; The Uses of Thought; The Uses of Doubt; The Stuff of Change; Nationalism; Knowledge and Society and a Conclusion.

In Chapter 1 on Time and Validity Gellner critiques nineteenth-century theories of progress and historical destiny. He argues that historical change is real, but history itself cannot automatically confer moral or intellectual validity.

In Chapter 2 The New Social Contract he examines modern attempts to justify political order after the decline of traditional authority. Gellner analyses contract theories and asks how freedom, legitimacy and social cohesion can coexist in modern societies. In Chapter 3 Metamorphosis he investigates the transition from agrarian to industrial society and argues that modernity is a qualitative transformation rather than gradual development. The chapter focuses on the problems and consequences of living through periods of major social change.

In Chapter 4 on The Uses of Thought he examines the social functions of ideas, ethical systems and political theories. Instead of asking whether doctrines are true, Gellner asks what purposes they serve within society and government.

In Chapter 5 on The Uses of Doubt he defends scepticism, criticism and intellectual pluralism as foundations of modern civilisation. Gellner argues that successful societies institutionalise doubt rather than relying on unquestioned certainty.

In Chapter 6 on The Stuff of Change he discusses the mechanisms of large-scale historical transformation. Gellner develops a theory of modernity centred on the transition from agrarian to industrial society and evaluates competing explanations of social development.

In Chapter 7 on Nationalism, and this is probably the book's most famous chapter, later expanded into Nations and Nationalism, he argues that nationalism is a product of industrial society and that, in modernity, nationalism creates nations rather than merely expressing them. (see also Gellner's theory of nationalism.)

In Chapter 8 on Knowledge and Society he investigates the relationships between culture, truth and knowledge. Gellner rejects relativism while insisting that ideas are socially situated, arguing that objective knowledge remains possible within critical scientific inquiry.

In Chapter 9 his Conclusion he argues that modern industrial society is an unprecedented social transformation, sustained by continuing economic and intellectual growth but accompanied by instability, cultural standardisation and nationalism. It must therefore abandon comforting doctrines of inevitable progress while preserving critical reason and objective knowledge as the best means of understanding and coping with continuous change.

== Editions ==
- (1965) Thought and Change, London: Weidenfeld and Nicolson; Chicago: University of Chicago Press (with the imprint 1964). pp. viii + 224.
