= Technology, Tradition, and the State in Africa =

1971 book by Jack Goody

Technology, Tradition and the State in Africa
- The first edition cover of the book.
- Author: Jack Goody
- Language: English
- Subject: History of Africa; Sociology; Anthropology
- Publisher: Oxford University Press
- Publication date: 1971
- Publication place: United Kingdom
- Media type: Print (Hardcover & Paperback)
- Pages: 88

Technology, Tradition and the State in Africa is a book studying the indigenous political systems of sub-Saharan Africa written by the British social anthropologist Jack Goody (1919–2015), then a professor at St. John's College, Cambridge University. It was first published in 1971 by Oxford University Press for the International African Institute.

Divided into five chapters, the short book is devoted to Goody's argument that former scholars studying sub-Saharan Africa had made mistakes by comparing its historical development to that in Europe, believing the two to be fundamentally different due to technological differences between the two continents. In particular he criticises the idea that African political systems were ever feudal, believing that such a concept – while applicable to medieval Europe – was not applicable to pre-colonial Africa.

== Synopsis ==
=== Chapter One: Feudalism in Africa? ===
In the first chapter, entitled "Feudalism in Africa?", Goody explores the various definitions of the word "feudalism", and the manner in which it has been used to describe historical societies across both Europe and Asia, and also the manner in which social anthropologists have used it to refer to contemporary societies in Africa. He proceeds to discuss the various definitions of feudalism, and the way in which it has been used by both noted sociologists such as Max Weber and Karl Marx and also by historians like Marc Bloch. Goody then goes into greater detail regarding how the term has been used to refer to various African states, such as S.F. Nadel's use of the term to refer to Nupe society in his book A Black Byzantium (1942), and Maquet's use of the term to refer to the states of the Ruanda in his work The Premise of Inequality in Ruanda (1961), believing that the use of the term "feudal" – which has its basis in historical investigation into medieval Europe – is simply unnecessary in both of these cases.

"If we are to take up and develop the tradition of comparative work, which has been so neglected in recent years by historians, sociologists and anthropologists alike, then the best strategy at this stage is to avoid the kind of overall comparisons that are invited by words like tribalism, feudalism, capitalism. These abstractions make for too crude a level of analysis."

— Jack Goody, 1971.

Moving on to look at the "economic approach to feudalism", Goody challenges the view championed by "orthodox Marxists" such as I.I. Potemkin that in Africa, feudal states emerged because land was controlled by powerful land owners to whom the peasants were indebted, having to pay rent or proving services in return for being allowed to farm the land. Instead, Goody argues, in much of Africa, land was plentiful and "of little economic importance", and that such a feudal system of land ownership was simply not applicable. Goody proceeds to argue that while Africanists should not adopt the term "feudalism" from historians of medieval Europe, there should be greater interdisciplinary work on Africa from historians, anthropologists and sociologists alike.

=== Chapter Two: Polity and the Means of Production ===
Goody devotes the second chapter to an examination of the economic and technological aspects of pre-colonial African society, which he argues distinguish it from medieval Europe specifically and Eurasia more generally. He begins with a brief discussion of the complex trade networks across Sub-Saharan Africa that existed prior to contact with Europeans, noting that it certain respects Africa had a monetary economy that was similar to that of Western Europe. However, according to Goody it was in its "means of production" rather than its "productive relations" that Africa's economy differed greatly from that of Eurasia; describing the continent as a "land of extensive agriculture", Goody noted that it had a relatively small population, plentiful land, and poor soils, and that notably the majority of Africa did not have access to the plough, an invention that only reached as far south as Ethiopia.

Goody goes on to look at the nature of land in Africa, arguing that it was both more plentiful and less productive than that in Europe, leading Africans to move their farms around more often. He argues that the nature of land in Africa meant that the concept of serfdom, a prominent part of medieval European society, never developed there. He rounds up the chapter with a discussion of the role that horses and cavalry played in the African military.

== Main Arguments ==
=== "Feudalism" in Africa ===
"It is≈≥±−÷§ the thesis of this present work that the nature of 'indigenous' African social structure, especially in its political aspects, has been partly misunderstood because of a failure to appreciate certain basic technological differences between Africa and Eurasia. It is the differences that make the application of the European concept of 'feudalism' inappropriate. But the problem is not only historical; in many areas 'traditional' African social structure exists (in a somewhat modified form) precisely because the rural economy has not greatly changed. It is not only the comparative analysis of historians and sociologists that needs to take cognizance of these facts, but also the decisions of planners, developers, and politicians (both reforming and conserving)."

— Jack Goody, in the book's preface, 1971.

In Technology, Tradition and the State in Africa, Goody presents his argument that the label "feudal" is not applicable when referring to African states, considering it to be a word that is primarily used to describe the societies of medieval Europe. Although Goody accepted the possible existence of "broad resemblances between the states of medieval Europe and those of pre-colonial Africa", in particular similarities between their "monarchical systems of government", he dismisses the use of such a "vague and all-embracing concept" as feudalism, believing that it ignores the multiple differences – primarily regarding "economics and technology" – which differentiate the two continents.

Goody criticised those Africanists, such as S.F. Nadel and J.J. Maquet, who have used such a term to describe societies which they are studying, but praised M.G. Smith, L.A. Fallers and L.P. Mair, who "make at least as adequate an analysis [in their own studies] without introducing the concept at all." According to Goody, "This second approach seems preferable as a procedure. It is simpler; it minimizes the inevitable Western bias; and it helps to avoid the assumption that because we find vassalage (for example), we necessarily find the other institutions associated with it in medieval Europe."

He notes the trend for orthodox Marxist scholars in particular to claim that certain African states were feudal, arguing that because of their adherence to Marxism, they are "apt to fall back upon the idea of universal progression from tribalism to slavery, feudalism, capitalism, and finally socialism, each stage being characterized by a particular set of social institutions." Although he notes that the theories of Karl Marx and Friedrich Engels – the founders of Marxist thought – gave much to the study of how society's progress, Goody believed that this orthodox Marxist approach when dealing with African history "blocks advance" because it held to a "rigid attachment to particular European-based schema, whether this be derived from an explicit ideological commitment or from an inability to see beyond our own cultural tradition."

Although he rejected the term "feudalism", which he considered to be rooted to the study of medieval Europe, Goody did however believe that "Africanists certainly have something to learn from the studies of medieval historians", noting that "valuable material for comparative analysis" can be found on such topics as "inheritance, marriage, [and] descent". by msela
