= Georges Davy =

French sociologist

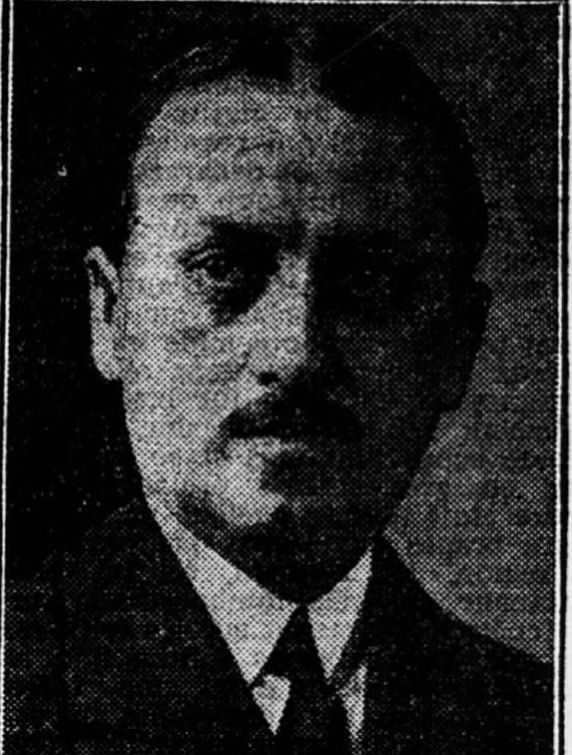
Georges Davy

Georges Davy (French: [davi]; 31 December 1883, Bernay – 27 July 1976, Coutances) was a French sociologist.

He was a student and disciple of Émile Durkheim. With Marcel Mauss and Paul Huvelin, he pioneered anthropological studies of the origins of the idea of contract.

== Works ==
- (ed.) Émile Durkheim: choix de textes avec étude du système sociologique by Émile Durkheim. 1911.
- Le droit, l'idéalisme et l'expérience, 1922
- La foi jurée: étude sociologique du problème du contrat: la formation du lien contractuel, 1922
- (with Alexandre Moret) Des clans aux empires; l'organisation sociale chez les primitifs et dans l'Orient ancien, 1923
- Éléments de sociologie, 1929.
- Sociologues d'hier et d'aujourd'hui, 1931
- (ed.) Leçons de sociologie by Émile Durkheim. 1950.
- Thomas Hobbes et J.J. Rousseau, 1953.
- L'homme; le fait social et le fait politique, 1973
