= African Political Systems =

Anthology edited by Meyer Fortes and E. E. Evans-Pritchard

- Title page for African Political Systems (1940)
- Author: Meyer Fortes and E. E. Evans-Pritchard (editors)
- Language: English
- Subject: Anthropology, Sociology
- Publisher: Oxford University Press
- Publication date: 1940
- Publication place: United Kingdom
- Media type: Print (Hardcover)
- Pages: 302

African Political Systems is an academic anthology edited by the anthropologists Meyer Fortes and E. E. Evans-Pritchard which was published by Oxford University Press on the behalf of the International African Institute in 1940. The book contains eight separate papers produced by scholars working in the field of anthropology, each of which focuses in on a different society in Sub-Saharan Africa. It was the intention of the editors to bring together information on African political systems on a "broad, comparative basis" for the first time.

== Background ==
Describing the purpose of African Political Systems, Fortes and Evans-Pritchard related that it offered "both an experiment in collaborative research and an attempt to bring into focus one of the major problems of African sociology. Many dogmatic opinions are held on the subject of African political organization and are even made use of in administrative practice; but no one has yet examined this aspect of African society on a broad, comparative basis." They expressed their hope that the anthology would prove to be "the first stage of a wider enquiry into the nature and development of African political systems", which would ultimately include not only "native political systems" but also "the study of the development of these systems under the influence of European rule."

== Synopsis ==
=== Radcliffe-Brown's "Preface" ===
The preface to African Political Systems was authored by A.R. Radcliffe-Brown (1881–1955), then Professor of Social Anthropology at the University of Oxford, who argued that the "comparative study of political institutions, with special reference to the simpler societies, is an important branch of social anthropology which has not yet received the attention it deserves." Proceeding to argue that the "comparative method" can be used "as an instrument for inductive inference", he believed that doing so would allow scholars to "discover the universal, essential, characters which belong to all human societies, past, present and future". Despite this, he did note that scholars must be careful not to "pass directly from empirical observations to a knowledge of general sociological laws or principles", believing that before this, all known societies must be "reduced to some order of classification".
