= James Laidlaw (anthropologist) =

British anthropologist

James Alexander Laidlaw (born 12 September 1963) is a British social anthropologist and academic. From 2016 to 2024, he was William Wyse Professor of Social Anthropology at the University of Cambridge.

== Education and career ==
Laidlaw was born in Renfrewshire on 12 September 1963. He was educated at Park Mains High School in Erskine (at the same time as the future Labour Party politician Wendy Alexander), before going on to attend King's College, Cambridge, as an undergraduate, where he studied social anthropology. He remained at Cambridge for his graduate study, receiving a Ph.D. in 1990. While pursuing his doctoral degree, Laidlaw was appointed a junior research fellow at King's. He was promoted to senior research fellow in 1993, eventually advancing to become a fellow of the college.

In 2016, Laidlaw was appointed William Wyse Professor of Social Anthropology, and until October 2021 he was head of the Cambridge Department of Social Anthropology. He was succeeded as William Wyse Professor of Social Anthropology by Rebecca Cassidy in 2025, and now holds the titled of Emeritus Professor of Social Anthropology.

== Work ==
His areas of ethnographic research include Asian religions, especially Jainism in India, about which he published a monograph in 1995, and Buddhism in Taiwan. He has also been among the early proponents of the influential turn to studying ethics in sociocultural anthropology, through his 2001 Malinowski Memorial Lecture, and his 2013 "path-breaking book-length construction of the field", The Subject of Virtue, which Webb Keane has described as "a major work that I expect will be a cornerstone of our teaching for a generation." Finally, together with Caroline Humphrey, Laidlaw has developed an influential theory of ritual.
