= Alexandre Moret =

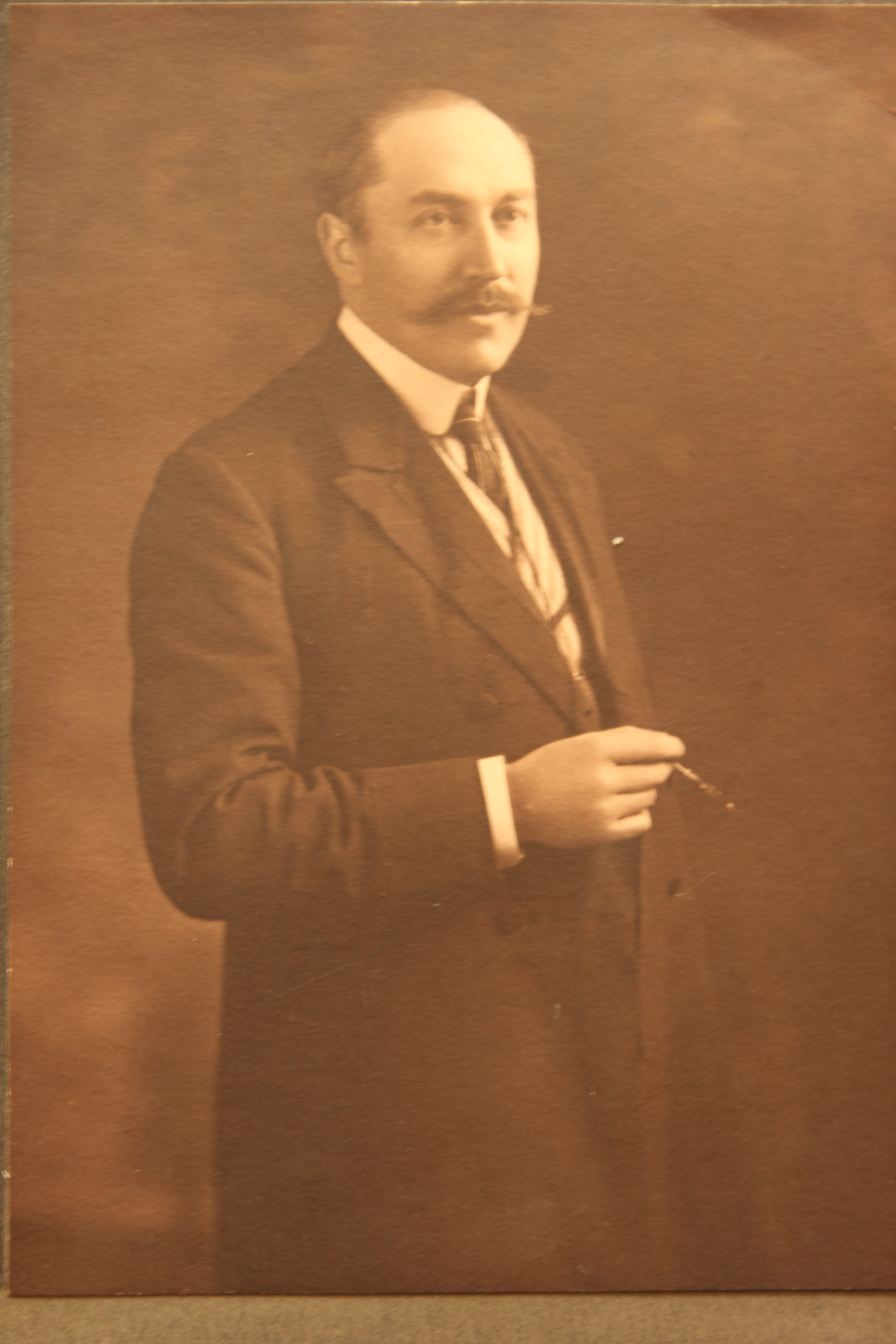
Alexandre Moret (1868-1938).

Alexandre Moret (French: [mɔʁɛ]; 19 September 1868, Aix-les-Bains – 2 February 1938, Paris) was a French Egyptologist.

== Life ==
From 1906 to 1923 Moret was curator of the Musée Guimet. In 1918 Moret succeeded Émile Amélineau as Director of Studies for the Religions of Egypt within the Fifth Section of the École pratique des hautes études, devoted to religious science.

In 1923 he became Professor of Egyptology at the College de France, and in 1927 a member of the French Academy. In 1926 he delivered the Frazer Lecture at Oxford University, taking the killing of god in Egypt as his theme.

Moret developed an interest in Durkheimian sociology, co-authoring a book on ancient society with Georges Davy.

== Works ==
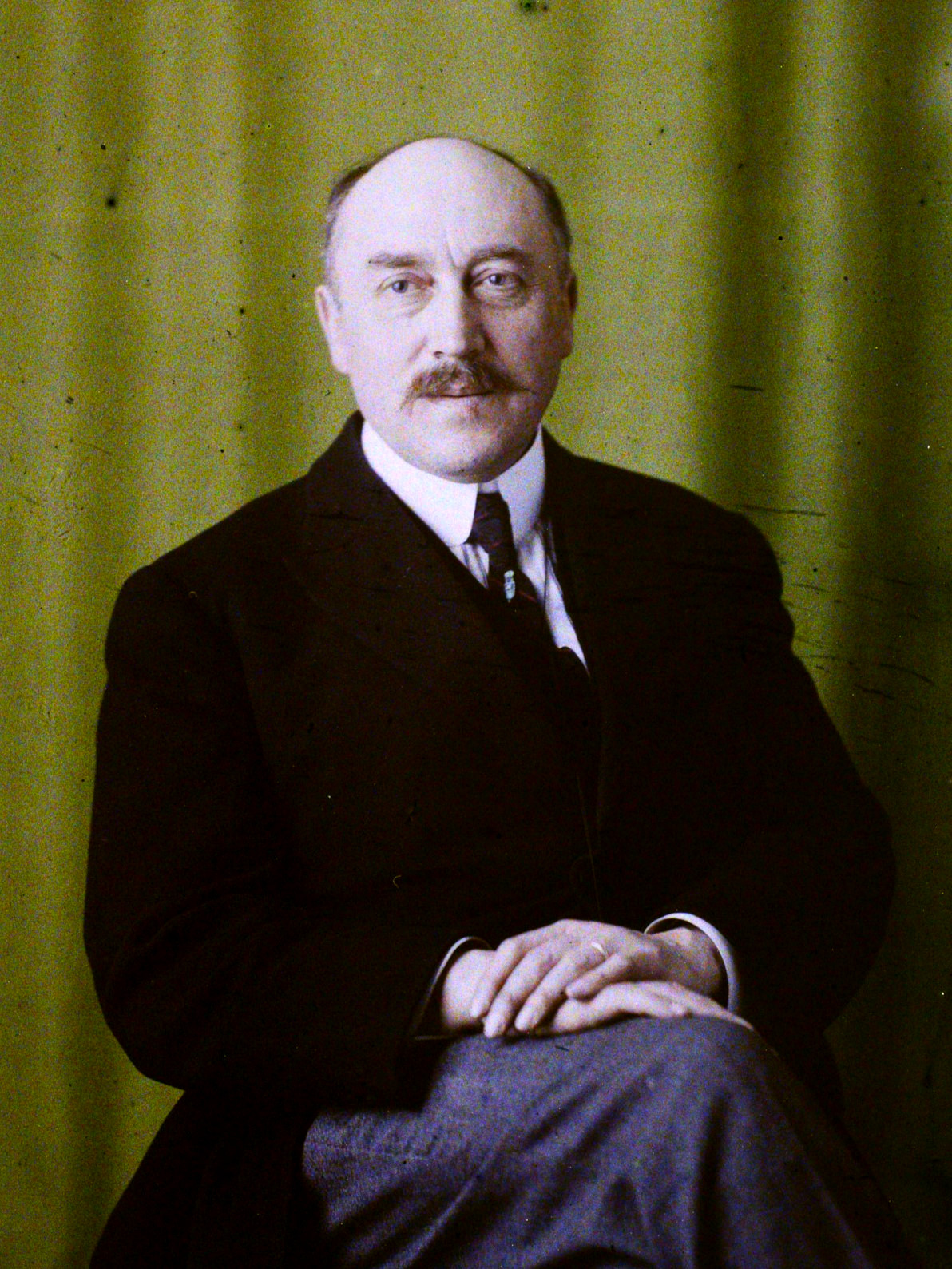
Autochrome portrait by Auguste Léon, 1921

- Du caractère religieux de la royauté pharaonique, 1902.
- Le rituel du culte divin journalier en Égypte, d'après les papyrus de Berlin et les textes du temple de Séti 1er, à Abydos , 1902.
- Études sur le calendrier égyptien, 1907.
- Au temps des Pharaons, 1908. Translated by Madame Moret as In the time of the Pharaohs, 1911.
- Chronologie égyptienne, 1912.
- Rois et dieux d'Égypte, 1911. Translated by Madame Moret as Kings and Gods of Egypt, 1912.
- Mystères égyptiens, 1913.
- Sarcophages de l'époque bubastite à l'époque saïte, 1913
- (with Georges Davy) Des clans aux empires; l'organisation sociale chez les primitifs et dans l'Orient ancien. Translated by V. Gordon Childe as From Tribe to Empire: social organization among primitives and in the Ancient East, 1926
- Le Nil et la civilisation égyptienne, 1926. Translated by M. R. Dobie as The Nile and Egyptian civilization, 1927.
- Histoire de l'Orient, 1936.

Preceded by Gaston Maspero	Chair of Egyptology at the Collège de France; 1923–1938	Position abolished
