= Thomas Callan Hodson =

British anthropologist

- Born: December, 1871; Hornsey, Middlesex, Great Britain
- Died: 26 January 1953; Tisbury, Wiltshire

Academic background
- Education: Queen's College, Oxford

Thomas Callan Hodson (1871–1953) was the first William Wyse Professor of Social Anthropology at the University of Cambridge, where he was a Fellow of St Catharine's College, notable for his writings on Indian anthropology and for coining the term sociolinguistics.

== Early life ==
Thomas was born to Arthur Hudson and Mary Catherine Hudson nee Callan in December 1871. He was the eldest of six children. Thomas went to school at Christ's Hospital. He joined the Queen's College, Oxford in 1890 on an Eglesfield scholarship.

He qualified for the Indian Civil Service in 1893 and left for India the following year. He was deputed to Assam and started service in the Khasi and Jaintia Hills. On one of his first assignments, he served as the personal assistant to Henry Cotton, then the Chief Commissioner of Assam.

== 1931 Census of India ==
In Analysis of the 1931 Census of India (Government of India Press, 1937) Hodson analysed the physical types in India, in great detail, adopting the models dominant in his day. This analysis was independent of the castes, and Brahmins and Dalits were classified in the same "racial groups". For example, Telugu Brahmins and Chamars were classified as "Racial Element A". In total, he distinguished seven "racial elements", from A to G.

Hodson used the classical "brachycephalic" and "dolichocephalic" terminology in force in racial discourses of the day. This was a typology constructed from the so-called "cephalic index" (the ratio of the maximum width of the head to its maximum length) and to classify human populations according to this purported scientific measure. Invented by the anatomist Anders Retzius (1796–1860), the cephalic index classification was disputed by Franz Boas's anthropological works, and Boas's criticisms are widely accepted today. Hodson also typically associates racial categories with supposed stages of economic and linguistic development, implying a hierarchy of racially defined cultures, a view characteristic of scientific racism.

Hodson believed that the earliest occupants of India were probably of the "Negrito race", followed by the "proto-Australoids". Later, an early stock probably of the Mediterranean race, came to India and mingled with the proto-Australoids. He believed that these people spoke an agglutinative language from which the present Austroasiatic languages are derived. They had a rudimentary knowledge of agriculture, building stone monuments, and primitive navigation. This migration was followed by an immigration of more civilised Mediterraneans from the Persian Gulf (ultimately from eastern Europe). These people had the knowledge of the metals, but not of iron. They were followed by later waves of immigrants who developed the Indus Valley Civilization. All these immigrants were of the dolichocephalic type, but the Indus valley people had a mixed brachycephalic element coming from the Anatolian plateau, in the form of the Armenoid branch of the Alpine race. These people probably spoke the Dravidian languages. Later, a brachycephalic race speaking perhaps an Indo-European language of the "Pisacha or Dardic family", migrated to India from the Iranian plateau and the Pamirs. During about 1500 B.C., the Indo-Aryans migrated into Northern India.

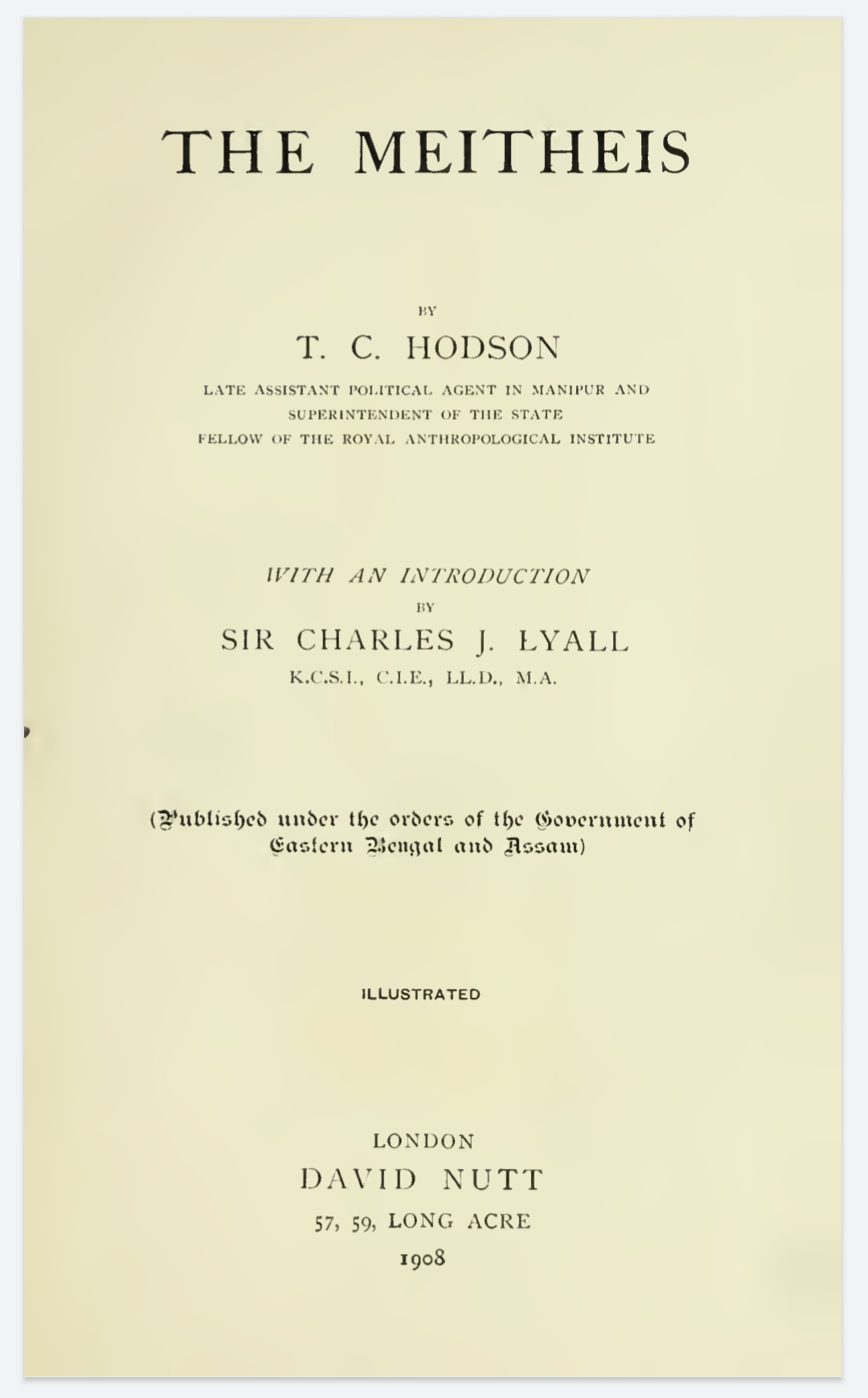
Title page of Hudson's book, The Meitheis (1908)

== Publications ==
- Thado Grammar, Eastern Bengal and Assam Secretariat Printing Office, 1905
- The Meitheis D. Nutt, 1908, reprinted by the Obscure Press 2006 ISBN 1-84664-437-2
- The Naga Tribes of Manipur, Macmillan 1911
- The primitive culture of India lectures delivered in 1922 at the School of Oriental Studies (University of London)
- India Delhi, Manager of Publications, 1937 ISBN 81-85059-03-9
- India Census Ethnography 1901-1931, 1937 ISBN 81-85059-03-9

Academic offices
Preceded by None - new position	William Wyse Professor of Social Anthropology Cambridge University; 1932 - 1937	Succeeded by John Henry Hutton
