= Jack Goody =

English social anthropologist (1919–2015)

Sir Jack Goody FBA
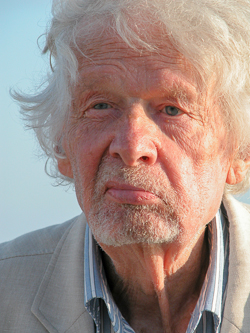
- Goody in 2009
- Born: John Rankine Goody; 27 July 1919; Hammersmith, England
- Died: 16 July 2015 (aged 95); Cambridge, England
- Spouses: Mary Joan Wright (divorced); Esther Newcomb Goody (m. 1956, divorced); Juliet Mitchell (m. 2000)

Academic background
- Education: University of Oxford; St John's College, Cambridge
- Doctoral advisor: Meyer Fortes
- Other advisor: E. E. Evans-Pritchard

Academic work
- Discipline: Anthropology
- Sub-discipline: Social anthropology
- Institutions: St John's College, Cambridge

Sir John Rankine Goody FBA (27 July 1919 – 16 July 2015) was an English social anthropologist. He was a prominent lecturer at Cambridge University, and was William Wyse Professor of Social Anthropology from 1973 to 1984.

Among his main publications were Death, property and the ancestors (1962), Technology, Tradition, and the State in Africa (1971), The myth of the Bagre (1972) and The domestication of the savage mind (1977).

== Early life and education ==
Born on 27 July 1919, he was the son of Harold Goody (1885–1969) and Lilian Rankine Goody (1885–1962). Goody grew up in Welwyn Garden City and St Albans, where he attended St Albans School. He went up to St John's College, Cambridge to study English literature in 1938, where he met leftist intellectuals like Eric Hobsbawm, Raymond Williams and E. P. Thompson.

== Military service ==
Goody left university to fight in World War II. Following officer training, he was commissioned into the Sherwood Foresters (Nottinghamshire and Derbyshire Regiment), British Army, on 23 March 1940 as a second lieutenant. Fighting in North Africa, he was captured by the Germans and spent three years in prisoner-of-war camps. At the end of the war he held the rank of lieutenant. Following his release, he returned to Cambridge to continue his studies.

He officially relinquished his commission on 19 January 1952.

== Academic career ==
Inspired by James George Frazer's Golden Bough and the archaeologist V. Gordon Childe, he transferred to Archaeology and Anthropology when he resumed university study in 1946. Meyer Fortes was his first mentor in Social Anthropology. After fieldwork with the LoWiili and LoDagaa peoples in northern Ghana, Goody increasingly turned to comparative study of Europe, Africa and Asia.

Between 1954 and 1984, he taught social anthropology at Cambridge University, serving as the William Wyse Professor of Social Anthropology from 1973 until 1984. He gave the Luce Lectures at Yale University—Fall 1987.

Goody pioneered the comparative anthropology of literacy, attempting to gauge the preconditions and effects of writing as a technology. He also published about the history of the family and the anthropology of inheritance. His later works were written on the anthropology of flowers and food.

== Later life ==
Goody died on 16 July 2015, aged 95. His funeral was held on 29 July at the West Chapel, Cambridge City Crematorium.

== Honours ==
In 1976, Goody was elected Fellow of the British Academy (FBA). He was an associate of the US National Academy of Sciences. In the 2005 Queen's Birthday Honours, he was appointed a Knight Bachelor "for services to Social Anthropology", and therefore granted the use of the title sir. In 2006, he was appointed Commandeur dans l'Ordre des Arts et des Lettres by the French Republic.

== Works ==
Jack Goody explained social structure and social change primarily in terms of three major factors. The first was the development of intensive forms of agriculture that allowed the accumulation of surplus – surplus explained many aspects of cultural practice from marriage to funerals as well as the great divide between African and Eurasian societies. Second, he explained social change in terms of urbanisation and growth of bureaucratic institutions that modified or overrode traditional forms of social organisation, such as family or tribe, identifying civilisation as "the culture of cities". And third, he attached great weight to the technologies of communication as instruments of psychological and social change. He associated the beginnings of writing with the task of managing surplus and, in a paper with Ian Watt (Goody and Watt 1963), he advanced the argument that the rise of science and philosophy in classical Greece depended on the invention of the alphabet. As these factors could be applied to any contemporary social system or to systematic changes over time, his work is equally relevant to many disciplines.

=== Books ===
- 1956 The Social Organisation of the LoWiili (London, HMSO), 2nd ed. 1976, London, published for the International African Institute by the Oxford University Press
- 1962 Death, Property and the Ancestors: A Study of the Mortuary Customs of the LoDagaa of West Africa, Stanford, Stanford University Press ISBN 0422980803
- 1968 ed., Literacy in Traditional Societies (Cambridge, Cambridge University Press); translated into German and Spanish.
- 1971 Technology, Tradition, and the State in Africa, Oxford, Oxford University Press
- 1971 The Developmental Cycle in Domestic Groups, Cambridge, Cambridge University Press ISBN 978-0521096607
- 1972 The Myth of the Bagre, Oxford, Oxford University Press ISBN 0198151349
- 1973 ed., The Character of Kinship, Cambridge, Cambridge University Press
- 1974 with Stanley Jeyaraja Tambiah, Bridewealth and Dowry, Cambridge, Cambridge University Press ISBN 978-0521201698
- 1976 Production and Reproduction: A Comparative Study of the Domestic Domain, Cambridge, Cambridge University Press ISBN 978-0521290883
- 1977 The Domestication of the Savage Mind, Cambridge, Cambridge University Press; translated into Spanish, French, Italian, Japanese, Portuguese, Turkish.
- 1982 Cooking, Cuisine and Class: A Study in Comparative Sociology, Cambridge, Cambridge University Press; translated into Spanish, French and Portuguese.
- 1983 The Development of the Family and Marriage in Europe, Cambridge, Cambridge University Press; translated into Spanish, French, Italian, Portuguese.
- 1986 The Logic of Writing and the Organisation of Society, Cambridge, Cambridge University Press; translated into Spanish, German, French, Italian, Polish, Portuguese.
- 1987 The Interface Between the Written and the Oral, Cambridge, Cambridge University Press ISBN 0521337941
- 1990 The Oriental, the Ancient and the Primitive: Systems of Marriage and the Family in the Pre-Industrial Societies of Eurasia (Studies in Literacy, the Family, Culture and the State), Cambridge, Cambridge University Press ISBN 0521367611
- 1993 The Culture of Flowers, Cambridge, Cambridge University Press; translated into French and Italian.
- 1995 The Expansive Moment: The Rise of Social Anthropology in Britain and Africa, 1918–1970, Cambridge, Cambridge University Press
- 1996 The East in the West, Cambridge, Cambridge University Press; translated into French and Italian.
- 1997 Representations and Contradictions: Ambivalence Towards Images, Theatre, Fictions, Relics and Sexuality, Oxford, Blackwell Publishers; translated into Spanish and French (Paris, La Découverte).
- 1998 Food and Love: A Cultural History of East and West, London, Verso ISBN 185984829X
- 2000 The European Family: An Historico-Anthropological Essay (Making of Europe), Oxford, Blackwell Publishers ISBN 978-0631201564
- 2000 The Power of the Written Tradition, Washington and London, Smithsonian Institution Press ISBN 978-1560989622
- 2004 Islam in Europe, Cambridge, Polity Press ISBN 0-7456-3193-2
- 2004 Capitalism and Modernity: The Great Debate, Cambridge, Polity Press ISBN 978-0745631905; translated into French, Polish and Turkish.
- 2004 Comparative Studies In Kinship, London and New York, Routledge ISBN 0415330106
- 2006 The Theft of History, Cambridge, Cambridge University Press ISBN 0521870690; translated into French, Italian, Spanish, Russian, Turkish.
- 2008 Family and Inheritance: Rural Society in Western Europe, 1200-1800, Cambridge, Cambridge University Press
- 2010 Myth, Ritual and the Oral, Cambridge, Cambridge University Press ISBN 978-0521768016 ; translated into French and Turkish
- 2010 Renaissances: The One or the Many?, Cambridge, Cambridge University Press ISBN 978-0521768016 ; translated into Chinese, French, Italian, Polish, Turkish
- 2012 Metals, Culture and Capitalism: An Essay on the Origins of the Modern World, Cambridge, Cambridge University Press
- 2018 Changing Social Structure in Ghana: Essays in the Comparative Sociology of a New State and an Old Tradition, London and New York, Routledge

=== Selected articles ===
- 1956 Jack Goody A Comparative Approach to Incest and Adultery, British Journal of Sociology, Vol. 7, No. 4 (Dec. 1956), pp. 286–305 doi:10.2307/586694 JSTOR 586694
- 1957 Fields of Social Control Among the LoDagaba The Journal of the Royal Anthropological Institute of Great Britain and Ireland, Vol. 87, No. 1 (Jan. – Jun. 1957), pp. 75–104 doi:10.2307/2843972 JSTOR 2843972
- GOODY, J. 1959. The Mother's Brother and the Sister's Son in West Africa, Journal of the Royal Anthropological Institute 89:61–88 response
- 1961 Jack Goody Religion and Ritual: The Definitional Problem The British Journal of Sociology, Vol. 12, No. 2 (Jun. 1961), pp. 142–164 doi:10.2307/586928 JSTOR 586928
- 1963 Jack Goody, Ian Watt The Consequences of Literacy Comparative Studies in Society and History, Vol. 5, No. 3 (Apr. 1963), pp. 304–345 JSTOR 177651
- 1969 Adoption in Cross-Cultural Perspective Comparative Studies in Society and History, Vol. 11, No. 1 (Jan. 1969), pp. 55–78 JSTOR 178288
- 1972 Taboo Words Man, New Series, Vol. 7, No. 1 (Mar. 1972), p. 137 JSTOR 2799863
- 1973 Goody, J. [Polygyny, economy and the role of women]. In J. Goody (Ed.), The character of kinship. Cambridge: Cambridge University Press, 1973
- 1973 Inheritance, Property, and Marriage in Africa and Eurasia Sociology, Vol. 3, No. 1, 55–76 (1969) doi:10.1177/003803856900300104
- Goody, Jack (1973) Bridewealth and Dowry in Africa and Eurasia in Bridewealth and Dowry, ed. J. Goody and S. Tambiah. Cambridge: Cambridge University Press
- Jack Goody, Joan Buckley Cross-Sex Patterns of Kin Behavior: A Comment Cross-Cultural Research, Vol. 9, No. 3, 185–202 (1974) doi:10.1177/106939717400900301
- 1977 Ethnology and/or Cultural Anthropology in Italy: Traditions and Developments [and Comments and Reply Vinigi Grottanelli, Giorgio Ausenda, Bernardo Bernardi, Ugo Bianchi, Y. Michal Bodemann, Jack Goody, Allison Jablonko, David I. Kertzer, Vittorio Lanternari, Antonio Marazzi, Roy A. Miller Jr., Laura Laurencich Minelli, David M. Moss, Leonard W. Moss, H. R. H. Prince Peter of Greece and Denmark, Diana Pinto, Pietro Scotti, Tullio Tentori. Current Anthropology, Vol. 18, No. 4 (Dec. 1977), pp. 593–614 JSTOR 2741501
- 1989 Futures of the Family in Rural Africa Population and Development Review, Vol. 15, Supplement: Rural Development and Population: Institutions and Policy (1989), pp. 119–144 doi:10.2307/2807924 JSTOR 2807924
- 1991 Towards a Room with a View: A Personal Account of Contributions to Local Knowledge, Theory, and Research in Fieldwork and Comparative Studies Annual Review of Anthropology, Vol. 20, 1991, pp. 1–23 JSTOR 2155791
- 1992 Culture and its boundaries: a European view Social Anthropology 1 (1a),9–32. doi:10.1111/j.1469-8676.1992.tb00238.x
- 1994 Jack Goody, Cesare Poppi Flowers and Bones: Approaches to the Dead in Anglo-American and Italian Cemeteries Comparative Studies in Society and History, Vol. 36, No. 1 (Jan. 1994), pp. 146–175 JSTOR 179330
- 1996 Comparing Family Systems in Europe and Asia: Are There Different Sets of Rules? Population and Development Review: 22 (1).
- 1996 Cognitive contradictions and universals: creation and evolution in oral cultures Social Anthropology Volume 4 Issue 1 Page 1-16, February 1996. doi:10.1111/j.1469-8676.1996.tb00310.x
- 2002 The Anthropology of the Senses and Sensations La Ricerca Folklorica, No. 45, Antropologia delle sensazioni (Apr. 2002), pp. 17–28 doi:10.2307/1480153 JSTOR 1480153
- 2004 The folktale and cultural history Cahiers de littérature orale n. 56, pp. 53–66
- 2006 From misery to luxury Social Science Information, Vol. 45, No. 3, 341–348 doi:10.1177/0539018406066526
- 2006 Gordon Childe, the Urban Revolution, and the Haute Cuisine: An Anthropo-archaeological View of Modern History Comparative Studies in Society and History (2006), 48: 503–519 (Issue 03 – May 2006) Cambridge University Press doi:10.1017/S0010417506000211

== Notes ==
Academic offices
Preceded by Meyer Fortes	William Wyse Professor of Social Anthropology; 1973–1984	Succeeded by Ernest Gellner
