= Jerry Berman =

South African engineer

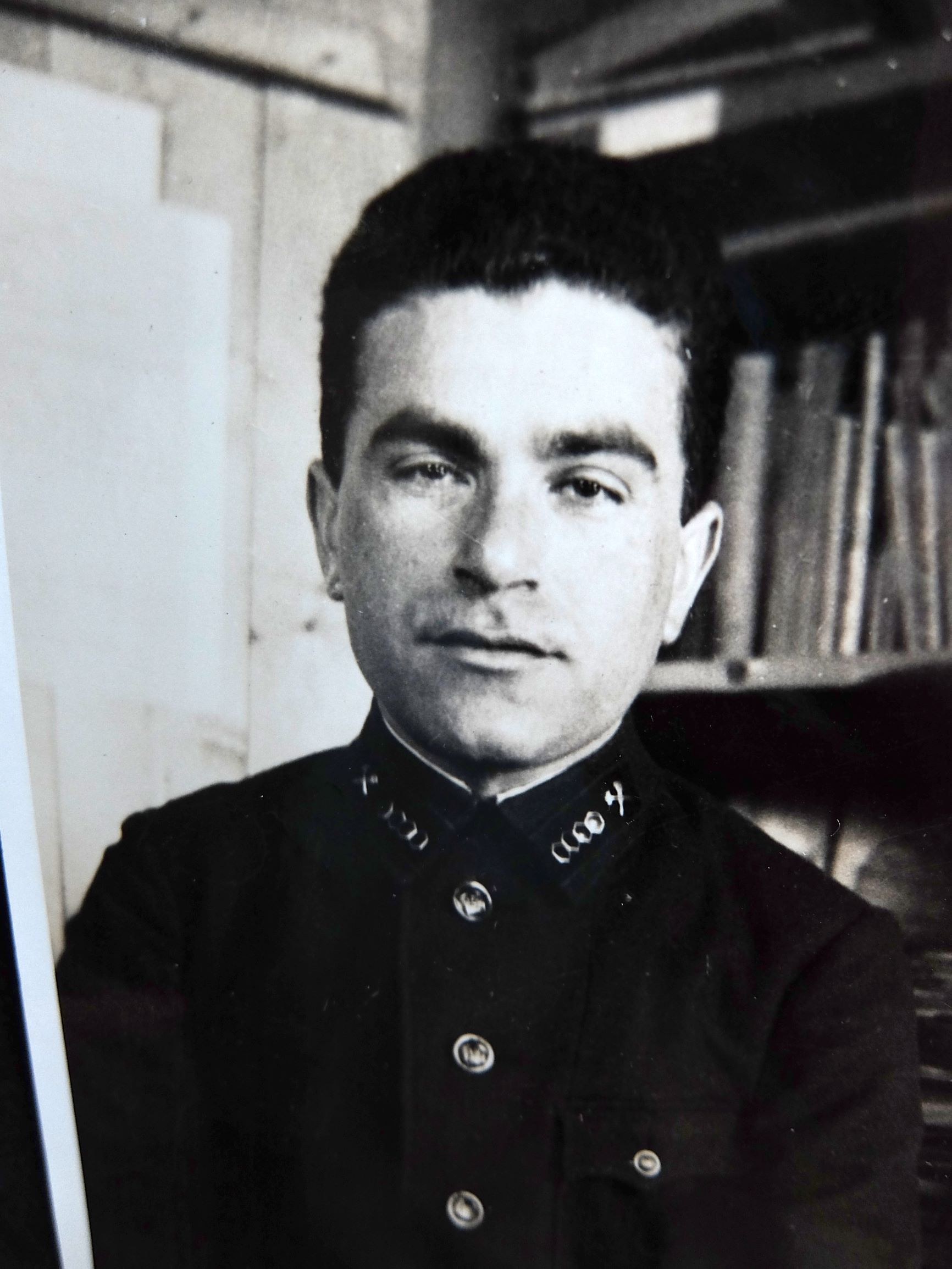
Jerry Berman was a South African engineer, a witness of the Holodomor, who left vivid testimonies in his letters to relatives and friends

Jerry Berman (1903, Pikeliai, Kėdainiai, now Lithuania – 1979, Cape Town, South Africa) was a South African engineer. He was a witness of the Holodomor, who left vivid testimonies in his letters to relatives and friends, which are currently kept in the National Museum of the Holodomor-Genocide in Kyiv.

== Biography ==
Jerry Berman was born in 1903 in the territory of modern Lithuania in a Jewish family. In 1921 he emigrated to South Africa.

In 1923, he enrolled in the Faculty of Civil Engineering at the University of Cape Town.

From 1932 to 1935, he worked in the Soviet Union, in the Donetsk and Luhansk regions, where he witnessed the Holodomor. He described his impressions in letters to his brother Israel, which the latter copied at Jerry's request and sent to several other recipients, including Jerry's friend Meyer Fortes in the UK. At his request, he was transferred to Nizhny Novgorod in Russia, where the food situation was better.

In 1935 he returned to South Africa. He supervised the construction of bridges and roads, achieved a high position in the ministry.

He got married in the 1940s, and a son was born in 1947. He retired in the late 1960s, died in 1979 in Cape Town.

In 2016, Alison Marshall, the granddaughter of Meyer Fortes, found Berman's letters. On the advice of the Ukrainian-British artist and researcher Sara Nesteruk, in 2021 she donated them to the National Museum of the Holodomor-Genocide.
