= Betty von Fürer-Haimendorf =

British ethnologist

- Betty von Fürer-Haimendorf, photographed in the 1930s.
- Born: Elizabeth Barnardo; 1911; Darbhanga, British India
- Died: 11 January 1987 (aged 75–76); Hyderabad, India
- Other names: Elizabeth von Furer-Haimendorf, Betty von Fuehrer-Haimendorf, Betty Fürer-Haimendorf

Betty von Fürer-Haimendorf (1911 – 11 January 1987), born Elizabeth Barnardo, was a British ethnologist in India and Nepal. She was married to Austrian ethnologist Christoph von Fürer-Haimendorf.

== Early life ==
Elizabeth Barnardo was born in Darbhanga, British India, one of the five children of Col. Frederick "Barnie" Barnardo and Violet Barnardo, of Bexhill. Her father, also born in British India, was a physician with the Indian Medical Service, nephew of Irish philanthropist Thomas John Barnardo, and dean of a medical school in Calcutta before 1921. Her mother died by suicide in 1942. In girlhood, Betty Barnardo was close to Patience Gray, who became a noted food writer. The two young women traveled together in central Europe in 1937.

== Career ==
Barnardo, who had trained as a nurse, worked closely with her husband on documenting the tribal cultures of northern India and Nepal. "No Himalayan pass was too high for her, no field site too remote," recalled a colleague in a 1987 obituary. She compiled the three-volume An anthropological bibliography of South Asia (1958). With her husband, she co-wrote The Reddis of the Bison hills: A study in acculturation (1945), The Raj Gonds of Adilabad: A peasant culture of the Deccan (1948), and The Gonds of Andhra Pradesh: Tradition and change in an Indian tribe (1979), Her diaries became an important source of her husband's 1990 memoir, Life Among Indian Tribes: the Autobiography of an Anthropologist.

== Personal life ==
In 1938, Elizabeth Barnardo married Christoph von Fürer-Haimendorf. They had a son, Nicholas, born in 1946. She died in 1987, in Hyderabad. The couple's papers are archived at the School of Oriental and African Studies (SOAS) at the University of London.
