= Julius Gellner =

German-speaking theatre director (1899–1983)

Julius Gellner (German: [ˈɡɛlnɐ]; 25 April 1899, Saaz, Austria-Hungary – 24 October 1983, London) was one of the most famous German-speaking theatre directors of the 1920s. Between 1924 and 1933, he was superintendent (Oberspielleiter) and vice-director of the Munich theater "Münchner Kammerspiele im Schauspielhaus". He was the uncle of the British philosopher and social scientist Ernest Gellner.

== Biography ==
Julius Gellner was the ninth child of Anna (née Löbl) and Max Gellner. The family later moved from Saaz to Prague, where Julius apprenticed as a bank clerk. His strong affinity for acting became apparent during this time after he joined an amateur theatre group.

Once he had accumulated enough savings to jump into the theatre world, he moved to Würzburg in 1918. After some initial difficulties, he managed to get a position as an actor and an opportunity to prove himself on the stage. In the course of his nascent acting career, he also took positions in Berlin and Düsseldorf. In Düsseldorf he was discovered by the director of the Munich Kammerspiele, Otto Falckenberg, who took him to Munich in 1921.
