= Gellner's theory of nationalism =

Modernist theory by Ernest Gellner

Gellner's theory of nationalism was developed by Ernest Gellner over a number of publications from around the early 1960s to his 1995 death. Gellner discussed nationalism in a number of works, starting with Thought and Change (1964), and he most notably developed it in Nations and Nationalism (1983). His theory is modernist.

== Characteristics ==
Gellner defined nationalism as "primarily a political principle which holds that the political and the national unit should be congruent" and as

the general imposition of a high culture on society, where previously low cultures had taken up the lives of the majority, and in some cases the totality, of the population. It means the general diffusion of a school-mediated, academy supervised idiom, codified for the requirements of a reasonably precise bureaucratic and technological communication. It is the establishment of an anonymous impersonal society, with mutually sustainable atomised individuals, held together above all by a shared culture of this kind, in place of the previous complex structure of local groups, sustained by folk cultures reproduced locally and idiosyncratically by the micro-groups themselves.

Gellner analyzed nationalism by a historical perspective. He saw the history of humanity culminating in the discovery of modernity, nationalism being a key functional element. Modernity, by changes in political and economic system, is tied to the popularization of education, which, in turn, is tied to the unification of language. However, as modernization spread around the world, it did so slowly, and in numerous places, cultural elites were able to resist cultural assimilation and defend their own culture and language successfully.

For Gellner, nationalism was a sociological condition and a likely but not guaranteed (he noted exceptions in multilingual states like Switzerland, Belgium and Canada) result of modernisation, the transition from agrarian to industrial society. His theory focused on the political and cultural aspects of that transition. In particular, he focused on the unifying and culturally homogenising roles of the educational systems, national labour markets and improved communication and mobility in the context of urbanisation. He thus argued that nationalism was highly compatible with industrialisation and served the purpose of replacing the ideological void left by both the disappearance of the prior agrarian society culture and the political and economical system of feudalism, which it legitimised.

Thomas Hylland Eriksen lists these as "some of the central features of nationalism" in Gellner's theory:

- Shared, formal educational system
- Cultural homogenisation and "Social entropy"
- Central monitoring of polity, with extensive bureaucratic control
- Linguistic standardisation
- National identification as abstract community
- Cultural similarity as a basis for political legitimacy
- Anonymity, single-stranded social relationships

Gellner also provided a typology of "nationalism-inducing and nationalism-thwarting situations".

Gellner criticised a number of other theoretical explanations of nationalism, including the "naturality theory", which states that it is "natural, self-evident and self-generating" and a basic quality of human being, and a neutral or a positive quality; its dark version, the "Dark Gods theory", which sees nationalism as an inevitable expression of basic human atavistic, irrational passions; and Elie Kedourie's idealist argument that it was an accidental development, an intellectual error of disseminating unhelpful ideas, and not related to industrialisation and the Marxist theory in which nations appropriated the leading role of social classes. On October 24, 1995, at Warwick University, Gellner debated one of his former students, Anthony D. Smith, in what became known as the Warwick Debates. Smith presented an ethnosymbolist view; Gellner a modernist one. The debate has been described as epitomizing their positions.

== Influence ==
Gellner is considered one of the leading theoreticians on nationalism. Eriksen notes that "nobody contests Ernest Gellner's central place in the research on nationalism over the last few decades". O'Leary refers to the theory as "the best-known modernist explanatory theory of nationalism".

== Criticisms ==
Gellner's theory has been subject to various criticisms:

- It is too functionalist, as it explains the phenomenon with reference to the eventual historical outcome that industrial society could not 'function' without nationalism.
- It misreads the relationship between nationalism and industrialisation.
- It accounts poorly for national movements of Ancient Rome and Greece since it insists that nationalism is tied to modernity and so cannot exist without a clearly defined modern industrialisation.
- It fails to account for either nationalism in non-industrial society and resurgences of nationalism in post-industrial society.
- It fails to account for nationalism in 16th-century Europe.
- It cannot explain the passions generated by nationalism and why anyone should fight and die for a country.
- It fails to take into account either the role of war and the military in fostering both cultural homogenisation and nationalism or the relationship between militarism and compulsory education.
- It has been compared to technological determinism, as it disregards the views of individuals.

Philip Gorski has argued that modernization theorists, such as Gellner, have gotten the timing of nationalism wrong: nationalism existed prior to modernity, and even had medieval roots.
