= Nations and Nationalism (book) =

1983 book by the philosopher Ernest Gellner

- Author: Ernest Gellner
- Language: English
- Genre: Non-fiction
- Publication date: 1983

Nations and Nationalism is an influential 1983 book by the philosopher Ernest Gellner, in which the author expands on his theory of nationalism.

O'Leary describes the book as "Gellner's most elaborate statement on the subject (of nationalism); because it is largely an expansion of the themes first sketched in Thought and Change.... he never repudiated any of the core propositions advanced in these texts", but he clarifies and qualifies some of them further in his Encounters with Nationalism (1994).

== See also ==
- Gellner's theory of nationalism
- Nations and Nationalism (journal)

== Sources ==
- Menes, Bonnie (November 1985). "Nations and Nationalism. By Ernest Gellner. 1983 (book review)". American Journal of Sociology. 91 (3): 720–722. doi:10.1086/228331. JSTOR 2780219.
