= Christoph von Fürer-Haimendorf =

Austrian ethnologist and professor

Christoph von Fürer-Haimendorf FRAI
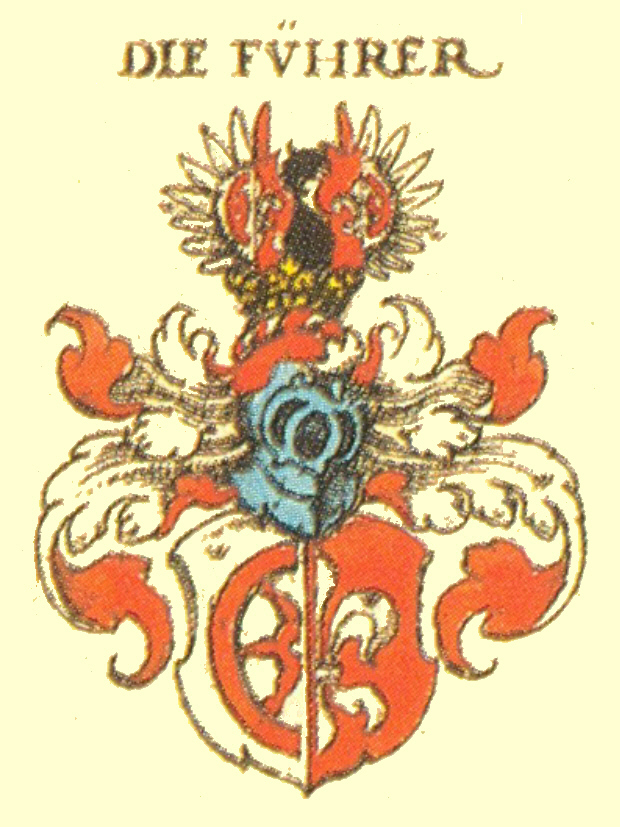
- Coat of arms of the House of Fürer-Haimendorf
- Born: Christopher von Fürer-Haimendorf; 22 June 1909
- Died: 11 June 1995 (aged 85)
- Occupation: Ethnologist
- Years active: 1943–1982
- Known for: Fieldwork in Northeast India and in the central region of what is now the state of Telangana and in Nepal
- Notable work: The Chenchus, The Reddis of the Bison Hills, The Raj Gonds of Adilibad
- Spouse: Betty Barnardo

Christoph von Fürer-Haimendorf or Christopher von Fürer-Haimendorf FRAI (22 June 1909 – 11 June 1995) was an Austrian ethnologist and professor at the School of Oriental and African Studies at London. He spent forty years studying tribal cultures in Northeast India, in the central region of what is now the state of Telangana and in Nepal. He was married to British ethnologist of India and Nepal, Betty Barnardo.

== Biography ==
Christoph von Fürer-Haimendorf was born in an Austrian aristocratic family. Very early he developed an interest in Indian culture, having read Rabindranath Tagore as a young man.

He studied anthropology and archaeology in Vienna and there he was most influenced by Robert von Heine-Geldern. He wrote his thesis on the tribal social organization of the peoples of Assam and northwestern Burma (Staat und Gesellschaft bei den Völkern Assams und des nordwestlichen Birmas) and in later years was inspired by John Henry Hutton, a fellow researcher of the tribal communities in that region.

After his thesis, von Fürer-Haimendorf moved to London in order to establish contact with the main anthropologists of his time, such as Bronislaw Malinowski. By 1936 he traveled to India, where he worked among the Naga people and established good friendships among the local administrators of the British Raj. After five months and great effort, he succeeded in learning the local language and was able to do without an interpreter. From then onwards, von Fürer-Haimendorf would insist that it was of the utmost importance for an ethnologist or ethnographer to learn well the language of the people who were the subject of the fieldwork in order to be competent in his or her studies.

In 1938, von Fürer-Haimendorf married Betty Barnardo, a colleague. At the time he only made a brief visit to Europe and returned to India, so that at the outbreak of World War II he found himself in British territory holding a Third Reich passport. He was arrested by the colonial authorities, but with a great degree of politeness and sadness, for they were good friends of his. Thus he was confined to Hyderabad State in South India. As time went by von Fürer-Haimendorf earned the trust of the local authorities, who could see that he had no Nazi sympathies. He was then able to do some of his best fieldwork ever while living among the Chenchu, Bhil, Reddi and the Raj Gond Adivasi of present-day interior Telangana.

Thanks to friendly government officers, which included fellow ethnologist Verrier Elwin, von Fürer-Haimendorf was able to obtain a post as Special Officer and Assistant Political Officer to the North East Frontier Agency, so he could move back to Northeast India. He studied the Apatanis in 1944–45, when there were tensions in the area owing to the Japanese conquest of Burma.

When the war was over von Fürer-Haimendorf was named Advisor for Tribes and Backward Classes to the Nizam's Government of Hyderabad and returned to the South where he continued to do ethnographic fieldwork while he was engaged as government officer. In 1953, when the Kingdom of Nepal opened to the outside world, von Fürer-Haimendorf did not want to lose the opportunity to visit the then little-known country and became the first foreigner who was able to do research among the peoples of Nepal.

Christoph von Fürer-Haimendorf lived his old age in London, where he became professor of anthropology at the School of Oriental and African Studies. In 1987, following the death of his wife, his health suffered a decline from which he did not recover. He died on 11 June 1995 and was buried in London.

== Works ==
Von Fürer-Haimendorf published 3,650 pages of ethnographic notes and took more than 10,000 photographs. He also shot a total of over 100 hours of 16 mm documentary films, giving a glimpse on the way of life of certain little-known cultures that were poised to change irreversibly.

- Published writings:
  - The Naked Nagas (1939)
  - The Chenchus (1943)
  - The Reddis of the Bison Hills (1945)
  - The Raj Gonds of Adilabad (1948)
  - The Apatanis and their neighbours (1962)
  - Morals and merit (1967)
  - The Sherpas of Nepal (1964)
  - The Bagoria Bhil (1964)
  - The Konyak Nagas (1969)
  - Himalayan Traders: Life in Highland Nepal (1975)
  - Return to the naked Nagas: an anthropologist's view of Nagaland 1936–1970 (1976)
  - Tribes of India: The Struggle for Survival (1982)
- Films:
  - The Men Who Hunted Heads (1970)
  - The land of the Gurkhas (1957)
  - The land of Dolpo (1962)

== Archives ==
The papers and photographs of Christoph von Fürer-Haimendorf are held by SOAS Archives. In 2010, more than 14,000 of these images were digitised and are available online here.

== See also ==
- Kulturkreis
- Paul Hockings
- Stephen Fuchs
