= Rebecca Cassidy =

British social anthropologist and academic

Rebecca Louise Cassidy, FBA (born 30 March 1973) is a British social anthropologist and academic. She has been the William Wyse Professor of Social Anthropology at the University of Cambridge since 2025. She previously taught at Goldsmiths, University of London.

== Academic career ==
Cassidy began her career at Goldsmiths, University of London, becoming a lecturer in 2002. She was promoted to senior lecturer in 2006 and appointed Professor of Anthropology in 2009. In January 2025, she was elected as the next William Wyse Professor of Social Anthropology at the University of Cambridge. She took up the appointment on 1 October 2025. By July 2026, she had also been elected a bye-fellow of King's College, Cambridge.

Her research has been wide-ranging, from fruit cultivation, to horse breeding and racing, to gambling. She has undertaken fieldwork in Europe, the United States, and Central Asia.

In July 2026, she was elected Fellow of the British Academy (FBA), the United Kingdom's national academy for the humanities and social sciences.

== Selected works ==
- Cassidy, Rebecca (2002). The Sport of Kings: Kinship, Class and Thoroughbred Breeding in Newmarket. Cambridge: Cambridge University Press. ISBN 978-0521808774.
- Cassidy, Rebecca, ed. (2013). The Cambridge Companion to Horseracing. Cambridge: Cambridge University Press. ISBN 978-1107618367.
- Cassidy, Rebecca; Pisac, Andrea; Loussouarn, Claire, eds. (2013). Qualitative Research in Gambling: Exploring the production and consumption of risk. Routledge. ISBN 978-1-134-44585-1.
- Cassidy, Rebecca (2020). Vicious games: capitalism and gambling. London: Pluto press. ISBN 978-0745340388.
