= William Wyse Professor of Social Anthropology =

Chair in the University of Cambridge

The William Wyse Professorship of Social Anthropology is a professorship in social anthropology at the University of Cambridge. It was founded on 18 June 1932 and endowed partly with the support of Trinity College from money bequeathed to them by William Wyse, formerly Fellow and Honorary Fellow of Trinity.

The professorship is assigned to the Faculty of Archaeology and Anthropology.

== List of William Wyse Professors of Social Anthropology ==
- 1932–1937 – Thomas Callan Hodson
- 1937–1950 – John Henry Hutton
- 1950–1973 – Meyer Fortes
- 1973–1984 – Jack Goody
- 1984–1992 – Ernest André Gellner
- 1993–2008 – Marilyn Strathern
- 2008–2014 – Henrietta Moore
- 2016–2024 – James Laidlaw
- From September 2025 – Rebecca Cassidy
