= Linguistic philosophy =

Linguistic philosophy may refer to:

- Linguistic turn, a major focus on analyzing language in early-20th century Western philosophy
- Ordinary language philosophy
- Philosophy of language, the study of the nature of language
- Philosophy of linguistics, the study of the foundations, methods, and implications of the science of linguistics
