= Ernest Gellner =

Czech anthropologist, philosopher and sociologist (1925–1995)

Ernest Gellner FRAI
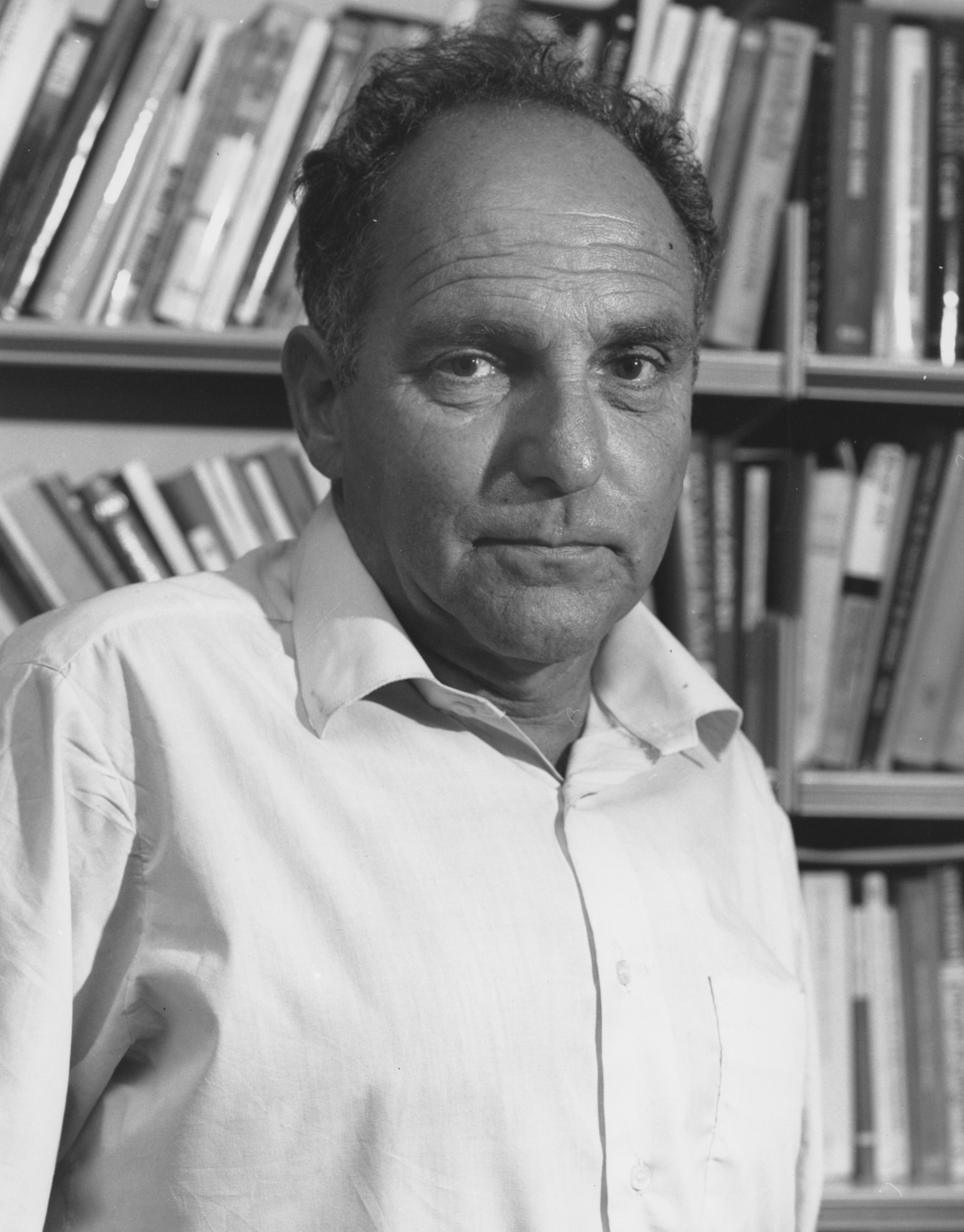
- Born: 9 December 1925; Paris, France
- Died: 5 November 1995 (aged 69); Prague, Czech Republic
- Relatives: Julius Gellner (uncle)

Education
- Education: Balliol College, Oxford
- Doctoral advisor: Raymond Firth

Philosophical work
- Era: 20th-century philosophy
- Region: Western philosophy
- School: Critical rationalism Analytic philosophy (early)
- Institutions: University of Edinburgh; London School of Economics; King's College, Cambridge; Central European University
- Main interests: Political philosophy, philosophy of science, anthropology, nationalism
- Notable ideas: Gellner's theory of nationalism Criticism of ordinary language philosophy

Ernest André Gellner (German: [ˈɡɛlnɐ]; 9 December 1925 – 5 November 1995) was a French-born British-Czech philosopher and social anthropologist. Central themes in his social thought included modernisation theory and nationalism, the latter of which he developed into a leading theory (Gellner's theory of nationalism). His multicultural perspective allowed him to engage with the Western world and the Muslim world.

His first book, Words and Things (1959), sparked a leading article in The Times, which then published a month-long correspondence on his analytical critique of linguistic philosophy. Gellner served for 22 years as Professor of Philosophy, Logic and Scientific Method at the London School of Economics, eight years as the William Wyse Professor of Social Anthropology at the University of Cambridge, and later headed the new Centre for the Study of Nationalism in Prague.

Throughout his career, in writing, teaching and political activism, Gellner challenged what he saw as closed systems of thought. At his death, The Independent called him a "one-man crusader for critical rationalism", and The Daily Telegraph called him one of the world's most vigorous intellectuals.

== Background ==
Gellner was born in Paris to Anna, née Fantl, and Rudolf, a lawyer, an urban intellectual German-speaking Austrian Jewish couple from Bohemia (which, since 1918, was part of the newly established Czechoslovakia). Julius Gellner was his uncle. He was brought up in Prague, attending a Czech language primary school before entering the English-language grammar school. This was Franz Kafka's tricultural Prague: antisemitic but "stunningly beautiful", a city he later spent years longing for.

In 1939, when Gellner was 13, the rise of Adolf Hitler in Germany persuaded his family to leave Czechoslovakia and move to St Albans, just north of London, where Gellner attended St Albans Boys Modern School, now Verulam School (Hertfordshire). At the age of 17, he won a scholarship to Balliol College, Oxford, as a result of what he called "Portuguese colonial policy", which involved keeping "the natives peaceful by getting able ones from below into Balliol."

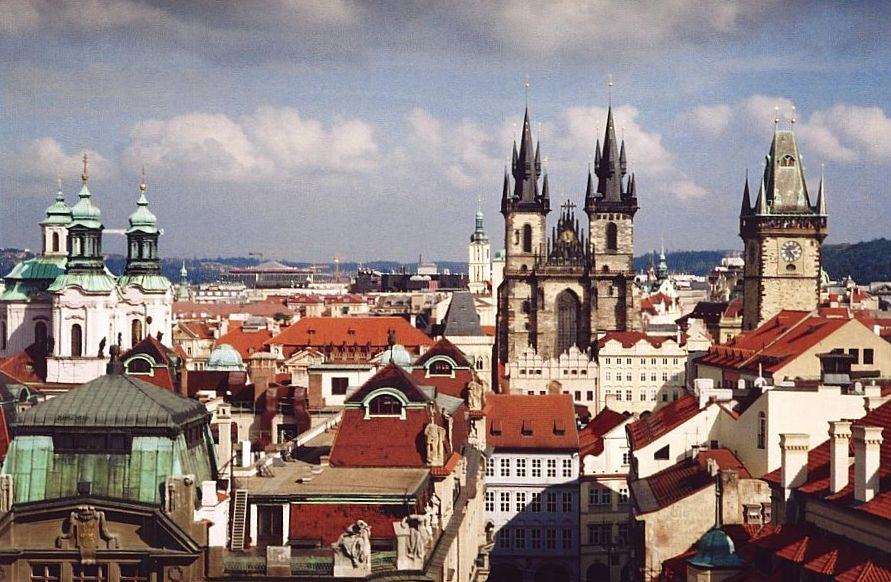
"Prague is a stunningly beautiful town, and during the first period of my exile, which was during the war, I constantly used to dream about it, in the literal sense: it was a strong longing."

At Balliol, he studied Philosophy, Politics and Economics (PPE) and specialised in philosophy. He interrupted his studies after one year to serve with the 1st Czechoslovak Armoured Brigade, which took part in the Siege of Dunkirk (1944–45), and then returned to Prague to attend university there for half a term.

During this period, Prague lost its strong hold over him: foreseeing the communist takeover, he decided to return to England. One of his recollections of the city in 1945 was a communist poster saying: "Everyone with a clean shield into the Party", ostensibly meaning that those whose records were good during the occupation were welcome. In reality, Gellner said, it meant exactly the opposite:

If your shield is absolutely filthy we'll scrub it for you; you are safe with us; we like you the better because the filthier your record the more we have a hold on you. So all the bastards, all the distinctive authoritarian personalities, rapidly went into the Party, and it rapidly acquired this kind of character. So what was coming was totally clear to me, and it cured me of the emotional hold which Prague had previously had over me. I could foresee that a Stalinoid dictatorship was due: it came in '48. The precise date I couldn't foresee, but that it was due to come was absolutely obvious for various reasons.... I wanted no part of it and got out as quickly as I could and forgot about it.

He returned to Balliol College in 1945 to finish his degree, winning the John Locke prize and taking first class honours in 1947. The same year, he began his academic career at the University of Edinburgh as an assistant to Professor John Macmurray in the Department of Moral Philosophy. He moved to the London School of Economics in 1949, joining the sociology department under Morris Ginsberg. Ginsberg admired philosophy and believed that philosophy and sociology were very close to each other.

He employed me because I was a philosopher. Even though he was technically a professor of sociology, he wouldn't employ his own students, so I benefited from this, and he assumed that anybody in philosophy would be an evolutionary Hobhousean like himself. It took him some time to discover that I wasn't.

Leonard Trelawny Hobhouse had preceded Ginsberg as Martin White Professor of Sociology at the LSE. Hobhouse's Mind in Evolution (1901) had proposed that society should be regarded as an organism, a product of evolution, with the individual as its basic unit, the subtext being that society would improve over time as it evolved, a teleological view that Gellner firmly opposed.

Ginsberg... was totally unoriginal and lacked any sharpness. He simply reproduced the kind of evolutionary rationalistic vision which had already been formulated by Hobhouse and which incidentally was a kind of extrapolation of his own personal life: starting in Poland and ending up as a fairly influential professor at LSE. He evolved, he had an idea of a great chain of being where the lowest form of life was the drunk, Polish, anti-Semitic peasant and the next stage was the Polish gentry, a bit better, or the Staedtl, better still. And then he came to England, first to University College under Dawes Hicks, who was quite rational (not all that rational—he still had some anti-Semitic prejudices, it seems) and finally ended up at LSE with Hobhouse, who was so rational that rationality came out of his ears. And so Ginsberg extrapolated this, and on his view the whole of humanity moved to ever greater rationality, from drunk Polish peasant to T.L. Hobhouse and a Hampstead garden.

Gellner's critique of linguistic philosophy in Words and Things (1959) focused on J. L. Austin and the later work of Ludwig Wittgenstein, criticising them for failing to question their own methods. The book brought Gellner critical acclaim. He obtained his Ph.D. in 1961 with a thesis on Organisation and the Role of a Berber Zawiya and became Professor of Philosophy, Logic and Scientific Method just one year later. Thought and Change was published in 1965, and in State and Society in Soviet Thought (1988), he examined whether Marxist regimes could be liberalised.

He was elected to the British Academy in 1974. He moved to Cambridge in 1984 to head the Department of Anthropology, holding the William Wyse chair and becoming a fellow of King's College, Cambridge, which provided him with a relaxed atmosphere where he enjoyed drinking beer and playing chess with the students. Described by the Oxford Dictionary of National Biography as "brilliant, forceful, irreverent, mischievous, sometimes perverse, with a biting wit and love of irony", he was famously popular with his students, was willing to spend many extra hours a day tutoring them, and was regarded as a superb public speaker and gifted teacher.

His Plough, Sword and Book (1988) investigated the philosophy of history, and Conditions of Liberty (1994) sought to explain the collapse of socialism with an analogy he called "modular man". In 1993, he returned to Prague, now rid of communism, and to the new Central European University, where he became head of the Center for the Study of Nationalism, a program funded by George Soros, the American billionaire philanthropist, to study the rise of nationalism in the post-communist countries of eastern and central Europe. On 5 November 1995, after returning from a conference in Budapest, he had a heart attack and died at his flat in Prague, one month short of his 70th birthday.

Gellner was a member of both the American Academy of Arts and Sciences and the American Philosophical Society.

== Words and Things ==
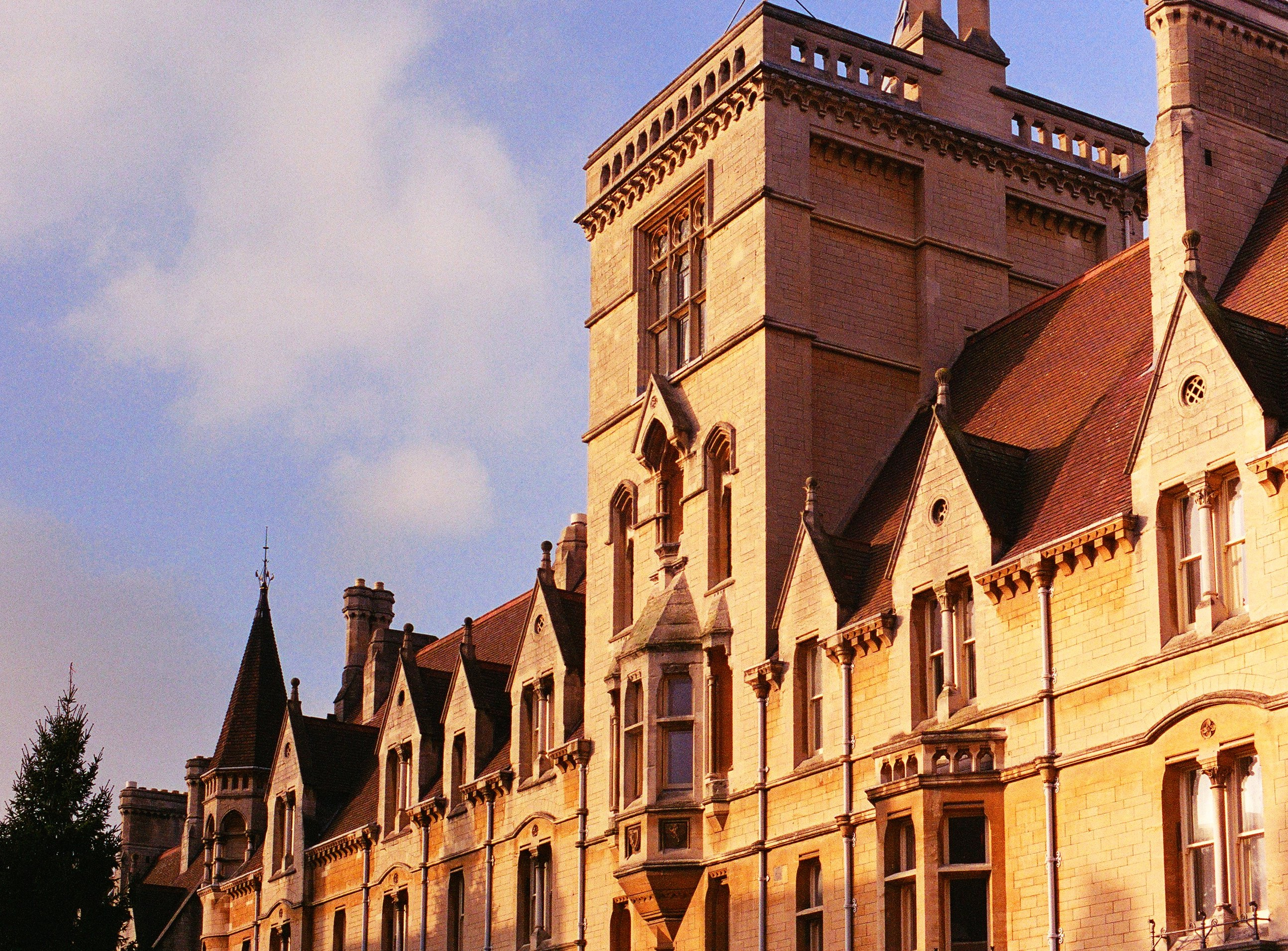
Gellner discovered his interest in linguistic philosophy while at Balliol.

With the publication in 1959 of Words and Things, his first book, Gellner achieved fame and even notoriety among his fellow philosophers, as well as outside the discipline, for his fierce attack on "linguistic philosophy", as he preferred to call ordinary language philosophy, then the dominant approach at Oxbridge (although the philosophers themselves denied that they were part of any unified school). He first encountered the predominance of linguistic philosophy while at Balliol:

[A]t that time the orthodoxy best described as linguistic philosophy, inspired by Wittgenstein, was crystallizing and seemed to me totally and utterly misguided. Wittgenstein's basic idea was that there is no general solution to issues other than the custom of the community. Communities are ultimate. He didn't put it this way, but that was what it amounted to. And this doesn't make sense in a world in which communities are not stable and are not clearly isolated from each other. Nevertheless, Wittgenstein managed to sell this idea, and it was enthusiastically adopted as an unquestionable revelation. It is very hard nowadays for people to understand what the atmosphere was like then. This was the Revelation. It wasn't doubted. But it was quite obvious to me it was wrong. It was obvious to me the moment I came across it, although initially, if your entire environment, and all the bright people in it, hold something to be true, you assume you must be wrong, not understanding it properly, and they must be right. And so I explored it further and finally came to the conclusion that I did understand it right, and it was rubbish, which indeed it is.

Words and Things is fiercely critical of the work of Ludwig Wittgenstein, J. L. Austin, Gilbert Ryle, Antony Flew, P. F. Strawson and many others. Ryle refused to have the book reviewed in the philosophical journal Mind (which he edited), and Bertrand Russell (who had written an approving foreword) protested in a letter to The Times. A response from Ryle and a lengthy correspondence ensued. Ryle explained his refusal to review the book in a letter to Gellner's publisher, he said that "Abusiveness may make a book saleable, but it disqualifies it from being treated as a contribution to an academic subject".

== Social anthropology ==
In the 1950s, Gellner discovered his great love of social anthropology. Chris Hann, director of the Max Planck Institute for Social Anthropology, writes that following the hard-nosed empiricism of Bronisław Malinowski, Gellner made major contributions to the subject over the next 40 years, ranging from "conceptual critiques in the analysis of kinship to frameworks for understanding political order outside the state in tribal Morocco (Saints of the Atlas, 1969); from sympathetic exposition of the works of Soviet Marxist anthropologists to elegant syntheses of the Durkheimian and Weberian traditions in western social theory; and from grand elaboration of 'the structure of human history' to path-breaking analyses of ethnicity and nationalism (Thought and Change, 1964; Nations and Nationalism, 1983)". He also developed a friendship with the Moroccan-French sociologist Paul Pascon, whose work he admired.

== Nationalism ==
In 1983, Gellner published Nations and Nationalism. For Gellner, "nationalism is primarily a political principle that holds that the political and the national unit should be congruent". Gellner argues that nationalism appeared and became a sociological necessity only in the modern world. In previous times ("the agro-literate" stage of history), rulers had little incentive to impose cultural homogeneity on the ruled. But in modern society, work becomes technical; one must operate a machine, and to do so, one must learn. There is a need for impersonal, context-free communication and a high degree of cultural standardisation.

Furthermore, industrial society is underlined by the fact that there is perpetual growth: employment types vary and new skills must be learned. Thus, generic employment training precedes specialised job training. On a territorial level, there is competition for the overlapping catchment areas (such as Alsace-Lorraine). To maintain its grip on resources and its survival and progress, the state and culture must for these reasons be congruent. Nationalism, therefore, is a necessity.

== Selected works ==
- Words and Things: A Critical Account of Linguistic Philosophy and a Study in Ideology, London: Gollancz; Boston: Beacon (1959). Also see correspondence in The Times, 10 November to 23 November 1959.
- Thought and Change (1964)
- Populism: Its Meaning and Characteristics (1969). With Ghiță Ionescu. New York: Macmillan.
- Saints of the Atlas (1969)
- Contemporary Thought and Politics (1974)
- The Devil in Modern Philosophy (1974)
- Legitimation of Belief (1974)
- Spectacles and Predicaments (1979)
- Soviet and Western Anthropology (1980) (editor)
- Muslim Society (1981)
- Nations and Nationalism (1983)
- Relativism and the Social Sciences (1985)
- The Psychoanalytic Movement (1985)
- The Concept of Kinship and Other Essays (1986)
- Culture, Identity, and Politics (1987)
- State and Society in Soviet Thought (1988)
- Plough, Sword and Book (1988) ISBN 9780226287027
- Postmodernism, Reason and Religion (1992)
- Reason and Culture (1992)
- Conditions of Liberty (1994)
- Encounters with nationalism (1994)
- Anthropology and Politics: Revolutions in the Sacred Grove (1995)
- Liberalism in Modern Times: Essays in Honour of José G. Merquior (1996)
- Nationalism (1997)
- Language and Solitude: Wittgenstein, Malinowski, and the Habsburg Dilemma (1998)
- Cause and Meaning in the Social Sciences (2003)

== Notes ==
Academic offices
| Preceded by Jack Goody | William Wyse Professor of Social Anthropology Cambridge University; 1984–1992 | Succeeded by Marilyn Strathern |
