= John Henry Hutton =

English-born anthropologist and administrator

J. H. Hutton CIE FRAI
- Born: 27 June 1885
- Died: 23 May 1968 (aged 82)

John Henry Hutton CIE FRAI (27 June 1885 – 23 May 1968) was an English-born anthropologist and an administrator in the Indian Civil Service (ICS) during the period of the British Raj. The period that he spent with the ICS in Assam evoked an interest in tribal cultures of that region that was of seminal importance. His research work was recognised subsequently with his appointment to the chair of William Wyse Professor of Social Anthropology at the University of Cambridge and with various honours.

== Early life ==
John Henry Hutton was the son of a Church of England clergyman. He was born on 27 June 1885 at West Heslerton, then in the East Riding of Yorkshire and now in North Yorkshire. He attended Chigwell School in Essex and then obtained a third-class degree in modern history from Worcester College, Oxford in 1907.

== Career ==
Hutton joined the ICS in 1909, spending most of his career in India in Assam. He held positions as a Political Officer and as a Deputy Commissioner, for which his duties included undertaking lengthy tours within the Assam region to inspect facilities and infrastructure as well as to settle legal disputes. To his role as Deputy Commissioner was added in 1920 that of Honorary Director of Ethnography for Assam. Between 1929 and 1933 he was Census Commissioner, having responsibility for organising the 1931 census of India and compiling the subsequent report on it.

Hutton's interest in anthropology was piqued by his appointment in Assam. He was encouraged in his researches by Henry Balfour of the Pitt Rivers Museum, who visited Hutton in the Naga hills. Hutton published many works on the tribal culture of the area, including the seminal The Angami Nagas and The Sema Nagas, which earned him a DSc from the University of Oxford in 1921. Later, during official discussions about the formulation of the Government of India Act 1935, Hutton worked with some success to protect the interests of tribal minorities despite opposition from Indian nationalists who suspected that it was a scheme intended to divide the country.

Hutton resigned from the ICS in 1936 for family reasons, and possibly also because he wanted to devote more time to his research. In 1937, he succeeded T. C. Hodson as William Wyse Professor of Social Anthropology at Cambridge University, where he was also elected a Fellow of St. Catharine's College. In writing Caste in India, published in 1946, he was able to draw on his experiences in charge of the 1931 census. In other works he demonstrated an interest in comparative anthropology, writing of possible links between the culture of the eastern Himalayas and other megalithic cultures in south-east Asia and in Oceania. He retired from his professorship in 1950 and was made an honorary fellow of St. Catharine's in 1951.

== Death ==
Hutton died on 23 May 1968 at his home in New Radnor, Radnorshire. A fellow anthropologist of India, Christoph von Fürer-Haimendorf, said in an obituary that the death of Hutton "...ended a chapter in the history of British anthropology. He was the last of the distinguished class of civil servants who in their time contributed so greatly to the knowledge of the indigenous peoples of Britain's far-flung empire and in a later phase of their career achieved positions of eminence in academic life."

== Family ==
Hutton married Stella Eleanora Bishop, a widow, in 1920. The couple had two sons and a daughter. Stella died in 1944 and in 1945 he married Maureen Margaret O'Reilly.

== Honours and legacy ==
Hutton had assisted in quelling a rebellion by the Kuki tribal people between 1917 and 1919 and was appointed a Companion of the Order of the Indian Empire (CIE) for that work on 5 June 1920. He was High Sheriff of Radnorshire in 1943 and President of the Royal Anthropological Institute of Great Britain and Ireland (RAI) in 1944–45. He had won the Rivers Memorial Medal, awarded by the RAI, in 1929 and the silver medal of the Royal Society of Arts in 1932. He gave the Frazer Lecture in 1938.

Kathleen Gough was among his doctoral students and von Fürer-Haimendorf was among those who were inspired by him. He loaned to the Pitt Rivers Museum, and later donated, his collection of tribal materials accumulated while in Assam.

Coat of arms of John Henry Hutton

Notes
Granted by Sir Nevile Rodwell Wilkinson, 15th September 1937.
Crest
A crescent Sable issuant therefrom flames Proper.
Escutcheon
Or three annulets Gules a canton Pean.
Motto
Dat Deus Incrementum

== Publications ==
Book cover of Hutton's The Sema Nagas (1921).

Among Hutton's publications are:

- The Angami Nagas: With some notes on neighbouring tribes. London: Macmillan. 1921.
- The Sema Nagas. London: Macmillan. 1921.
- The Lotha Nagas: With an introduction and supplementary notes. London: Macmillan. 1922. (written by John Philip Mills, introduction and supplementary notes by Hutton)
- The Ao Nagas. London. 1926. (written by John Philip Mills, supplementary notes and bibliography by Hutton)
- Census of India. 1933.
- A Primitive Philosophy of Life: The Frazer Lecture 1938. Oxford: Clarendon Press. 1938.
- Caste in India: its Nature, Function and Origins. Cambridge: Cambridge University Press. 1946.

== See also ==
- Census of India prior to independence
