= Lucy Mair =

British anthropologist (1901-1986)

- Born: Lucy Philip Mair; 28 January 1901; UK
- Died: 1 April 1986 (aged 85); London, UK
- Occupation: Anthropologist

Lucy Philip Mair (28 January 1901 – 1 April 1986) was a British anthropologist. She wrote on the subject of social organization, and contributed to the involvement of anthropological research in governance and politics. Her work on colonial administration was influential.

== Career ==
Mair read Classics at Newnham College, Cambridge, graduating with a BA in 1923. In 1927 she joined the LSE, studying social anthropology under Bronisław Malinowski, and commenced ethnographic fieldwork in Uganda in 1931. At Malinowski's direction she spent her time in Uganda studying social change, returning to the UK in 1932 to submit her dissertation and receive her PhD. For her doctorate she did field research among the BaGanda people of Uganda, and in 1934 published her findings as An African People in the Twentieth Century, a title that encompassed her academic focus related to problems of change and development.

She began lecturing at LSE the same year. After publishing An African People in the Twentieth Century (1934), Mair received another fellowship, from the International African Institute, for a field trip in the mandated territory of North Western Tanganyika (Tanzania) for 1936–1937. During that time she was also approached to work for the Chatham House Africa Research Survey. On the eve of World War II, her teaching covered "topics all central to British colonial strategy in the context of rival empires and anti-colonial resistance." She later joined the Royal Institute for International Affairs with the outbreak of World War II.

In 1943, she moved to the Ministry of Information, then at the war's end took a job training Australian administrators for work in Papua New Guinea.

In 1946, Mair returned to LSE as reader in colonial administration, commencing a second readership (in applied anthropology) in 1952. In 1963 she became a professor, a post she held until retirement in 1968. According to one obituary, "Perhaps her best- known work in this field was on land tenure and local political organisation, which she rightly saw as factors which must be understood in detail before plans and programmes for change stand any hope of success.".

In 1964, she was made president of Section N of the British Association for the Advancement of Science. She gave the 1967 Frazer Lecture at Cambridge University.

== Works ==
Mair published books and papers throughout her life. Primitive Government, first published in 1962, discusses political patronage in relation to state formation and is cited by over 160 academic works.

=== Books ===
- The protection of minorities; The working and scope of the minorities treaties under the League of Nations, Christophers, 1928
- An African people in the twentieth century, G. Routledge and Sons, 1934
- Welfare in the British colonies, Royal Institute of International Affairs, 1944
- Australia in New Guinea, Chponeismalditosrs, 1948
- Native administration in central Nyasaland, HMSO, 1952
- Studies in applied anthropology, Athlone, 1957
- Safeguards for democracy, Oxford University Press, 1961
- Primitive government, Penguin Books, 1962
- The Nyasaland Elections of 1961, Athlone Press, 1962
- New nations, University of Chicago Press, c1963
- An introduction to social anthropology, Clarendon Press, 1965
- The new Africa, Watts, 1967
- African marriage and social change, Cass, 1969
- Anthropology and social change, Athlone, 1969
- Native policies in Africa, Negro Universities Press, 1969
- Witchcraft, Weidenfeld & Nicolson, 1969
- The Bantu of Western Kenya: with special reference to the Vugusu and Logoli, published for the International African Institute by Oxford U.P., 1970.
- Marriage, Harmondsworth, Penguin, 1971
- African societies, Cambridge University Press, 1974
- African Kingdoms, Clarendon Press, 1977
- Anthropology and Development, Macmillan, 1984

== Royal Anthropological Institute ==
Mair was throughout her working life closely involved with the Royal Anthropological Institute: after winning the RAI Wellcome medal in 1936 she was the Hon Secretary from 1974 to 1978 and the vice-president for the year 1978–79.

After her death, the RAI instituted the Lucy Mair Medal for Applied Anthropology in 1997 to commemorate her.
