= Y. Michal Bodemann =

Sociologist (1944–2025)

- Born: March 9, 1944; Allgäu, Gau Swabia, Germany
- Died: January 4, 2025 (aged 80)

Philosophical work
- Era: 21st-century philosophy
- Region: European and Western sociology
- School: Max Weber, Georg Simmel, Karl Marx, Chicago School of Sociology
- Main interests: Germans and Jews, Jewish diaspora, memory, agro-pastoral transformations in Sardinia

Y. Michal Bodemann (March 9, 1944 – January 4, 2025) was a German-born Canadian sociologist and professor at the University of Toronto, best known for his work on German Jewry, the concept of ideological labour and "memory theatre" (1991) and his contributions to sociological praxis and interventive field work, in particular, his interventive observation method in qualitative field work. In his approach to interventive observation, Bodemann advocated for the reciprocal nature of the relationship between researcher and the people in a setting, as active participation, against the notion of the passive or neutral role of the observer. Bodemann's theoretical foundation continues to be influential against positivist notions of objectivity, which still persist in the field of sociology and in the approach to qualitative methods. His methodological approach is close to that of Michael Burawoy and notions of public sociology. Bodemann is best known for his contributions to Jewish studies, and Holocaust memory, and his concept of "ideological labour": where especially ethnic minorities are cast as representing values contrasting those of the larger society. He authored and edited numerous books, newspaper and academic articles, spanning the entirety of his academic career, in English, German and Italian.

== Early life and education: 1944–1966 ==
Y. Michal Bodemann was born on March 9, 1944. His early childhood was spent in the Bavarian Alps where his father, an artist, had withdrawn as part of a community of writers and artists. Bodemann completed gymnasium in Korntal near Stuttgart. He began his studies at LMU Munich, Heidelberg University, and the University of Mannheim. In 1966, he moved to Cambridge, Massachusetts where he continued his studies in sociology and literature at Brandeis University. Bodemann completed his PhD at Brandeis University in 1979.

== PhD thesis: Telemula (1800–1980) ==
Bodemann's PhD Thesis entitled Telemula: Aspects of the micro-organization of backwardness in central Sardinia included qualitative fieldwork and methods, ethnographic participant observation, and qualitative interview-based research. The thesis explored the development of backwardness in a small village in Sardinia from 1800 until 1980. It examined how the community became geographically marginalized and how the communal subsistence economy was disrupted and destroyed on account of new forms of taxation and privatization of land as well as the ecological destruction of its natural environment, especially deforestation. Furthermore, Bodemann's dissertation focused on the rise and fall of family compacts in the community and the transformation of its kinship structures over one hundred years.

== Academic career ==
=== University of Toronto: 1974–2012 ===
In 1974, Bodemann accepted a teaching position at the University of Toronto where he taught until 2012. He was appointed to the graduate faculty in 1979 and, soon after, was promoted to associate professor followed by tenure in 1980. He was appointed to Full Professor in 1993. His teaching included classical sociological theory, and qualitative sociological methods, focusing on critically examining the praxis of sociological inquiry.

=== Teaching ===
At the graduate level, Bodemann taught Historical and Ethnographic Methods, Qualitative Methods, and, among others, Political Sociology of Germany in Contemporary Europe. At the undergraduate level, he taught numerous seminars in both North America and Europe, including Field Methods, The Jewish Community in Europe and North America, Ethnicity in Social Organization, Comparative Ethnic Relations, and Sociological Theory. Some courses in German, and in Europe included, Zu politischen Soziologie Gramscis, Marxismus und Juden "frage", and "Rasse" und Ethnizität in westlichen Gesellschaften, which covered issues of race, ethnicity, issues and topics related to the German Jewry, and political/sociological theories.

=== Academic appointments ===
Throughout his career, Bodemann positioned himself in both the North American and European sociological scene. Along with his academic appointments at the University of Toronto, he held visiting appointments at the University of Haifa and the Hebrew University of Jerusalem, Tel Aviv University, the Free University of Berlin, and the Humboldt University of Berlin. From 2008, he was director of the European Office of the University of Toronto in Berlin and was affiliated with the Joint Initiative in German and European Studies (JIGES) and the Ethnic and Pluralism Studies Program at the University of Toronto, where he was appointed to the Munk School of Global Affairs & Public Policy.

=== Professional affiliations ===
Bodemann was associate editor of "Canadian Jewish Outlook" (1979–1982) and the "Canadian Journal of Sociology" (1985–1987), and the editor of "Sardinia Newsletter" (1980–1983). Other professional affiliations and activities, from 1980 onwards, included The Insurgent Sociologist and the Critical Sociology Toronto Collective. Through the decades, his active membership and critical, often anti-positivist and methodologically radical insights, influenced many of his young contemporaries.

== Thought ==
=== German Jewry ===
In the early 1980s, Bodemann began his research on the rise of the Jewish Community in Germany after World War II. His work on the German Jewry is dominated by the question: How was it possible that, after the Holocaust and the total destruction of the German-Jewish community, a new Jewish community could develop in Germany?

Bodemann argued that this was only possible because West Germany at the time actively supported the new establishment of a Jewish community in order to signal to its Western neighbours, during the Cold War, the break with its Nazi past. This real-political manoeuvre notwithstanding, the new generations felt genuine regret and attempted to recuperate the German Jewish intellectual and cultural heritage. Bodemann also claimed that linking up to the past could only be accomplished by means of the construction of memory. In this regard, Bodemann wrote extensively on the construction of memory of Kristallnacht and its permutations over the decades after the Shoah. In particular, he argued that the date of 9 November 1938 is incorrect: the pogroms were more profuse and started in full force on 10 November, mostly not at night but during the light of day.

His book, Gedächtnistheater. Die jüdische Gemeinschaft und ihre deutsche Erfindung (Theatre of Memory. The Jewish Community and its German Invention), was listed as one of the top ten non-fiction books by the German book critics that year (1996). His book, A Jewish Family in Germany Today, a monograph about an extended Jewish family living in contemporary Germany, was published in 2005 by Duke University Press.

=== Ideological labour ===
The concept of ideological labour has its seeds in Everett Hughes's idea of a moral division of labour which is a "process by which differing moral functions are distributed among members of society, as individuals and categories of individuals" (Hughes, 1971: 289). For Bodemann, ideological labour outlines the ways in which ethnic groups perform a specific ideological function within society. In his research, he outlined how the German Jewry functioned in postwar West Germany to recapture Jewish identity and culture in Germany following the Holocaust.

Bodemann accounted for three phases in the relationship between the German Jewry, ethnicity, and the state post World War II, which show how ideological labour functioned and continues to function into the present:

1. Mediation: The first phase (after World War II – 1952) Bodemann calls "the phase of charismatic mediators" (Bodemann, 1990: 39). In this phase, diverse groups from diverse backgrounds come together in She'erit Hapletah ("saved remnant").

2. Reconsolidation: The second phase is when the process of bureaucratic reconsolidation occurs and there is an active reconstruction of Jewish life.

3. Representationism: The third phase is the phase that continues in the present, with the continued representation of Jewish life, culture and religion in public life.

== Death ==
Y. Michal Bodemann died in Germany on January 4, 2025, at the age of 80. He is survived by his four daughters and younger brother.

== Works and publications ==
Bodemann was the author of numerous articles and the editor of many books.

=== Selected books ===
- Bodemann, Y. M. (1996), Gedächtnistheater. Die jüdische Gemeinschaft und ihre deutsche Erfindung (Theatre of Memory. The Jewish Community and its German Invention). Hamburg, Rotbuch Verlag.
- Bodemann, Y. M. (1996), Jews, Germans, Memory: Reconstructions of Jewish Life in Germany. Ann Arbor, University of Michigan Press.
- Bodemann, Y. M. (2002), In den Wogen der Erinnerung. Jüdisches Leben in Deutschland. (In the tides of memory, Jewish life in Germany). Munich, DTV.
- Bodemann, Y. M. (2005), A Jewish Family in Germany Today: An Intimate Portrait. Durham, NC, Duke University Press.
- Bodemann, Y. M., ed., (2007), Citizenship and Immigrant Incorporation. Comparative Perspectives on North America and Western Europe. London – New York, Palgrave Macmillan, with Gökçe Yurdakul, eds., with an introduction by Michal Bodemann.
- Bodemann, Y. M., ed., (2008), doi:10.1057/9780230582903 The New German Jewry and the European Context. Palgrave Macmillan.
- Bodemann, Y. M., ed., (2025) Die erfundene Gemeinschaft. Erinnerungspolitik, Staat und Judentum in Deutschland. Verbrecher Verlag, with an introduction by Y. Michal Bodemann.

=== Selected articles ===
- Bodemann, Y. M. (1978) JSTOR 656992 "A Problem of Sociological Praxis. The Case for Interventive Observation in Field Work." Theory and Society, Volume 5, Issue 4 (June), Pages 387 – 420.
- Bodemann, Y. M. (1979) doi:10.1007/BF00264994 "The Fulfillment of Field Work in Marxist Praxis." Dialectical Anthropology, Volume 4, Issue March–April, Pages 155 – 161.
- Bodemann, Y. M. (1991) doi:10.1177/08969205900170030 "The State in the Construction of Ethnicity, and Ideological Labour: The Case of German Jewry." Critical Sociology, Volume 17, Issue 3, Pages 35 – 46.
- Bodemann, Y. M. (1993) doi:10.1017/S0003975600006652 "Priests, Prophets, Jews and Germans: The Political Basis of Max Weber's Conception of Ethno-national Solidarities."] Archives Européennes de Sociologie, Volume 34, Pages 224 – 247.
- Bodemann, Y. M. (1999) JSTOR 488578 "Eclipse of Memory. German Representations of Auschwitz in the post-War Period.", New German Critique, Volume 75, Pages 57 – 89.
- Bodemann, Y. M. (2005) "Geborgte Narrative: Wie sich Türkische Einwanderer an den Juden in Deutschland orientieren."JSTOR 40878623 "Borrowed narratives. How the Turkish immigrants orient themselves on the Jews in Germany.") Soziale Welt, Pages 441 – 451, (with Gökçe Yurdakul).
