= Tallensi =

A people of northern Ghana

Tallensi, also spelled Talensi, are a people of northern Ghana who speak a language of the Gur branch of the Niger-Congo language family. They grow millet and sorghum as staples and raise cattle, sheep, and goats on a small scale. Their normal domestic unit is the polygamous joint family of a man and his sons (and sometimes grandsons) with their wives and unmarried daughters. Married daughters live with their husbands in other communities, commonly nearby.

== Rituals and traditions ==
=== Surrounding the first-born son ===
The Tallensi are polygamous and follow a patrilineal system of kinship and descent. Great emphasis is placed on inheritance and the tensions surrounding parents' relationships with their children. It is considered essential for a man to have a son if he is to achieve fulfillment and be venerated as an ancestor after his death. However, the birth of a first-born son, and to a lesser extent a first-born daughter, is held to mark the culmination of a man's 'rise' in the world, and the start of his decline. Meanwhile, the son grows to replace and supplant the father. The resulting ambivalence between father and son plays an important role in Tallensi rituals and taboos.

Taboos begin when the first-born son reaches the age of five or six. From this time on the son may not eat from the same dish as his father, wear his father's cap or tunic, carry his father's quiver, use his father's bow, or look into his father's granary. When the son reaches adolescence, he may not meet his father in the entrance to the house compound. Similar taboos exist to regulate the relationship between mother and first-born daughter. The daughter, for example, may not look into her mother's storage pot.

Upon the death of a father, his first-born son and daughter lead the rituals involved in his funeral. The son, at this point, puts on his father's cap and tunic. A tribal elder, carrying the dead man's bow, ritually guides the son to his father's granary and shows him the inside. After his father's death the son is considered a mature man for the purposes of ritual, and it is his responsibility to make sacrifices to the ancestors, chief among them being his own father, who being recently dead is held to act as an intermediary between those still living and the more remote ancestors.

It is believed that these taboos and rituals serve to channel ambivalence and resentment between generations into culturally defined and culturally acceptable means of expression.

=== Sacred Crocodile ===
Among the Tallensi tribe there is a belief in the sacred crocodile. As Meyer Fortes highlighted in his ethnographic work "The concept of the person", special crocodiles in special pools are considered persons among the Tallensi. No local man, indeed no Tallensi would dare kill or injure a sacred crocodile. Every Tallensi knows that these crocodiles are the incarnation of important clan ancestors. To kill one of these is like killing a person. It is murder of the most heinous kind and it would bring disaster on the whole clan.

However, not all crocodiles are considered persons (ni-saal) for instance, in the rivers that are fished in the dry season - is not a person, not sacred. It can be killed and eaten.

== See also ==
- Tongnaab - a fertility deity of the Tallensi.
