= Emanuel Marx =

Israeli social anthropologist (1927–2022)

- עמנואל מרקס
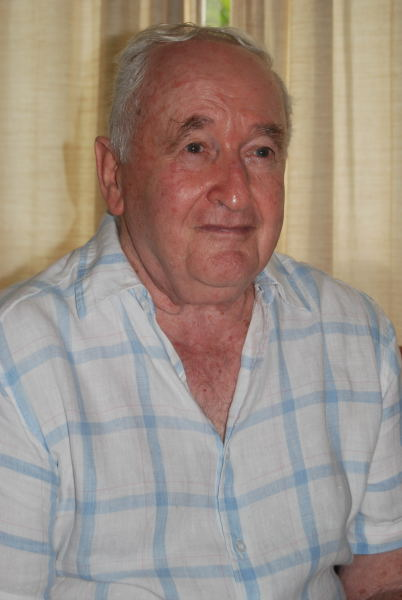
- Marx in 2008
- Born: 8 May 1927; Munich, Bavaria, Germany
- Died: 13 February 2022 (aged 94)
- Occupation: anthropologist
- Awards: Israel Prize (1998)

Academic background
- Education: Hebrew University of Jerusalem; University of Manchester
- Doctoral advisor: Emrys Peters

Academic work
- Institutions: Tel Aviv University
- Notable works: Bedouin of the Negev (1967)

Emanuel Marx (Hebrew: עמנואל מרקס; 8 May 1927 – 13 February 2022) was a German-born Israeli social anthropologist, Professor Emeritus in the Department of Sociology and Anthropology at Tel Aviv University. He was a winner of the Israel Prize in 1998 for sociological research, and was an honorary member of the British Royal Anthropological Institute.

== Biography ==
Emanuel Marx was born and raised in Munich, Germany. His paternal grandfather came to Palestine together with four brothers and sisters in 1882 and settled in Jerusalem. A few years later the grandfather and another brother returned to Germany. The extended family was religious, but the grandfather's family was already secular. His maternal grandfather came to Germany from Poland, set up a cardboard factory and was successful in his business. His father, Yitzhak, was a native of Germany and a clerk in an insurance company, while his mother, Rebecca, a native of Poland, grew up in Germany and ran a leather goods store. They had two sons, Emanuel and Shimon. Emanuel Marx attended a Jewish school in the city of Munich. In 1938, on Kristallnacht, his father was thrown into Dachau; he was released two months later. In early 1939 the parents sent the two sons as Kindertransport refugees to relatives in Manchester, England. They feared that they themselves would not be able to leave Germany. A few months later, the father was thrown back into a concentration camp, but was released in September 1939 when he received an immigration certificate to migrate to Palestine. Marx and his brother joined their parents in Palestine in January 1940. The family settled in Jerusalem, and the father fulfilled his dream and became a bookseller. Marx attended the Ma'aleh religious high school. In 1946, a year of service began as one of the Notrim in the Beit She'an Valley, where in fact he took courses with the Haganah. The day after 29 November 1947 he was drafted into active service in the Haganah, and served there and later in the IDF until the end of the war in 1949. He was in the "Moriah" battalion that took part in the battles in Jerusalem. At the end of the war he passed the IDF officers' course.

At the end of the war he began studying sociology, economics, and the modern history of the Middle East at Hebrew University, graduating with a master's degree in 1958. His prominent teachers were Martin Buber, Shmuel Noah Eisenstadt, and his favourite teacher David Ayalon. He wrote a master's thesis on the Bedouin, under the guidance of Eisenstadt. In his work he tried to connect Orientalism with sociology. For the purpose of the work he stayed for three months among the 'Azazme Bedouin in the Negev. The Bedouin became the focus of his interest over many years. During his studies he worked for a year in the regular army, then for five years as a librarian at the National Library of Israel, then from 1955 to 1959 served as an assistant to Shmuel (Ziama) Divon, the Adviser on Arab Affairs in the Prime Minister's Office. At the same time, he worked with Meir Yaakov Kister on establishing an Oriental studies strand in Israeli high schools . While researching the Negev Bedouin, Marx found that functionalist sociology in the tradition of Talcott Parsons, which he had pursued until then, did not help explain the reality he encountered, and he discovered anthropology as a scientific discipline. He finally decided to train in the field, which in those days was not taught in the country. In 1959 he won a scholarship from the British Council and went on to study for a doctorate in the Department of Social Anthropology at the University of Manchester in England, at the time the centre of the "Manchester School" of anthropology, from which he graduated in 1963. His doctoral supervisor was Professor Emrys Peters and his other teachers included Prof. Max Gluckman, Victor Turner and Bill Epstein. He did field work for a year and a half in the Abu Gwe'id tribe in the Negev. The topic of the doctorate was "Sociological analysis of kinship and corporate groups among the Bedouin in the Negev". The doctoral dissertation differed from other papers written at the time in that it incorporated the social context into sociological analysis. As a result, he realized that the "typical Bedouin lifestyle" of these tribes was nothing more than a result of the Israeli military administration imposing a blockade on them and preventing them from participating in the broader market economy.

At this time the Faculty of Social Sciences was established at Tel Aviv University, and Marx was invited to establish an anthropology department there, the first anthropologist to receive a regular academic appointment in the country. At the same time, Gluckman had negotiated generous funding from Sidney Bernstein and his family for a series of studies into the assimilation of new migrants in Israel, of which Marx was made field director, giving Marx a stream of field students to supervise, and establishing a solid basis of research associated with the new group. Marx taught at Tel Aviv University from 1964, when he was appointed a lecturer, and in 1979 he was appointed full professor. In 1995 he retired from teaching and became Professor Emeritus. In 1976, Marx established an anthropological research department at the Ben-Gurion University Desert Research Institute in Sde Boker and headed it until 1989. This unit served as a centre of attraction for researchers engaged in nomadic societies. He was a visiting professor at the universities of Manchester, Berkeley, Brandeis, Cape Town, Oxford, Aegean Islands, and Copenhagen. In 1997 he was elected an honorary member of the British Royal Anthropological Institute.

From 1989 to 1990, he served as an academic advisor to the Oxford University Refugee Research Center. From 1992 to 1995, he served as the director of the Israeli Academic Center in Cairo, a body designed to develop science relations between Egyptian and Israeli universities. In those years, among the several achievements were the opening of Egyptian libraries and research institutes, including the American University in Cairo, to researchers and students from Israel; joint studies have been conducted by researchers from the two countries; Egyptian scientists visited and lectured in Israel; Egyptian professors translated leading works from modern Hebrew literature into Arabic, and the works were first published by an Egyptian publisher; and new libraries were opened in which historic documents of the Jewish and Karaite communities in Egypt were preserved.

Marx was married to Dalia, a teacher and educational consultant, and they had three children and eight grandchildren. He died on 13 February 2022, at the age of 94.

== His research ==
=== Bedouin of the Negev ===
Marx's first book, Bedouin of the Negev, was an adaptation of his doctoral dissertation, published by the University of Manchester Press in 1967. An updated version was published in Hebrew in 1974. For this book he won the Ben Zvi Prize in 1973. Marx claimed in the book that the "closure" imposed by the military administration on the Bedouin did not serve security needs, but was intended to prevent them from entering the labour market, in order to make it easier for new Jewish immigrants to find employment. The gradual takeover of the Negev lands by the state created a class division between Bedouin landowners who were considered "real" and landless Bedouins who were considered "peasants", and each class developed its own patterns of residence and migration and ways of marriage. The tribe became a unit of government of the state, and the main function of the corporate origin-groups was to protect lands.

=== A Refugee Camp in the Mountains ===
This report was written by Marx together with the economist Professor Yoram Ben-Porat and the historian Professor Shimon Shamir. It was published in English in 1971 under the title Some Sociological and Economic Aspects of Refugee Camps on the West Bank, published by Rand in the United States. A full text of the study was published in Hebrew in 1974 by the Dayan Center at Tel Aviv University. It deals with the Palestinian refugee camps in the occupied territories, for the purpose of writing they did field work in the Jalazone refugee camp near Ramallah in 1968 and later in other camps in Gaza and the West Bank. The researchers found that the refugees were well involved in the life of the economy, that most of the camps had become suburbs of nearby towns, and that the houses in the camps gradually passed into the possession of their occupants and were sold in the free market. Hence the researchers found that a significant portion of the camp population were not refugees at all. Their main conclusion was that the refugee camps had become urban working-class neighborhoods, and that it was better to improve the living conditions in the refugee camps than striving to eliminate them. In their view, the solution to the refugee question would be found in a formalization of their ownership of their current real estate, and in the payment of fair compensation for the property lost to them, and not necessarily by their resettlement.

=== Further articles about refugees ===
Throughout his academic career, Marx has written articles on Palestinian refugees. Since the 2000s he has dealt with mostly a question of the payment of compensation to Palestinian refugees as a condition for a lasting peace settlement in the region, and with the question of the abolition of UNRWA, the United Nations Relief and Works Agency for Palestine Refugees in the Near East. In the opinion of Marx the organization did much in its early years to settle the refugees, to provide them with primary education, and to integrate them into the labour market. Over the course of its existence, the number of officials increased and the number of services provided to refugees decreased, and its work focused on education services. UNRWA is today held captive by its 24,000 officials, most of them teachers, who are preventing the transfer of its services to the Palestinian Authority.

=== The Social Context of Violent Behaviour: A Social Anthropological Study in an Israeli Immigrant Town ===
This book was published in London by Routledge in 1976 and reissued in 2004. A Hebrew translation appeared in 2015 published by Resling. The book deals with a particular type of violence that Marx calls social violence. The book was based on two years of fieldwork (1964-1966) in the Israeli development town of Ma'alot, given the name "Galilah" in the book. Marx dealt with the bureaucratic context of violence, in that bureaucracy was the cause of violence. Ma'alot had a population of new immigrants, mainly from Morocco, who were settled by the authorities where there was no employment. The government provided them with state-owned Amidar apartments, workfare jobs with the Jewish National Fund, and welfare benefits. In this way, the population became dependent on a minority of officials who provided for their basic needs. In order to obtain the resources like an apartment or greater assistance they had to apply pressure and those who had power were able to use violence. There were few cases of actual violence, mostly there were many threats that in many cases brought results.

In his book, Marx tries to deviate from the accepted theoretical paradigm that frustration causes aggression. He reviews in his book various types of violence, the most common of which is "social violence," or coercive violence. This violence is a form of force, and people use it in a calculated and controlled way, along with other types of force, to achieve an acceptable goal in his society. The main intent of the violent act is to convey a complex message, while the threat of physical harm and even actual physical harm are of secondary importance, and are primarily intended to create dramatic tension and attention. The violent accusers of virtue never harmed officials, but often their actions helped achieve what they wanted, for example a job, improved social conditions or a new apartment. The second type of violence he found in degrees is “pleading violence” of people who were in distress but did not know how to solve their problems. It was not violence towards the people who had the solution in their hands, but towards someone close, many times a family member. Sometimes salvation also grew out of this violence.

=== A Composite Portrait of Israel ===
This book, edited by Marx, which was published in 1980 by Academic Press in London, summarized a series of studies he conducted with his colleagues (including Terry Evens, Myron Aronoff, Don Handelman, Haim Hazan, Dafna Izraeli, Ruwen Ogien, and Moshe Shokeid) in the seventies. The book sketched an anthropological portrait of Israel at that time. It included a series of studies on various sites in the country, such as kibbutzim, moshavim, development towns, neighborhoods, an industrial plant and a workshop for disabled workers, and bureaucratic organizations such as the Port of Ashdod. The main purpose was not to describe in detail the community, but to identify the economics, political forces, and bureaucratic organizations and ideologies that influence it. Because these influences are mediated by representatives of the authorities and other organizations that conduct exchange relations with the community, they take on special forms at each and every site. But through the structural diversity, it is possible to identify the forces operating in the arena - those that are within the borders of the country and others that are far beyond its borders - and get a fairly true picture of the Israeli reality.

=== Life in prehistoric culture ===
In 2002, Marx participated in a Hebrew University research team, led by prehistoric researcher Naama Goren-Inbar, investigating the Paleolithic site Gesher Banot Yaakov, which was inhabited for about 100,000 years between 850 and 750 thousand years BC. In the study, Marx published one article in which he tried to recreate what early human society could have looked like at that time. He suggested that the people supported themselves by hunting and gathering. This work took about four hours a day, which left them a lot of free time to engage in cultivating social relationships. They were organized in groups of several dozen members who raised their children together and supported each other. Moving from one group to another was easy and frequent. Members of the band could bring in partners from other groups and have children with them, but since they were not needed to look after the children, they did not need to be permanent spouses. All the women could educate and breastfeed the children and all the men could take care of them. Since a large area was available to the sparse population, food was plentiful. They therefore did not claim ownership of permanent territory and could live in peace with their neighbours.

=== The Bedouin of Mount Sinai: An Anthropological Study of their Political Economy ===
This book by Emanuel Marx, published in English by Berghahn in 2013 with a Hebrew translation in 2019, is based on a field study that Marx did while in southern Sinai for varying periods of time between 1972 and 1982, during the decade of the Israeli occupation of the Sinai Peninsula and beyond. The book investigates the political economy of the Bedouin in the Mount Sinai region and considers the regional and global political and economic forces acting on the Bedouin population.

The main source of livelihood for the Bedouin during the period when Israel ruled Sinai was the labour of men who stayed for months at work far from home. This work could bring in more than just orchards and livestock, but because of the unstable political and economic conditions in the area it was subject to fluctuations and uncertainty. Marx observed upheavals in the labour markets following the Yom Kippur War and again following the peace negotiations between Egypt and Israel. He saw that the Bedouin were investing tireless efforts in building frameworks to ensure their survival, which included strict preservation of heritage, conservation of water resources, agricultural land and transit routes through tribal strengthening, conservation of orchards and herds as an economic alternative, and by stockpiling food supplies.

One chapter in the book deals with merchants from El Arish who bring all the goods needed for the Bedouin to subsist, and become an integral part of society. Without these traders the Bedouin would not have been able to survive, because it is difficult to grow grain in the prevailing conditions in southern Sinai. One chapter in the book deals with the smuggling of cannabis. It contributed about thirty percent of the Bedouin total income before Israel occupied the region, and returned to its former state after Israel left it. The cannabis travels a long way, from the growing area in Lebanon, through Jordan, Saudi Arabia and Sinai, until it reaches consumers in Egypt. Another chapter deals with the oases in the desert and shows that they were all established by people, some even in places that are difficult to settle in. For example, all the orchards on the high mountain were established with great effort, because the Bedouin were forced not only to dig wells but also to fetch the soil. They considered them a worthwhile investment because they provided them with an alternative source of livelihood, in case the possibility of working part-time work disappeared.

=== Social involvement among the Bedouin ===
Marx's involvement in Bedouin affairs in the Negev reached its peak in 1980, when the authorities decided to evacuate hundreds of Bedouin families from their land to establish a military airport in the eastern Be'er Sheva Valley. He took a year's leave from university to mediate, along with a team of planners, between the Bedouin and the authorities. The agreement reached between the parties was ratified by law; it enabled the construction of the airport and led to the establishment of two new towns, Kuseife and Ar'arat. The main importance of Marx's knowledge was that he paved the way for the recognition of the rights of the Bedouin on the agricultural lands they had cultivated for generations – albeit that the authorities' interest in the process had ground to a halt once the airport had been completed. Marx summarized his experience in this area in an article. He explained that the anthropologist could, and perhaps must, assist and advise both study subjects and planning and execution teams, but could not succeed in direct political activity on behalf of the subjects. Marx has closely followed the developments in the Bedouin cities since then. He served as a consultant to the master plan of the Bedouin city of Rahat.

== Works ==
=== English books ===
- 1967 Bedouin of the Negev. Manchester: Manchester University Press; New York: Praeger. OCLC 463009508
- 1971 Some Sociological and Economic Aspects of Refugee Camps on the West Bank, by Emanuel Marx and Yoram Ben-Porat. Santa Monica, CA: Rand. OCLC 818755
- 1976 The Social Context of Violent Behavior: A Social Anthropological Study in an Israeli Immigrant Town. London: Routledge and Kegan Paul. Reissued 2004, Routledge Library Editions. London: Routledge. ISBN 071008420X
- 1980 A Composite Portrait of Israel, ed. Emanuel Marx. London: Academic Press. ISBN 0124764509
- 1984 The Changing Bedouin, eds Emanuel Marx and Avshalom Shmueli. New Brunswick, NJ: Transaction. ISBN 0878554920
- 1990 The Bedouin of Cyrenaica: Studies in Personal and Corporate Power, by Emrys L. Peters, eds Jack Goody and Emanuel Marx. Cambridge: Cambridge University Press. ISBN 0511598351
- 2001 Employment and Unemployment among Bedouin, ed. Emanuel Marx. Oxford: Berghahn (Special issue of Nomadic Peoples, 4 (2).
- 2010 Perspectives on Israeli Anthropology, edited by Orit Abuhav, Esther Hertzog, Harvey E. Goldberg, and Emanuel Marx. Detroit: Wayne State University Press. ISBN 0814330509
- 2013 Bedouin of Mount Sinai: An Anthropological Study of their Political Economy. New York: Berghahn ISBN 0857459325
- 2020 State Violence in Nazi Germany: From Kristallnacht to Barbarossa. Routledge. ISBN 0367409852

=== Hebrew books ===
- 1974 The Bedouin society in the Negev (החברה הבדוית בנגב). Tel Aviv: Reshafim. OCLC 67201090 Updated translation of English 1967 book
- 1974 A Refugee Camp in the Mountains (מחנה פליטים בגב־ההר), by Yoram Ben-Porat, Emanuel Marx, and Shimon Shamir. Tel Aviv: Shiloah Institute, Tel Aviv University. OCLC 35190904 Translation of English 1971 report.
- 1980 Chapters in Social Anthropology (פרקים באנתרופולוגיה חברתית), edited by Moshe Shokeid, Emanuel Marx, and Shlomo Deshen. Tel Aviv: Schocken Publishing. OCLC 233383259
- 1998 Israel: Local Anthropology (ישראל: אנתרופולוגיה מקומית), edited by Orit Abuhav, Esther Hertzog, Harvey E. Goldberg, and Emanuel Marx. Tel Aviv: Tcherikover. OCLC 174365918
- 2015 The social context of violent behavior: An anthropological-social study of an immigrant town in Israel (ההקשר החברתי של התנהגות אלימה: מחקר אנתרופולוגי-חברתי על עיירת עולים בישראל). Translation: Tami Elon-Ortal, Tel Aviv: Resling. Translation of English 1976 book
- 2019 The Bedouin at Mount Sinai: An Anthropological Study of Political Economy (הבדווים בהר סיני: מחקר אנתרופולוגי של הכלכלה הפוליטית). Translation: Tami Elon-Ortal. Tel Aviv: Resling. Translation of English 2013 book.

=== Festschrift in his honour ===
- Haim Hazan & Esther Hertzog (eds). Serendipity in Anthropological Research: The Nomadic Turn . xix + 332 p. Farnham, Ashgate Publishing, 2012. ISBN 1409430588

=== Selected articles ===
- 1972 "Some Social Contexts of Personal Violence". In The Allocation of Responsibility, ed. Max Gluckman. Manchester: Manchester University Press. ISBN 0719004918 pp. 281-321.
- 1973 "Circumcision Feasts among the Negev Bedouins". International Journal of Middle East Studies 4 (4): 411–427. JSTOR 162312
- 1977 "The Tribe as a Unit of Subsistence". American Anthropologist 79 (2): 343–363. doi:10.1525/aa.1977.79.2.02a00090
- 1980 "On the Anthropological Study of Nations". In A Composite Portrait of Israel, ed. Emanuel Marx. London: Academic Press. ISBN 0124764509, pp. 15–28.
- 1980 "Wage Labor and Tribal Economy of the Bedouin in South Sinai". In When Nomads Settle: Processes of Sedentarization as Adaptation and Response, ed. Philip C. Salzman. New York: Bergin. ISBN 0030525012, pp. 111–123.
- 1987 "Relations between Spouses among Negev Bedouin". Ethnos 52 (1-2): 156–179. doi:10.1080/00141844.1987.9981340
- 1987 "Labor Migrants with a Secure Base: Bedouin of South Sinai". In Migrants, Workers and the Social Order, ed. Jeremy S. Eades. London: Tavistock (ASA Monograph 26). ISBN 042261680X, pp. 148–164.
- 1990 "The Social World of Refugees: A Conceptual Framework" (Colson lecture). Journal of Refugee Studies 3 (3): 189–203. doi:10.1093/jrs/3.3.189
- 1992 "Palestinian Refugee Camps in the West Bank and the Gaza Strip". Middle Eastern Studies 28 (2): 281–294. doi:10.1080/00263209208700901 JSTOR 4283493
- 1996 "Are there Pastoral Nomads in the Arab Middle East?" In The Anthropology of Tribal and Peasant Pastoral Societies, eds Ugo Fabietti and Philip C. Salzman. Pavia: Collegio Ghislieri; Como: Ibis. ISBN 8871640535, pp. 101–115. (Italian translation by Ugo Fabietti, pp. 116–128).
- 1996 "Suq al-sharq al-awsat; man yaksab minha?" (Who stands to gain from a Middle Eastern Market?). In Al-sharq awsatiyah, ed. Salama Ahmad Salama. Cairo: Ahram Press, pp. 93–101.
- 2001 "Land and Work: Negev Bedouin Struggle with Israeli Bureaucracies". Nomadic Peoples 4 (2): 106–121. JSTOR 43123609
- 2001 "Refugee Compensation: Why the Parties have been Unable to Agree and Why it is Important to Compensate Refugees for Losses". In The Palestinian Refugees: Old Problems - New Solutions, eds. Joseph Ginat and Edward J. Perkins. Norman: University of Oklahoma Press, ISBN 0806133937 pp. 102-108.
- 2004 "Dilemmas of Prolonged Humanitarian Aid Operations: The Case of UNRWA (UN Relief and Work Agency for the Palestinian Refugees)", by Emanuel Marx and Nitza Nachmias. Journal for Humanitarian Assistance, posted 22 June 2004
- 2005 "Land, Towns and Planning: The Negev Bedouin and the State of Israel ", by Emanuel Marx and Avinoam Meir. Geography Research Forum 25: 43–61.
- 2005 "Nomads and Cities: The Development of a Conception". In Shifts and Drifts in Nomad-Sedentary Relations, eds Stefan Leder and Bernhard Streck. Wiesbaden: Ludwig Reichert, pp. 3–15. ISBN 3895004138. Cf also pp 31-46 in Hazan & Hertzog (2012)
- 2006 "The Political Economy of Middle Eastern and North African Pastoral Nomads". In Nomadic Societies in the Middle East and North Africa: Entering the 21st Century, ed. Dawn Chatty. Leiden: Brill, pp. 78–97. doi:10.1163/9789047417750_005
