= Department of Social Anthropology, University of Manchester =

Department of Social Anthropology at the University of Manchester

The Department of Social Anthropology at the University of Manchester, founded by Max Gluckman in 1947 became known among anthropologists and other social scientists as the Manchester School. Notable features of the Manchester School included an emphasis on "case studies", deriving from Gluckman's early training in law and similar to methods used in law schools. The case method involved detailed analysis of particular instances of social interaction to infer rules and assumptions. The Manchester School also read the works of Marx and other economists and sociologists and looked at issues of social justice such as apartheid and class conflict. Recurring themes included issues of conflict and reconciliation in small-scale societies and organizations, and the tension between individual agency and social structure.

Manchester school members and interlocutors also played major roles in the development of the field of Social Networks in anthropology and the social sciences. John Barnes, Elizabeth Bott, and J. Clyde Mitchell were all associated with Gluckman's department.

Several anthropologists who were not directly associated with the Manchester University anthropology department are sometimes considered members of the Manchester School, particularly those who were associated with Gluckman or his students through the Rhodes-Livingstone Institute. Some others, such as Edmund Leach, at one period or another were significant interlocutors of the Manchester School.

An alternative adjectival form for the Manchester School is "Mancunian" (like Cantabrigian for the University of Cambridge).

== Notable Manchester School anthropologists ==
- Max Gluckman
- F. G. Bailey – student of Gluckman
- John Arundel Barnes – worked at Rhodes-Livingstone Institute with Gluckman, student of Gluckman
- Fredrik Barth – student of Leach (see [2])
- Elizabeth Bott
- Abner Cohen – student of Gluckman
- Elizabeth Colson – through Rhodes-Livingstone Institute talk of Elizabeth Colson and interview by Alan Macfarlane: and after-dinner talk on the history of anthropology
- A. L. Epstein — worked at Rhodes-Livingstone Institute
- T. Scarlett Epstein
- Ronald Frankenberg – student of Gluckman
- Bruce Kapferer – student of Gluckman
- Norman Long – PhD student, later lecturer until 1972
- J. Clyde Mitchell – early researcher at Rhodes-Livingstone Institute
- Thayer Scudder – worked at Rhodes-Livingstone Institute
- Victor Turner – worked at Rhodes-Livingstone Institute, student of Gluckman (see [2])
- Jaap van Velsen — worked at Rhodes-Livingstone Institute with Gluckman (see [3])
- Richard Werbner — student of Gluckman

=== Social scientists sometimes associated with the Manchester School ===
- Edmund Leach – though not educated at Manchester, he was a major interlocutor of the Manchester School, especially in his early years. In later years, he engaged more directly with issues arising out of the French Structuralism of Claude Lévi-Strauss.
- Maurice Godelier – not educated at Manchester, his work, along with that of Marshall Sahlins, Claude Meillassoux, and Emmanuel Terray, was widely read in Leach's Cambridge seminars (and at Manchester), as reported by Tim Ingold.
- Douglas White – not educated at Manchester, he collaborated with J. Clyde Mitchell, Elizabeth Colson, Thayer Scudder, and developed an anthropological approach to Social Networks that built on Manchester School work of Elizabeth Bott, Victor Turner, J. Clyde Mitchell, John Arundel Barnes, Fredrik Barth and Bonno Thoden van Velzen; his PhD advisor, legal anthropologist E. Adamson Hoebel, was a close friend with Gluckman, who often visited Hoebel in Minneapolis.

== Sources ==
- "Manchester School".
