= Bruce Kapferer =

Australian anthropologist (born 1940)

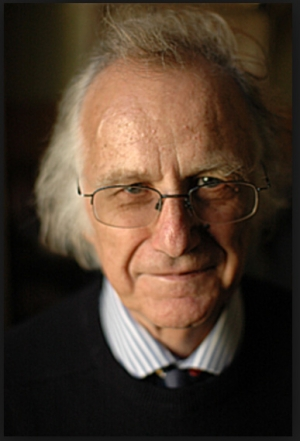
Kapferer in December 2011; photo by Kim E. Andreassen

Bruce Kapferer (born 4 June 1940 in Sydney) is an Australian anthropologist. He is best known for his work on Sri Lanka, Australia and Zambia. He has been at the forefront of anthropological debate for over three decades. He was honoured with Huxley Prize in 2011 by the Royal Anthropological Institute of Great Britain.

== Biography ==
Kapferer studied at the University of Sydney and later for the Ph.D. at the University of Manchester. He became part of the famous Manchester School of Anthropology working with Max Gluckman, Victor Turner, Bill Epstein, Elizabeth Colson and J. Clyde Mitchell.

His early fieldwork was in Zambia where he researched among the Bisa of Lake Bangweulu and among mine and commercial workers in the town of Kabwe. His work from Zambia contributed to an analytical tradition of exchange theory but with a structuralist orientation. Working under Clyde Mitchell, he became an early pioneer of social network analysis. But later, following extensive fieldwork in Sri Lanka, he shifted his focus to ritual demonstrating the importance of the phenomenology of aesthetics to the analysis of ritual performance. He has since extended this interest to the interpretation of nationalism and its violence.

His interest on nationalism was slowly linked then to research on the transformations of state structures that reproduce inequality, poverty, and violence. Much of Kapferer's theoretical interventions comes from his articles mostly appeared in Social Analysis, the journal he founded in 1976 in collaboration with Kingsley Garbett and Michael Roberts.

Some of the most noted articles are The Star Wars (2000), Retreat of the Social (2004), Anthropology And the Dialectic of Enlightenment (2007), and in the Event (2010). He was one of the editors of Anthropological Theory (until 2014) and remains on the Board. Kapferer established two anthropology departments in Australia (at the University of Adelaide and at James Cook University). He was also instrumental in the foundation of the Cairns Institute. Kapferer has also held professorial posts in anthropology at University College London (where he is now an Honorary Professorial Fellow) and at the University of Bergen, where he is currently emeritus and the Director of 'Egalitarianism' research program.

== Selected works ==
- A Celebration of Demons, Bloomington: Indiana University Press. Second Edition 1991 (Berg Publishers). 1983
- Legends of people and Myths of State, Washington: Smithsonian Institution Press, 1988.
- The Feast of The Sorcerer, Chicago: University of Chicago Press, 1997.
- 2001 and Counting: Kubrick, Nietzsche, and anthropology. Chicago: Prickly Paradigm Press, 2014
- Transaction and Meaning in an African Factory, Manchester: Manchester University Press, 1972.

== Quotes ==
I think many introductory anthropology courses have got it wrong with going from simple to complex. I have hardened up on this position after reading Richard Feynman and his recipe of teaching physics. He insisted that young students are at the height of their brain power full of intellectual capacity. They can immediately handle difficult ideas and are thirsty for them. These can be presented without the confusions of disciplinary jargon which, while necessary, can be gradually presented to them through the fun of difficult ideas.
