= Mary Gluckman =

British linguist, adult educator, and activist

- Memorial plaque in Hyning Scout Wood
- Born: 1917; Italy
- Died: 1990 (aged 72–73); Birmingham
- Education: Wycombe Abbey; Oxford University
- Spouse: Max Gluckman
- Scientific career
- Fields: Linguist and adult educator
- Workplaces: Freelance for e.g. Movement for Colonial Freedom; worked for V.S.O. in Sierra Leone,

Mary Gluckman (1917–1990) was a British linguist, adult educator, and political activist, in particular opposing British colonialism in Africa. She was the wife of Professor Max Gluckman at Manchester University and worked at her husband's side for many years.

== Early life ==
She was born in Rome in 1917, and as a result grew up bilingual in Italian and English. Her father, an Italian architect, died before Mary was born; her mother, an English actress resident in Rome, died when Mary was two years old. As a result, she was brought up by relatives of her mother, a well-to-do family. Mary attended a girl's boarding school, Wycombe Abbey, before going on to study languages at Oxford University. But on New Year's Eve, 1938 she met her future husband Max while on a skiing holiday in the French Alps. After they married, she dropped out of Oxford and travelled to Southern Africa to help him with his field work among the Zulu and later the Barotse.

== Life in Africa ==
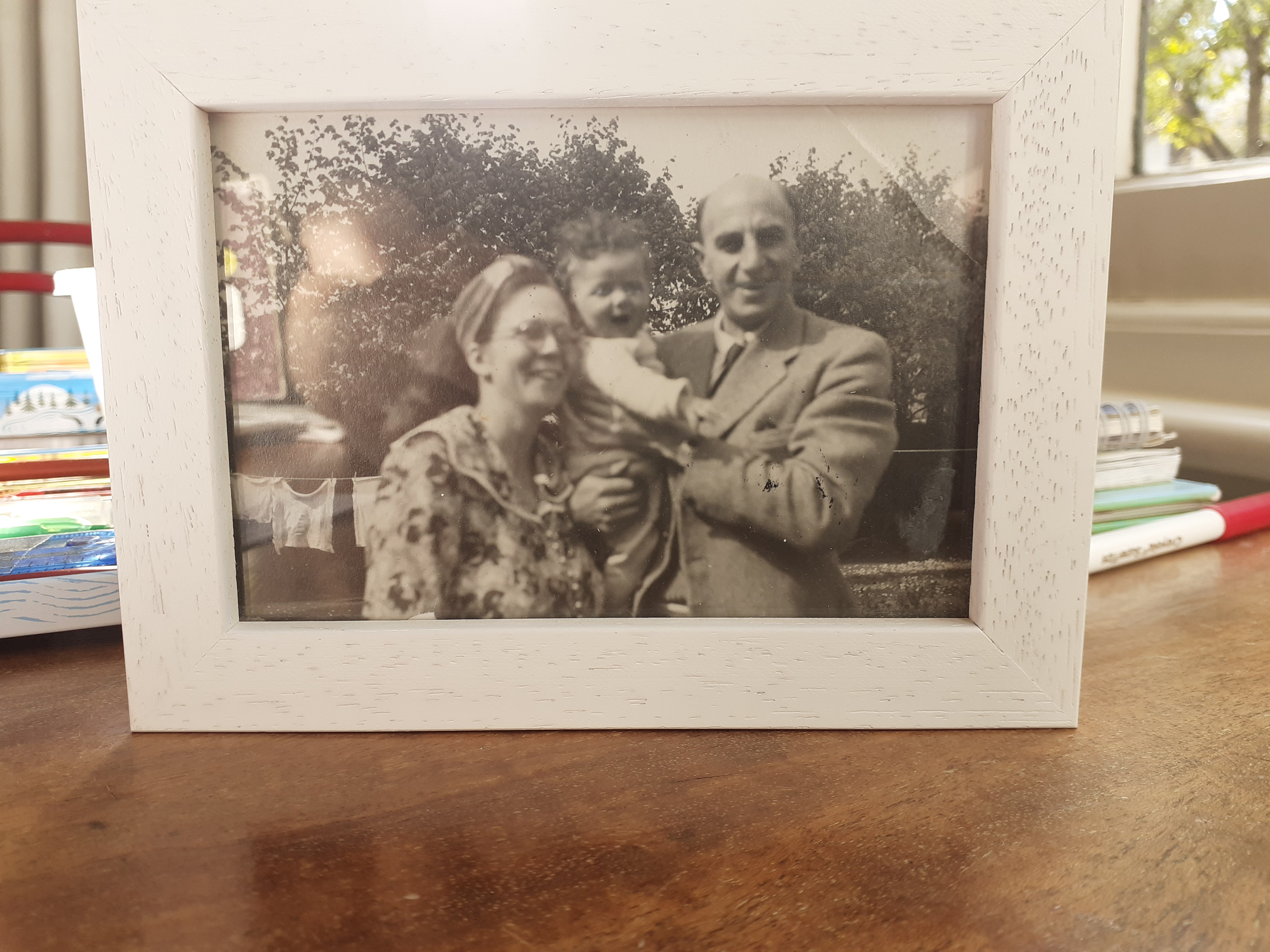
Mary and Max Gluckman with 3rd son, Tim in 1951

The Gluckman's first son, John, was born on March 12, 1943, in Cape Town. Some of the conflicts of family life and being the wife of a social anthropologist are shown in Lyn Schumaker's account which states that Mary became involved in the work of the Rhodes-Livingstone Institute in what was then Northern Rhodesia, now Zambia. (RLI). This period of Mary's life is covered in some detail by Professor Robert Gordon's biography.

== Life in England after her return from Africa ==
Mary was politically active throughout her adult life. What she had seen of racism in South Africa and Colonialism throughout Southern Africa motivated her to engage in movements struggling against Britain's colonial hegemony. Max and Mary were genuinely hospitable: between the early 1950s and early 1960s their overnight visitors included Kenneth Kaunda and Julius Nyerere later to become African Presidents, two men who later became V-Ps, two (later) chief ministers and a dozen cabinet ministers. (Robert Gordon. p. 390).

Mary took an active part in the field of community work in the severely disadvantaged Moss Side area of Manchester. She facilitated the placing of a Sierra Leonian social anthropologist, Eyo Bassey Ndem, in a large community project funded by Sir Arthur Lewis. In November 1963, Mary was involved in an incident that attracted widespread interest in England's national media: for example the Birmingham Daily Post reported (18.11.1963), 'SAFE AFTER NIGHT ON MT. KENYA After spending a night in a collapsed condition near the summit of Mount Kenya, Mrs. Mary Gluckman, aged 46....was found safe. Rescue parties had struggled up the mountain in rain, snow and heavy mud ...' she was hospitalised in a Kenyan hospital but made a full recovery from hepatitis which had caused her collapse. (https://www.britishnewspaperarchive.co.uk/search/results?basicsearch=%22mary%20gluckman%22&retrievecountrycounts=false) Mary's life may have been saved by Alastair, son of Eugenie Cheesmond (see below) who ran down Mount Kenya (5,199m.) to fetch mountain rescue help.

In the mid-1960s, Mary's maternal role(s) almost fulfilled, she returned to her studies, obtaining a First at Manchester University in Modern Languages, and then an M.A. there. Mary along with psychiatrist Dr Eugenie Cheesmond, worked on the founding of the Lifeline Project from 1970-1972, for instance raising money. Until Lifeline, there had been almost no agencies tackling challenges of drug abuse in Manchester and North West England. She became its secretary, and de facto spokesperson.

After Max's death in 1975, Mary worked for VSO over two years on literacy projects in Bo, Sierra Leone. She had been required to obtain a certificate in the type of work she would be doing in adult literacy. While there, on a few occasions she and other members of the expatriate community in Bo had (literally) to lie low during state violence to avoid ricochets or loose cannons; (according to her letters from Sierra Leone, in the Mary Gluckman archive at the RAI).

After her return from West Africa (in late 1978), in the 1980s she worked as a volunteer in the Manchester head office of a small trade-union representing youth workers. That contact came about through her friendship with Ms Sandra Leventon who ran that office. In fact, the wide range of her political activities is shown by the archive of her life which was donated in 2023 to the Royal Anthropological Institute of Great Britain and Ireland (RAI).

Unlike Max Gluckman who was a pioneer in the sociology of sport e.g. giving talks on BBC Home Service (forerunner of BBC R4) about football crowds, Mary was not interested in sport. Nevertheless, she kept fit by rambling, for example, in the Peak District.

== Publications ==
- Mary and Max Gluckman (1977), "On Drama, and Games and Athletic Contests", Secular Ritual, Uitgeverij Van Gorcum, ISBN 9023214579
