= Votebank =

Type of voting block on ethnic or identity lines

A votebank (also spelled vote-bank or vote bank), in the political discourse of India, is a loyal bloc of voters from a single community, who consistently back a certain candidate or political formation in democratic elections. Such behavior is often the result of an expectation of benefits, whether real or imagined, from the political formations, often at the cost of other communities. Votebank politics is the practice of creating and maintaining votebank through divisive policies. As it encourages voting on the basis of self-interest of certain groups, often against their better judgement, it is considered harmful to the principles of the representative democracy. Here, community may be of a caste, religion, language, or subnation.

== Etymology ==
The term was first used by noted Indian sociologist, M. N. Srinivas in his 1955 paper entitled The Social System of a Mysore Village. He used it in the context of political influence exerted by a patron over a client. Later, the expression was used by F. G. Bailey, a professor of anthropology at the University of California, San Diego, in his 1959 book Politics and Social Change, to refer to the electoral influence of the caste leader. This is the usage that has since become popular.

== Examples ==
Some of the first identified votebanks were along caste lines. Others based on other community characteristics, such as religion and language, have also occurred. Votebanks are generally considered undesirable in electoral politics. For example, Thapar (2013) argues that votebanks based on either caste or religion stand in the way of secularisation. Katju (2011) identifies accusations of votebanking as a rhetorical tool used by Hindu nationalists in complaints about special rights or privileges granted to non-Hindus in India. Other examples include:

- In 1989, the Badaga people of South India petitioned the Indian government to be recognized as an official tribe, demonstrating en masse on 15 May of that year to imply the strength of the Badaga votebank.
- In 1985, Rajiv Gandhi acted against the Shah Bano judgement under influence of Muslim conservatives.

== Remedy ==
Some argue that votebank practices can be mitigated by limiting the provisions of the Tenth Schedule of the Indian Constitution to a few critical issues.

== See also ==
- Clientelism
- Ethnic party
- Identity politics
- Political particularism
- Ethnocultural politics in the United States
- Secular National Dravida Party

== Bibliography ==
- Bailey, F. G. (1959), Politics and Social Change, Berkeley: University of California Press
- Basu, Partha (2007), ""Brand Buddha" in India's West Bengal: The Left Reinvents Itself", Asian Survey, 47 (2): 288–306, doi:10.1525/as.2007.47.2.288
- Grillo, Ralph; Needham, Rodney (2000), "Obituary: M. N. Srinivas", Anthropology Today, 16 (1): 22, doi:10.1111/1467-8322.00007, ISSN 0268-540X, JSTOR 2678199
- Heidemann, Frank (2014), "Objectification and Social Aesthetics: Memoranda and the Celebration of "Badaga Day"", Asian Ethnology, 73 (1/2): 91–109, doi:10.18874/ae.73.1-2.06 (inactive 2 July 2025)
- Katju, Manjari (2011), "The Understanding of Freedom in Hindutva", Social Scientist, 39 (3/4): 3–22
- Srinivas, M. N. (1955), "The Social System of a Mysore Village", in Marriott, McKim (ed.), Village India: studies in the little community, Chicago: University of Chicago Press, pp. 1–35
- Thapar, Romila (2013), "The Secular Mode for India", Social Scientist, 41 (11/12): 3–10
