= Godfrey Wilson =

British anthropologist (1908–1944)

- Born: 1908
- Died: May 19, 1944
- Education: Hertford College, Oxford, London School of Economics and Political Science
- Spouse: Monica Wilson
- Children: Francis Wilson
- Scientific career
- Fields: anthropologist
- Doctoral advisor: Bronisław Malinowski

Godfrey Wilson (1908 – 19 May 1944) was a British anthropologist who studied social change in Africa.

Wilson first joined Hertford College with an open scholarship in 1927, and received a Lit. Hum. degree in 1931. In 1932, he entered the London School of Economics and Political Science. Wilson studied anthropology under Bronisław Malinowski in a program for the International African Institute, doing co-ordinated research in various African territories. Wilson took an active role in assisting in Malinowski's seminars. Wilson's research was focused largely on Malinowski's areas of study at the time of acculturation. He left the programme in 1934, leaving for Tanganyika where he did work with the Nyakyusa-Ngonde people. He married Monica Hunter in 1935. She was a fellow anthropologist who had been conducting field research on the Pondo. By 1936, the two began to work together in their studies, by then living in Livingstone.

He was appointed as the first director of the Rhodes-Livingstone Institute in Northern Rhodesia in May 1938, having been recommended by Hailey and Lugard. The institute was the first organisation situated in an African colony to carry out anthropological research. Wilson worked with his wife to analyse the rapid economic and social changes that were occurring in the British colonies of Northern Rhodesia, Tanganyika Territory, and Nyasaland. They focused mainly on urban societies and mining towns along the copperbelt. He was particularly interested in the effects of industrialisation on less advanced cultures. His "Essay on the Economics of Detribalization in Northern Rhodesia" and their book, The Analysis of Social Change (1945), is based on this work. Wilson worked for the academic independence of the institute, but as he became more involved in his research, he came into conflict with the mining companies. Wilson became an outspoken critic of the mining companies and refused to tone down his work to support official views. His permission to study the workers was withdrawn after a strike in which many were killed. His active opposition to the war led to his resignation as director. He was replaced by Max Gluckman.

Wilson left the institute in 1942, and went on to join the South African Medical Corps, where he served in North Africa. He was commissioned as an information officer in November 1943. He committed suicide while on active service in 1945 as Lieutenant with the South African Engineer Corps aged 35 and is buried at Thaba Tshwane (New) Military Cemetery. He was survived by his parents in Edinburgh, as well as his wife and two children in South Africa.
