= T. Scarlett Epstein =

British-Austrian social anthropologist, economist (1922–2014)

Trude Scarlett Epstein
- Born: Trude Grünwald; 13 July 1922; Vienna-Brigittenau, Austria
- Died: 27 April 2014 (aged 91)
- Education: University of Manchester
- Occupations: Social anthropologist, economist
- Spouse: Bill Epstein

Trude Scarlett Epstein OBE (1922 – 2014), née Grünwald, was a British-Austrian social anthropologist and economist, and a member of the "Manchester School" of anthropology.

== Life and work ==
Trude Grünwald, born 13 July 1922 in Vienna to a Jewish family, she was the daughter of the travelling salesman Siegfried Grünwald and Rosa Grünwald. She had two brothers and grew up in the Karl-Marx-Hof housing complex. She was a student at the Glasergasse high school in the ninth district in 1938, when she and her family became refugees following the Nazi annexation of Austria. She has described how "she and all the other Jewish students had been chased out of school in 1938 amid great jeering."

In July 1938, she travelled first to Zagreb, Croatia with her mother (her two brothers had already arrived in London, England). Then in September 1938 they moved to Durrës in Albania, and in April 1939 to London. There she found work taking a variety of jobs, and she began her university studies: economics and political science in Oxford and development economics and anthropology in Manchester. She completed a PhD in economics under the supervision of social anthropologist Max Gluckman, the founder of the "Manchester School". Described as one of the "pioneers" of development studies, her work focused in particular on rural economies and women's activities, and drew on fieldwork in Karnataka, India and Papua New Guinea.

According to an obituary, Epstein became "one of the world's most recognized social anthropologists and taught at various universities in England, Australia, the USA, Israel, Papua New Guinea and India". Her final residence was in Hove, England.

She died on April 27, 2014 at the age of 92.

== Private life ==
She was married to social anthropologist Arnold Bill Epstein, another member of the "Manchester School", and they had two daughters.

== Selected bibliography ==
- Epstein, T. Scarlett (2005). Swimming Upstream: A Jewish Refugee from Vienna. London: Vallentine Mitchell. ISBN 978-0853036067.
