= John Arundel Barnes =

Australian and British anthropologist

John Arundel Barnes FBA (9 September 1918 – 13 September 2010) was an Australian and British social anthropologist. Until his death in 2010, Barnes held the post of Emeritus Professor of Sociology, Fellow of Churchill College. From 1969 to 1982, he held the post of Professor of Sociology at the University of Cambridge. Previous positions include faculty posts in social anthropology at the University of Sydney and the Australian National University in Canberra, He also was associated with Academy of the Social Sciences in Australia, University College London, St John's College, Cambridge, Balliol College, Oxford and the Rhodes-Livingstone Institute. Barnes was a student of Max Gluckman in the Manchester School.

== Academic work ==
John A. Barnes, among others, is known to be the first to use the concept of social networks in a scientific context. This was in 1954, in the article "Class and Committees in a Norwegian Island Parish", in which he presented the result of nearly two years of fieldwork in Bremnes on the island of Bømlo, Norway. His anthropological studies ranged from New Guinea to Norway. His interests and writings extended across the social and political sciences and beyond.

Barnes was offered a fellowship at Churchill College, Cambridge by Dick Tizard.

== Publications ==
Known publication titles include:

- The frequency of divorce (1964)
- Three Styles in the Study of Kinship (1971) ISBN 9780520018792
- Marriage in a Changing Society (1951) ASIN B001V8AKLE
- Models and interpretations
- Politics in a changing society: A political history of Fort Jameson Ngoni (1954)
- The Ethics of Inquiry in Social Science: Three Lectures (1977) ISBN 9780195607673
- Sociology in Cambridge (1970) ISBN 978-0521081207
- A Pack of Lies: Towards a Sociology of Lying (1994) ISBN 9780521459785
- Who Should Know What? Social Science, Privacy, and Ethics (1979) ISBN 9780140803716
- Kinship Studies: Some Impressions of the Current State of Play
- Anthropology after Freud
- Social Networks (1972)
- Inquest on the Murngin (1967) (Royal Anthropological Institute. Occasional papers, no.26)
- African models in the New Guinea Highlands (1962)
- Humping on my drum (autobiography) ISBN 978-1409204008
