= Royal Anthropological Institute of Great Britain and Ireland =

Anthropological organisation and learned society in the United Kingdom

- Founded: 1871; 155 years ago
- Type: Charitable organisation
- Registration no.: England and Wales: 246269
- Location: London, W1
- Coordinates: 51.523786°N 0.139802°W
- President: Jonathan Spencer
- Website: www.therai.org.uk

The Royal Anthropological Institute of Great Britain and Ireland (RAI) is a long-established anthropological organisation, and Learned Society, with a global membership. Its remit includes all the component fields of anthropology, such as biological anthropology, evolutionary anthropology, social anthropology, cultural anthropology, visual anthropology and medical anthropology, as well as sub-specialisms within these, and interests shared with neighbouring disciplines such as human genetics, archaeology and linguistics. It seeks to combine a tradition of scholarship with services to anthropologists, including students.

The RAI promotes the public understanding of anthropology, as well as the contribution anthropology can make to public affairs and social issues. It includes within its constituency not only academic anthropologists, but also those with a general interest in the subject, and those trained in anthropology who work in other fields.

== History ==
The institute's fellows are lineal successors to the founding fellows of the Ethnological Society of London, who in February 1843 formed a breakaway group of the Aborigines' Protection Society, which had been founded in 1837. The new society was to be 'a centre and depository for the collection and systematisation of all observations made on human races'.

Between 1863 and 1870 there were two organisations, the Ethnological Society and the Anthropological Society. The Anthropological Institute of Great Britain and Ireland (1871) was the result of a merger between these two rival bodies. Permission to add the word Royal was granted in 1907. On 16th October 2020 the Institute was granted a Royal Charter. The Institute has a Royal Patron in the person of HRH The Duke of Gloucester KG, GCVO.

== Publications ==
The Institute publishes three journals:

Journal of the Royal Anthropological Institute, formerly Man, is a quarterly journal with articles on all aspects of anthropology, as well as correspondence and a section of book reviews. The Journal provides an important forum for 'anthropology as a whole', embracing social anthropology, archaeology, biological anthropology and the study of material culture. A Special (fifth) issue was inaugurated in 2006. The Special Issue appears annually, is guest-edited or single-authored, and addresses different themes in anthropology from year to year.

Anthropology Today is a bimonthly publication aiming to provide a forum for the application of anthropological analysis to public and topical issues, while reflecting the breadth of interests within the discipline of anthropology. It is committed to promoting debate at the interface between anthropology and areas of applied knowledge such as education, medicine and development; as well as that between anthropology and other academic disciplines.

Anthropological Index Online was launched in 1997. The Index is an online bibliographic service for researchers, teachers and students of anthropology worldwide. Access is free to individual users; institutional users (except those in developing countries) pay an annual subscription. Major European and other languages of scholarship are covered, and new material is added on a continuing basis.

The Indian Antiquary was published under the authority of the Council of the Royal Anthropological Institute from 1925 to 1932.

== RAI collection ==
The RAI has a reference and research collection comprising photos, films, archives and manuscripts.

The photographic library consists of over 75,000 historic prints, negatives, lantern-slides and other images, the earliest dating from the 1860s. The photo library illustrates the great diversity and vitality of the world's cultures as well as the history of photographic image-making itself.

The RAI is actively involved in developing ethnographic film and video, as a mode of anthropological enquiry and as an educational resource. It has an extensive collection of videos, copies of which are available for sale for educational and academic purposes. Films can be studied and previewed onsite.

The archive and manuscript collection spans a period of over 150 years, providing a unique historical record of the discipline and of the Institute itself. Much unpublished textual and visual material entrusted to the RAI over the years is held in the manuscript collection, which is being conserved and catalogued on a continuing basis.

Access to the RAI Collection is free to all RAI Fellows, Members, Student Associates and all undergraduate students by prior appointment. Others may visit the Collection on payment of an access fee.

The RAI has a close association with the British Museum's Anthropology Library, which incorporates the former RAI Library given to the Museum in 1976. The Library is located within the Centre for Anthropology at the British Museum, and is effectively Britain's national anthropological library. All may use the Library on site; RAI Fellows may borrow books acquired by the RAI.

== Awards ==
=== Huxley Memorial Medal ===
The Huxley Memorial Medal and Lecture was established in 1900 in memory of Thomas Henry Huxley to identify and acknowledge the work of scientists, British or foreign, distinguished in any field of anthropological research. The highest honour awarded by the Royal Anthropological Institute, it is awarded annually by ballot of the council. The recipient delivers a lecture that is usually published.

=== Rivers Memorial Medal ===
The Medal was founded in 1923 by the Council of the Institute in memory of its late President, William Halse Rivers, originally for 'anthropological work in the field'. However, in the 1960s the rules were amended to reflect anthropological work in a broader sense. The Medal shall be awarded for a recent body of work published over a period of five years which makes, as a whole, a significant contribution to social, physical or cultural anthropology or archaeology. Recipients include:

- 1924 A. C. Haddon
- 1925 C. G. Seligman
- 1926 Edward Westermarck
- 1927 Sir W. Baldwin Spencer
- 1928 Sidney H. Ray and Emil Torday
- 1929 John Henry Hutton
- 1930 Bronislaw Malinowski
- 1931 Reverend E. W. Smith
- 1932 Melville Williams Hilton
- 1933 Brenda Seligman
- 1934 Gertrude Caton-Thompson
- 1935 A. M. Hocart
- 1936 Peter H. Buck
- 1937 Edward Evan Evans-Pritchard
- 1938 Dorothy Ann Elizabeth Garrod
- 1939 Isaac Schapera
- 1940 Raymond Firth
- 1941 Diamon Jenness
- 1942 James Philip Mills
- 1943 Beatrice Mary Blackwood
- 1944 James Hornell
- 1945 J. Eric Thompson and Audrey I. Richards
- 1946 Ian H. Hogbin
- 1947 Meyer Fortes
- 1948 Verrier Elwin
- 1949 C. von Fürer Haimendorf
- 1950 S. F. Nadel
- 1951 R. F. Fortune
- 1952 L. S. B. Leakey and Monica Wilson
- 1953 Donald F. Thomson
- 1954 Max Gluckman
- 1955 M. N. Srinivas
- 1956 Daryll Forde
- 1957 Phyllis M. Kaberry
- 1958 E. R. Leach
- 1959 J. A. Barnes
- 1960 J. C. Mitchell
- 1961 Hilda Kuper
- 1962 H. Lehman
- 1963 Derek Stenning
- 1964 Adrian Mayer
- 1965 Victor Turner
- 1966 Philip Gulliver
- 1967 Philip Mayer and Nigel A. Barnicot
- 1968 Mary Douglas and Eric Higgs
- 1969 Joseph Sidney Weiner
- 1970 Rodney Needham
- 1972 John d'A. Waechter
- 1973 S. J. Tambiah
- 1974 David Francis Pocock
- 1975 J. R. Goody
- 1976 Andrew Strathern and Marilyn Strathern
- 1977 Peter Ucko
- 1978 Phillip Tobias
- 1979 Colin Renfrew
- 1980 Abner Cohen
- 1982 Elizabeth Colson
- 1983 Maurice Bloch
- 1984 Alan Macfarlane
- 1985 David Parkin
- 1986 John Blacking
- 1988 Alfred Gell
- 1989 Tim Ingold
- 1990 C. G. Nicholas Mascie-Taylor
- 1991 Dan Sperber
- 1992 Ladislav Holy
- 1993 R. W. Wrangham
- 1994 Michael Herzfeld
- 1995 Simon Harrison
- 1996 Ray Abrahams
- 1997 James Carrier
- 1998 Nicholas Thomas
- 1999 Caroline Humphrey
- 2000 Adam Kuper
- 2002 Maurice Bloch
- 2003 Robert Hugh Layton
- 2004 Chris Stringer
- 2005 Clive Gamble
- 2006 Paul Sillitoe
- 2007 Andrew Whiten
- 2008 Daniel Miller and Brian Morris
- 2009 Wendy James
- 2010 Stephen Shennan
- 2011 Robert Foley
- 2012 Nigel Rapport
- 2013 Phyllis Lee
- 2014 Trevor Marchand
- 2015 Chris Hann
- 2016 Ruth Finnegan
- 2017 Dan Hicks
- 2018 Madeleine Reeves
- 2019 María Martínon-Torres
- 2020 Judith Okely
- 2021 Fiona M. Jordan
- 2022 Gavin Murray Lucas
- 2023 Tracy Kivell
- 2024 Marta Mirazón Lahr
- 2025 Nayanika Mookherjee
- 2026 Christopher J. Fowler

== RAI events ==
From time to time, the RAI runs lectures, workshops and other special events on topical issues. Its International Festivals of Ethnographic Film, run every two years in partnership with UK universities and other hosts, are a recognised part of the international ethnographic film calendar. Competitions for the Film Prizes attract entries from film-makers throughout the world.

== Fellowship ==
The RAI is composed of Members and Fellows. Individuals seeking full Fellowship status are usually required to be proposed by current Fellows who personally know the candidate. Fellowship of the Institute is primarily, though not exclusively, for persons who have a professional, academic involvement or an interest in the study of humankind or the social sciences. Fellows are elected by the RAI Council. The post-nominal letters FRAI denote Fellowship.

The RAI has approximately 1800 Fellows and Members.

== Presidents ==
The President of the RAI were generally elected for a two-year period:

- 1871–72 John Lubbock, 1st Baron Avebury
- 1873–74 George Busk
- 1875–76 Augustus Pitt Rivers
- 1877–78 John Evans
- 1879–80 Edward Burnett Tylor
- 1881–82 Augustus Pitt Rivers
- 1883–84 William Henry Flower
- 1885–88 Francis Galton
- 1890–91 John Beddoe
- 1891–92 Edward Burnett Tylor
- 1893–94 Alexander Macalister
- 1895–97 Edward William Brabrook
- 1898 Frederick William Rudler
- 1898–1900 Charles Hercules Read
- 1901–02 Alfred Cort Haddon
- 1903–04 Henry Balfour
- 1905–06 William Gowland
- 1907 Daniel John Cunningham
- 1908–09 William Ridgeway
- 1910 Herbert Hope Risley
- 1911–12 Alfred Percival Maudslay
- 1913–16 Arthur Keith
- 1917–18 Charles Hercules Read
- 1919–20 Everard im Thurn
- 1921–22 W. H. R. Rivers
- 1923–25 Charles Gabriel Seligman
- 1926–27 Harold John Edward Peake
- 1928–30 John Linton Myres
- 1931–33 Thomas Athol Joyce
- 1933–35 Edwin W. Smith
- 1935–37 Herbert Spencer Harrison
- 1937–38 Hermann Justus Braunholtz
- 1939–41 Alfred Reginald Radcliffe-Brown
- 1941–43 Hermann Justus Braunholtz
- 1943–45 John Henry Hutton
- 1945–47 Herbert John Fleure
- 1947–49 Cyril Daryll Forde
- 1949–51 E. E. Evans-Pritchard
- 1951–53 James Philip Mills
- 1953–55 Raymond William Firth
- 1955–57 FitzRoy Somerset, 4th Baron Raglan
- 1957–59 John Alexander Fraser Roberts
- 1959–61 Audrey Isabel Richards
- 1961–63 Isaac Schapera
- 1963–65 Joseph Sidney Weiner
- 1965–67 Meyer Fortes
- 1967–69 Maurice Freedman
- 1969–71 Geoffrey Ainsworth Harrison
- 1971–75 Edmund Ronald Leach
- 1975–77 Christoph von Fürer-Haimendorf
- 1977–79 Glyn Edmund Daniel
- 1979–83 Michael Herbert Day
- 1983–85 Adrian Curtis Mayer
- 1985–87 Jean La Fontaine
- 1987–89 Michael Banton
- 1989–91 Eric Sutherland
- 1991–94 Ernest Gellner
- 1994–97 Roland Littlewood
- 1997–01 John Davis
- 2001–04 Wendy James
- 2004–07 Alan Bilsborough
- 2007–11 Roy Ellen
- 2011–14 Clive Gamble
- 2014–18 André Singer
- 2018–2022 The Baroness Black of Strome
- 2022–2025 Deborah Swallow
- 2025 - Present Jonathan Spencer

== See also ==
- List of anthropology awards
