= F. G. Bailey =

British-American anthropologist (1924–2020)

Frederick George Bailey
- Born: 24 February 1924; Liverpool, England
- Died: 8 July 2020 (aged 96); Del Mar, California

Academic background
- Education: Oxford University; Manchester University
- Thesis: "A Village on the Hindu Frontier of Orissa" (1954)
- Doctoral advisor: Max Gluckman and Elizabeth Colson

Academic work
- Discipline: Anthropology
- Sub-discipline: Political anthropology
- Institutions: SOAS University of London; University of Sussex; University of California, San Diego

Frederick George Bailey (24 February 1924 – 8 July 2020), who published professionally as F. G. Bailey, was a British social anthropologist who spent the second half of his career in the United States at the University of California, San Diego (UCSD). He received his Ph.D. in social anthropology from Manchester University, working under Max Gluckman, and is closely associated with the Manchester School of social anthropology. A prolific writer of some sixteen books in anthropology, he is probably best known for his studies of local and organizational politics. He conducted fieldwork in Bisipāra, Odisha, India, and has also written on political functions, particularly the ways that social structure arises out of and is used by the interactions of individuals.

In 1956, Bailey joined the School of Oriental and African Studies (SOAS) as a lecturer and then a reader. In 1964 he moved to the new anthropology department at the University of Sussex.

He was elected a Fellow of the American Academy of Arts and Sciences in 1976 At the time he was a professor at the University of Sussex. He moved to San Diego, California in 1971 as part of the core faculty of the newly established department of anthropology at the University of California, San Diego, where he taught until retiring in 1997.

Bailey continued to write and publish anthropological books for another decade after his official retirement. He died in July 2020 at the age of 96.

== Selected books ==
- Bailey, F. G. (1957) Caste and the Economic Frontier: a village in highland Orissa. Manchester: Manchester University Press.
- -- (1960) Tribe, caste, and nation: a study of political activity and political change in highland Orissa. Manchester, UK: Manchester University Press.
- -- (1963) Politics and Social Change: Orissa in 1959. Berkeley, CA: University of California Press. ISBN 9780196352022.
- -- (1969) Stratagems and spoils: a social anthropology of politics. Oxford: Basil Blackwell.
- -- (1971) Gifts and Poisons: the politics of reputation. New York: Schocken Books.
- -- (1973) Debate and Compromise: The Politics of Innovation. Lanham, MD: Rowman & Littlefield Publishers. ISBN 9780874714142.
- -- (1977) Morality and Expediency: the folklore of academic politics. Oxford, UK: Basil Blackwell.
- -- (1983) The Tactical Uses of Passion : An Essay on Power, Reason and Reality. Ithaca, NY: Cornell University Press. ISBN 9780801498848
- -- (1988) Humbuggery and Manipulation: the art of leadership. Ithaca, NY: Cornell University Press.
- -- (1991) The Prevalence of Deceit. Ithaca, NY: Cornell University Press.
- -- (1993) The Kingdom of Individuals: an essay on self-respect and social obligation. Ithaca, NY: Cornell University Press.
- -- (1994) The Witch-Hunt, or, The triumph of morality. Ithaca, NY: Cornell University Press.
- -- (1996) The Civility of Indifference: on Domesticating Ethnicity. Ithaca, NY: Cornell University Press. ISBN 9780801432170
- -- (1998) The Need for Enemies: A Bestiary of Political Forms. Ithaca, NY: Cornell University Press. ISBN 9780801484742.
- -- (2001) Treasons, Stratagems, and Spoils. How Leaders Make Practical Use of Beliefs and Values. Boulder, CO: Westview Press.
- -- (2003) The Saving Lie: Truth & Method in the Social Sciences. Philadelphia, PA: University of Pennsylvania Press. ISBN 9780812237306.
- -- (2008) God-Botherers and Other True Believers: Religion, Diseducation, and Politics. New York, NY: Berghahn Books. ISBN 9781845455125.

== Selected articles and book chapters ==
- Bailey, F. G. (1963) "Capital, Saving and Credit in Highland Orissa", Ch 6 in Firth, Raymond, ed. Capital, Saving and Credit in Peasant Societies: Studies From Asia, Oceania, The Caribbean and Middle America. Chicago: Aldine Publishing.
- -- (1978) "Tertius Gaudens aut Tertium Numen." In Scale and Social Organization. F. Barth, ed. Oslo: Universitetforlget.
