= E. L. Peters =

British social anthropologist

Emrys Lloyd Peters
- Born: 1916
- Died: 16 February 1987 (aged 70–71)
- Spouse: Stella Peters

Academic background
- Education: University College of Wales, Aberystwyth; Oxford University
- Thesis: The Sociology of the Bedouin of Cyrenaica (1951)
- Doctoral advisor: E. E. Evans-Pritchard

Academic work
- Discipline: Social anthropologist
- Sub-discipline: Middle Eastern societies
- Institutions: University of Manchester
- Notable works: The Bedouin of Cyrenaica (1990)

Emrys Lloyd Peters (1916–1987) was a British social anthropologist.

== Life ==
Peters grew up in Merthyr Tydfil and studied Geography and History at University College of Wales, Aberystwyth, graduating immediately before the Second World War. He served in the Royal Air Force from 1939 to 1945, primarily in photographic reconnaissance in the Middle East and the Mediterranean. In 1945 he enrolled at Downing College, Cambridge, to study under E. E. Evans-Pritchard, following him to Oxford in 1947. Between 1948 and 1950 Peters conducted fieldwork among the Bedouin of Cyrenaica. Later in the 1950s and 1960s he spent further periods of fieldwork in Lebanon and Libya. Before completing his doctorate at the University of Oxford in 1951 he also studied Classical Arabic there. After graduating he briefly taught at Cambridge, and in 1952 was appointed Lecturer in Social Anthropology at the University of Manchester, becoming a full professor in 1968. From 1975 to 1977 he was President of the British Society for Middle Eastern Studies.

Peters retired in 1984, and died on 16 February 1987. The Department of Social Anthropology of the University of Manchester awards an Emrys Peters Essay Prize in his memory, from a gift made by his widow Stella.

== Work ==
- Emrys L. Peters, The Bedouin of Cyrenaica: Studies in Personal and Corporate Power, edited by Jack Goody, Emanuel Marx (Cambridge University Press, 1990).
