= Hyning Scout Wood =

Wood in Lancashire, England

Coordinates: 54.155°N 2.765°W

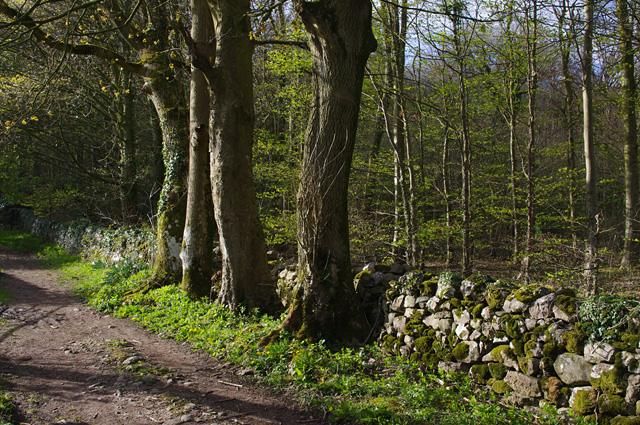
Hyning Scout Wood

Hyning Scout Wood is a wood between Yealand Conyers and Warton in Lancashire.

Its features include limestone pavement and coppicing for charcoal. The trees include beech, larch, sweet chestnut and Scots pine. Its woodland plants include bluebells, dog's mercury, hart's-tongue fern and Solomon's Seal. Roe deer and both grey and red squirrels are found there. There are the restored remains of a lime kiln. The wood's bluebells are notable.

It is managed by the Woodland Trust; is part of the Arnside and Silverdale Area of Outstanding Natural Beauty and is recognised as a Biological Heritage Site by the county. The wood contains a memorial plaque for anthropologist Mary Gluckman.
