= Edwin W. Smith =

South African Methodist missionary, anthropologist & author (1876-1957)

The Reverend Edwin William Smith FRAI (1876 – 1957) was a Primitive Methodist missionary, anthropologist and author who was born in South Africa, studied at Elmfield College from 1888, and then worked in Africa. The scholar of African Christian history, Adrian Hastings refers to 1925–1950 as "the age of Edwin Smith".

== Life ==
He was born at Aliwal North, South Africa, on 7 September 1876. His parents were missionaries of the Primitive Methodist Connexion. His father, John Smith (1840–1915), went to Aliwal North in 1874 and spent ten of the next fourteen years there. Returning to London, he became secretary of the Primitive Methodist Missionary Society in the 1890s and president of the Primitive Methodist Conference in 1898.

In 1899 he married Julia, daughter of James Fitch of Peasenhall, Suffolk. He served in Africa as a missionary of the Primitive Methodist Church, 1898–1915.

== Major works ==
(selected from thirty-five titles)

- 1907 Handbook of the Ila Language. Oxford: Oxford Univ. Press.
- 1915 Ila New Testament (trans.). London: British and Foreign Bible Society.
- 1920 (with Andrew Murray Dale). The Ila-Speaking Peoples of Northern Rhodesia. London: Macmillan.
- 1923 The Religion of Lower Races. New York: Macmillan.
- 1925 Robert Moffat: One of God's Gardeners. London: Church Missionary Society.
- 1926 The Christian Mission in Africa. London: International Missionary Council.
- 1926 The Golden Stool. London: Holborn Publishing House.
- 1929 Aggrey of Africa. London: Student Christian Movement.
- 1929 The Secret of the African. London: Student Christian Movement.
- 1929 The Shrine of a People's Soul. London: Church Missionary Society.
- 1936 African Beliefs and Christian Faith. London: Lutterworth Press.
- 1939 The Mabilles of Basutoland. London: Hodder and Stoughton.
- 1943 The Secret of the African. United Society for Christian Literature. (Seven lectures delivered as "Long lectures" in 1927–28, at the invitation of the Church Missionary Society.)
- 1943 African Beliefs and Christian Faith. United Society for Christian Literature.
- 1946 Knowing the African. United Society for Christian, Literature.
- 1949 The Life and Times of Daniel Lindley 1801-80. The Epworth Press.
- 1950 African Ideas of God. A Symposium. London: Edinburgh House Press.
- 1953 The Blessed Missionaries: Being the Phelps-Stokes Lectures delivered in Cape Town in 1949. Oxford University Press; with foreword by Sir Herbert Stanley.
- 1957 Great Lion of Bechuanaland: The Life and Times of Roger Price, Missionary and Statesman. Independent Press.

Archival materials on Smith are to be found in three locations:

- (1) The Methodist Missionary Society Archives, the School of Oriental and African Studies, London. These items include diaries, translation work, journalistic material, photograph albums, and some unpublished material.
- (2) Bible Society Archives, Cambridge, England. These items include diaries and reports for India, 1938–39, correspondence, and drafts of John 1–6 in Basic and Simplified English.
- (3) In the Hartford Seminary Archives, Hartford, Connecticut.

== Works About Edwin W. Smith ==
- McVeigh, M. God in Africa: Conceptions of God in African Traditional Religion and Christianity. Cape Cod, Mass.: Claude Starke, 1974.
- Peel, J. D. Y. "Edwin Williams Smith." In Dictionary of National Biography, Missing Persons. Oxford: Oxford Univ. Press, 1993.
- Young, W. John. "Edwin Smith: Pioneer Explorer in African Christian Theology." Epworth Review, 1993, pp. 80–88.
- -----. The Integrative Vision of a Pioneer Africanist, Edwin W. Smith (1876-1957). M.A. thesis, Univ. of Bristol, July 1997.
- -----. "The Legacy of Edwin W. Smith." International Bulletin of Missionary Research 25.3 (2001): 126–130.
- -----. The Quiet Wise Spirit: Edwin W. Smith (1876–1957) and Africa. Norwich: Epworth Press, 2002. ISBN 9780716205531

== See also ==
- Smith, Edwin W., Dictionary of African Christian Biography, Boston University School of Theology
