= Moshe Shokeid =

Israeli anthropologist

Moshe Shokeid (Hebrew: משה שוקד) is a social anthropologist specializing in American and Israeli studies. He has taught in the Department of Sociology and Anthropology at Tel Aviv University since 1968, and has been a visiting scholar at several universities in the U.S. and Europe. Shokeid has conducted research on topics related to both Israeli and U.S. society. He is the author of six books in English, four books in Hebrew (including two semi-autobiographical books), a few editorial books and many professional journal articles. He was a winner of the Ben-Zvi prize, named after Israel’s second President, who spent his life working to protect Israel's religious and cultural diversity.

== Early life ==
Shokeid is a member of the sabra generation, the first generation of Israelis raised in modern Israel (born in Tel Aviv to a mother from Poland and father from Lithuania). He received his B.A in Sociology and Middle Eastern studies in 1961 and his Master's degree in Sociology in 1964 from the Hebrew University of Jerusalem. At the time, he assumed he was going to be a Middle Eastern specialist or an Orientalist. He went on to work as a rural sociologist studying new immigrant communities with the Jewish Agency Land Settlement Department in the Negev Region.

Shokeid felt that sociological research methods were too formal and abstract lacking cultural and human sensitivity, which compelled him to move into the field of anthropology. He attended the University of Manchester in England where he studied under Max Gluckman and received his Ph.D. in Social Anthropology in 1968. During this time, he conducted his dissertation fieldwork in Israel, where he studied a village of Atlas Mountain Jews, for which he won the Ben-Zvi Prize in 1974.

== Career ==
After finishing his Ph.D., Shokeid returned to Israel, where he began teaching in the Department of Sociology and Anthropology at Tel Aviv University. He has also been a visiting scholar at New York University, the CUNY Graduate Center, the Stockholm University, and the Free University of Berlin. He has been a Rockefeller Fellow at the University of Iowa, a Visiting Member at the Princeton Institute for Advanced Study, and a visiting scholar at the International Forum for U.S. Studies at the University of Illinois at Urbana-Champaign. From 1987 to 1989, he served as President of the Israel Anthropological Association. He has received grants from the Ford Foundation, the Lucius Littauer Foundation, and the Memorial Foundation for Jewish Culture.

Shokeid has conducted research and published his work on North African immigrants in Israel and on the Arab residents who remained in Jaffa after the 1948 War. While a visiting fellow at Queens College in New York City from 1982 to 1984, he conducted research among Israeli emigrants in New York. A few years later (and during the 1990s) he conducted research at Congregation Beit Simchat Torah, the gay and lesbian synagogue in Greenwich Village. Shokeid has since published multiple works on the United States, including (during the 2000s) on the New York City gay, lesbian, bisexual and transgender Community Center in Greenwich Village and the various voluntary associations that met there.

== Books ==
- M. Shokeid. The Dual Heritage: Immigrants from the Atlas Mountains in an Israeli Village, Manchester: Manchester University Press, XXIX, 245 pp. 1971. (Augmented edition, New Brunswick, New Jersey: Transaction Books, XXXIV, 254 pp. 1985).
- S. Deshen and M. Shokeid. The Predicament of Homecoming: Cultural and Social Life of North African Immigrants in Israel, Ithaca, NY: Cornell University Press, 250 pp. 1974.
- M. Shokeid and S. Deshen. Distant Relations: Ethnicity and Politics among Arabs and North African Jews in Israel, New York: Praeger and Bergin, 190 pp. 1982.
- M. Shokeid and S. Deshen. The Generation of Transition: Continuity and Change among North African Immigrants, Jerusalem: Ben-Zvi Institute, 235 pp. 1977 (expanded edition, 281 pp. 1999) (Hebrew).
- M. Shokeid. Children of Circumstances: Israeli Emigrants in New York, Ithaca, NY: Cornell University Press, 230 pp. 1988.
- M. Shokeid. A Gay Synagogue in New York, NY: Columbia University Press, 264 pp. 1995. (Augmented edition, Philadelphia, PA: University of Pennsylvania Press, 272 pp. 2003).
- M. Shokeid. An Israeli’s Voyage: Tel-Aviv, New York and Between, Tel-Aviv: Yediot Books, 251 pp. 2002 (Hebrew).
- M. Shokeid. Herzl Doesn’t Live Here Anymore, Tel-Aviv: Carmel Publishing House. 159 pp. 2005. (Hebrew).
- M. Shokeid. Three Jewish Journeys Through An Anthropologist's Lens: From Morocco to the Negev, Zion To The Big Apple, The Closet to the Bimah. Brighton, MA: Academic Studies Press, 399 pp. 2009.
- M. Shokeid. An Anthropological Perspective: A View from Near and Far. Resling, 279 pp. 2012 (Hebrew).
