= James Philip Mills =

British member of the Indian Civil Service and ethnographer

- Born: 18 February 1890; Cheshire, England
- Died: 12 May 1960 (aged 70); Dorset, England
- Occupation: Indian Civil Service

James Philip Mills CSI, CIE, FRAI (1890 – 1960) was a member of the Indian Civil Service and an ethnographer.

== Early years ==
James Philip Mills was born on 18 February 1890, younger son of James Edward Mills and his wife Ada Smith. He was educated at Windlesham House School, Winchester College (1903–1908) and Corpus Christi College, Oxford (1909–1912).

== Career ==
In 1913 Mills joined the Indian Civil Service and was posted to Assam Province. During the First World War he served as a trooper in the Jumna Valley Light Horse.[4] In 1916 he was assigned to the Naga Hills District, where he was appointed Subdivisional Officer based at Mokokchung.[2]

In 1926 he advised the government on the administration of the Chittagong Hill Tracts and was acting Deputy Commissioner of Cachar 1927-8. [4]

He was Deputy Commissioner Naga Hills District, based at Kohima during the 1930s.[3]

Alongside his official tasks, Mills took an interest in ornithology, gathering information on birds and mammals for the Bombay Natural History Society, which was published in 1923.[2]

While at Oxford he had acquired an interest in anthropology and inspired by the curator of the Pitt Rivers Museum. Henry Balfour, he and his colleague J.H. Hutton made important ethnographic collections for that institution.[4] Philip Mills published three monographs on the Nagas: The Lhota Nagas 1922, The Ao Nagas 1926 and The Rengma Nagas 1937. [4] In 1930 he was appointed Honorary Director of Ethnography for Assam. The same year he married Pamela Moira Foster-Vesey-FitzGerald. From 1943-47 he was Adviser to the Governor of Assam for Tribal Areas and States.[3] This enabled him to visit little-known places north of the Bramhaputra such as the Subansiri and Lohit areas.[3]

Mills retired from the Indian Civil Service in 1947, and the following year was appointed Reader in Language and Culture at the School of Oriental and African Studies, University of London until his retirement in 1954.[3] After his death, his collection of several hundred photographs was donated to SOAS. [4].

From 1951 to 1953 Philip Mills served as President of the Royal Anthropological Institute. He died on 12 May 1960.

== Publications ==
- The Lhota Nagas, 1922
- The Ao Nagas, 1926
- "Folk Stories in Lhota Naga", J. Asiat. Soc. Beng., 22/5 (1926)
- with J.H. Hutton, "Ancient Monoliths of North Cachar", J. Asiat. Soc. Beng., 25/1 (1929)
- The Rengma Nagas, 1937
- The Mishmis of the Lohit Valley, Assam, Presidential Address: Jour. RAI Vol.82 (1952)
- Anthropology as a Hobby, Presidential Address: Jour. RAI Vol. 83 (1953)

Archives

- SOAS, diaries and papers relating to Assam; photographic collection.
- MSS Royal Anthropological Institute London, Mongsen Ao word list.
- U. Cam., Centre for South Asian Studies, papers.
- U. Oxf., Pitt Rivers Museum, artefacts and papers.
- Anthropological research notes and other papers of J P Mills are held by SOAS Archives.

== Awards ==
- 1941: C.I.E
- 1942: Rivers Memorial Medal of the Royal Anthropological Institute
- 1945: Gold medal, The Royal Asiatic Society of Bengal.
- 1947: C.S.I.

== Sources ==
- Mey, Wolfgang (2009). J.P. MIlls and the CHittagong Hill Tracts, 1926/1927.
