= Bill Epstein =

British social anthropologist

Arnold Leonard Epstein, known as Bill Epstein (13 September 1924 in Liverpool – 9 November 1999 in Hove), was a British social anthropologist. A member of the "Manchester School", he was known for his research on ethnicity and identity, particularly his book Ethos and Identity (1978), and for his ethnographic work in Central Africa and New Britain. In 1951 he joined the Rhodes-Livingstone Institute in Lusaka. He was a professor at the Australian National University (1958–1972) and Sussex University (1972–1982), as well as the vice president of the Royal Anthropological Institute (1982–1984). He was married to T. Scarlett Epstein and had two daughters.
