= Clive Gamble =

British archaeologist and anthropologist (born 1951)

Professor Clive Gamble FSA FRAI FBA
- Born: 1951 (age 74–75)

Academic work
- Discipline: Archaeology and anthropology
- Sub-discipline: Human origin Neanderthals; Prehistory; Palaeolithic Era; Cognitive archaeology
- Institutions: University of Essex; University of Southampton; Royal Holloway, University of London

Clive Stephen Gamble, FSA, FRAI, FBA (born 1951) is a British archaeologist and anthropologist. He has been described as the "UK's foremost archaeologist investigating our earliest ancestors."

== Early life and education ==
Gamble was born in 1951. He was educated at Brighton College, a private school in Brighton, England. He studied at Jesus College, Cambridge, graduating with a Bachelor of Arts (BA) degree in 1972: as per tradition, his BA was promoted to a Master of Arts (MA Cantab) degree in 1975. Remaining at Jesus College, he studied for a Doctor of Philosophy (PhD) degree which he completed in 1978. His doctoral thesis was titled "Animal Communities and their Relationship to Prehistoric Economies in Western Europe".

== Academic career ==
From 1975 to 1979, Gamble was an experimental officer in archaeology at the University of Southampton. In 1979, he became a lecturer in archaeology. He was promoted to Professor in 1996. In 1999 he founded the Centre for the Archaeology of Human Origins at Southampton.

In 2004 Gamble was appointed to a Research Professorship in the Centre for Quaternary Research at Royal Holloway College, in the University of London. He subsequently returned to Southampton as a professor in the Department of Archaeology in 2011. In 2015 he was a Trustee of the British Museum. He retired from Southampton in 2017 and was appointed an emeritus professor.

=== Research and Positions ===
Gamble's main research interests are the archaeology of human origins, the social life of the earliest humans and the timing of their global colonisation.

Gamble is a Trustee of the British Museum (August 2010-August 2014), Fellow of the British Academy, Fellow and Vice President of the Society of Antiquaries and Fellow and, from 2011 to 2014, President of the Royal Anthropological Institute. He received the Rivers Memorial Medal from the Royal Anthropological Institute in 2005. In 2002 he presented Where Do We Come From?, a six-part documentary screened on Channel Five. In 2000 his book The Palaeolithic Societies of Europe won the Society for American Archaeology Book Award.

Gamble is currently part of the NERC-sponsored team that is looking to date key evolutionary events in Europe over the last 60,000 years by dating deposits of volcanic ash. The events that the team is seeking to date includes the arrival of modern humans, the Neanderthal extinction, and the post-Ice Age re-colonisation of northern Europe approximately 16,000 years ago by the direct ancestors of most modern Europeans.

Gamble was a co-director on the British Academy Centenary project (2003-2010) Lucy to language: The archaeology of the social brain

Gamble led a fieldwork programme in Greece, which recorded and published all the evidence from field surveys for Palaeolithic and Mesolithic settlement undertaken there in the last 50 years. This led to the publication of The Prehistoric Stones of Greece which provided the first overview of all stone tools discovered in Greece. There is no comparable overview elsewhere in Europe.

== Honours ==
On 26 November 1981, Gamble was elected a Fellow of the Society of Antiquaries of London (FSA). In 2000, he was elected a Fellow of the British Academy (FBA). He is also an elected Fellow of the Royal Anthropological Institute (FRAI).

== Selected works ==
- Gamble, C. 2021 Making Deep History: Zeal, Perseverance, and the Time Revolution of 1859. Oxford University Press.
- Dunbar, R., Gamble, C. and Gowlett, J. 2014 Lucy to Language: The Benchmark Papers. Oxford University Press.
- Gamble, C. 2013 Settling the earth: the archaeology of deep human history. Cambridge University Press.
- Boismier, W. A., Gamble, C. and Coward, F. (eds.) 2012 Neanderthals among mammoths: excavations at Lynford Quarry, Norfolk UK, English Heritage Monographs.
- Dunbar, R., Gamble, C. and Gowlett, J. (eds.) 2010 Social brain, distributed mind, Oxford University Press. Proceedings of the British Academy 158.
- Gamble, C. S. 2007. Origins and revolutions: human identity in earliest prehistory. Cambridge University Press.
- Gamble, C. 2007 Archaeology: the basics. 2nd edition. Routledge.
- Gamble, C. S., and M. Porr. (eds.) 2005. The individual hominid in context: archaeological investigations of Lower and Middle Palaeolithic landscapes, locales and artefacts. Routledge.
- Gamble, C. 2003 Timewalkers: The Prehistory of Global Colonization. The History Press.
- Gamble, C. 1999 The Palaeolithic Societies of Europe. Cambridge University Press.
- Gamble, C. 1986 The Palaeolithic Settlement of Europe. Cambridge University Press.
