= Francis Wilson (economist) =

South African economist (1939–2022)

Emeritus Professor Francis Wilson
- Born: 17 May 1939; Livingstone, Northern Rhodesia (now Zambia)
- Died: 24 April 2022 (aged 82)
- Education: St. Andrew's College, Grahamstown
- Alma mater: University of Cape Town; University of Cambridge
- Occupation: Economics
- Employer: University of Cape Town
- Parents: Godfrey Wilson; Monica Wilson

Francis Wilson (17 May 1939 – 24 April 2022) was a South African economist.

== Biography ==
He was the son of the anthropologists Godfrey Wilson and Monica Wilson. Wilson attended St. Andrew's College, Grahamstown. He obtained a Bachelor of Science (BSc) in physics from the University of Cape Town and a master's degree in economics as well as a doctorate, both from the University of Cambridge.

Wilson was a member of the academic teaching staff in the School of Economics at the University of Cape Town. He was the founder and director of the Southern African Labour and Development Research Unit (SALDRU). He was also a visiting professor at the Woodrow Wilson School of Public and International Affairs at Princeton University. In 2001 Wilson chaired the International Social Science Council’s Scientific Committee of the International Comparative Research Program on Poverty.

Wilson was the Pro-Vice Chancellor of UCT in 2012.

== Awards and honours ==
In 2016, Wilson was awarded an honorary doctorate from the University of Cape Town for his more than 30 years teaching at UCT's School of Economics, where he made seminal contributions to unearthing the exploitation of South Africa's migrant labourers, particularly in the gold mines.

== Works ==
- Wilson, Francis (1972). Labour in the South African Gold Mines 1911-1969. Cambridge University Press. ISBN 978-0-521-17509-8.
- Wilson, Francis; Ramphele, Mamphela (1989). Uprooting poverty: the South African challenge : report for the Second Carnegie Inquiry into Poverty and Development in Southern Africa. David Philip. ISBN 978-0-86486-072-9.
- Wilson, Francis; Kanji, Nazneen; Braathen, Einar (2001). Poverty reduction: what role for the state in today's globalized economy?. NAEP. ISBN 978-1-85649-953-8.
- Wilson, Francis (2001). "Globalization: A View from the South". In Charles V. Hamilton (ed.). Beyond Racism: Race and Inequality in Brazil, South Africa, and the United States. Lynne Rienner Publishers. ISBN 978-1-58826-002-4.
- Wilson, Francis (Winter 2001). "Minerals and Migrants: How the Mining Industry Has Shaped South Africa". Daedalus. 130 (1). MIT Press on behalf of American Academy of Arts & Sciences: 99–121. JSTOR 20027681.
- Wilson, Francis (2003). "Understanding the Past to Reshape the Future: Problems of South Africa's Transition". The Economic Future in Historical Perspective.
- Wilson, Francis (2004). "Anglican Reflections from a South African Economist". In Peccoud, Dominique (ed.). Philosophical and Spiritual Perspectives on Decent Work. International Labour Organization. ISBN 978-92-2-114155-6.
- Wilson, Francis (15 March 2011). Dinosaurs, Diamonds and Democracy: A Short, Short History of South Africa. Umuzi. ISBN 978-1415201404.
