= Ronald Frankenberg =

British anthropologist (1929–2015)

- Born: 20 October 1929; London
- Died: 20 November 2015 (aged 86)
- Education: Cambridge University, Manchester University
- Known for: medical anthropology
- Spouse: Pauline Frankenberg
- Awards: Bronislaw Malinowski Award
- Scientific career
- Fields: anthropology, sociology

Ronald Frankenberg (20 October 1929 – 20 November 2015) was a British anthropologist and sociologist, known for his study of conflict and decision-making in a Welsh village. He also contributed to the development of medical anthropology.

Frankenberg was a member of the Manchester School of British Social Anthropology.

== Biography ==
Frankenberg was born in London on 20 October 1929 to Louis and Sarah Frankenberg. He obtained a degree at Cambridge University and completed his MA and PhD at the University of Manchester. He was a student of Max Gluckman. For his PhD, he studied the complexities and conflict in a Welsh mining community called Glyn Ceiriog. This research was published as Village on the Border.

Frankenberg began teaching anthropology at Keele University in 1969. He was involved in studies concerning children in film, AIDS literature, and representations of death in the twentieth century. His works during the 1970s are considered to be among those by socially-oriented physicians that led to the emergence of critical medical anthropology in the United States and the United Kingdom. In his later years, Frankenberg was active in promoting this field in the United States.

Frankenberg was married to Dr. Pauline Frankenberg (née Hunt), author of Gender and Class Consciousness (1980). One of his daughters was sociologist Ruth Frankenberg.

== Publications ==
- Village on the Border (1957)
- Communities in Britain (1966)

== See also ==
- Bronislaw Malinowski Award
