= Jaap van Velsen =

Jaap van Velsen (28 September 1921 – 6 May 1990) was a Dutch-born British anthropologist.

== Life ==
Jaap Van Velsen was born in Soerabaja as the son of Wilhelmina Louisa Metzelaar and Abraham van Velsen, a businessman at the time and later a politician with a focus on culture.

Jaap studied law at Utrecht before studying anthropology at Oxford and Manchester. He did fieldwork among the Tonga in Nyasaland, developing a method of 'situational analysis' in his 1957 PhD (eventually published as The Politics of Kinship), and later fieldwork among the Karamajong in Uganda. In 1959 he joined the African Studies department at the University College of Rhodesia and Nyasaland, but was deported in 1966 as a result of his opposition to Ian Smith's UDI. He became the first professor of sociology at the University of Zambia, and later Director of the Institute of African Studies. In 1973 he moved to the University College of Wales, Aberystwyth before retiring in 1983.

Living with multiple sclerosis, he committed suicide in 1990.

Jaap was married to Ruth van Velsen (1923-2010) and together they had three children: Cleo, Peter and Jan.

== Works ==
- The Politics of Kinship, 1964. Introduction by Clyde Mitchell.
