= Secular National Dravida Party =

- Leader: S. Suvarnakumar
- Chairman: S. Suvarnakumar
- Founded: 7 January 2004
- Headquarters: Kadakkavoor Buildings, Thumpara Nagar, Mundakkal, Kollam City, Kollam-691001, Kerala
- ECI Status: registered unrecognised parties
- Alliance: National Democratic Alliance
- Seats in Lok Sabha: 0
- Seats in Rajya Sabha: 0

Secular National Dravida Party, was a political party in the Indian state of Kerala. The party was founded on 7 January 2004 by elements of the Ezhava caste organization Ezhava Mahajana Sabha. Founding chairman was S. Suvarnakumar. The party professed itself to 'Sreenarayanism', the teachings of Shree Narayana Guru. The party also demanded higher representation for the Ezhava caste in the political process.

The party intended to fill the function of a political wing of the main Ezhava caste movement, Sree Naryana Dharma Paripalana yogam. However, SNDP Yogam was not interested in the project and the party wandered out into the political wilderness. In the beginning of April the party was one of the founding organizations of the Progressive Democratic Front. 2016 Kerala election SNDP support National Democratic Alliance candidate.
