= Ethel G. Aginsky =

American anthropologist

- Born: Ethel Goldberg; September 24, 1910
- Died: March 28, 1990 (aged 79)

Academic background
- Thesis: A grammar of the Mende language (1935)

Ethel Gertrude Goldberg Aginsky (September 24, 1910 – March 28, 1990) was a linguistic anthropologist, author, and professor, who conducted research among Indigenous peoples of California, primarily on the Pomo. She was elected a fellow of the American Association for the Advancement of Science in 1954.

== Education and career ==
Aginsky was born in Scranton, Pennsylvania in 1910. She received a bachelor of arts degree (1932) and an M.A. (1933) from New York University. Her master of arts thesis focused on anthropologist Waldemar Jochelson's Aleutian grammar. She then earned her doctorate under Franz Boas in 1934 from Columbia University. For her thesis, "A Grammar of the Mende Language", she worked with Mende speaker Dwight Sumner from Sierra Leone.

Additionally, Aginsky was a professor of anthropology at Hunter College, and served as chair of the department from 1939 until 1945. She also held positions as an associate professor for Syracuse University, and a visiting professor at University of Buenos Aires in 1958. In 1980 the University of San Diego announced a new program in lateralizations based on the work of the Aginskys and as part of this they were announced as adjunct professors at the university.

She and her husband served as co-directors of the Institute for World Peace and Understanding in La Jolla, California.

== Research ==
Aginsky undertook fieldwork in Tacoma, Washington between 1935 and 1936 to transcribe and translate Puyallup Txwilshootseed texts.

Starting in the 1930s, she conducted fieldwork with her anthropologist husband Burt W. Aginsky with Pomo people in California. The anthropologist Margaret Mead described the collaboration between the Aginsky's as "a constant source of delight". The Aginsky's established the Social Sciences Field Laboratory in 1939 as a means to study cultural changes in the social sciences and to train people in the field work needed to conduct social sciences research. The work conducted at the field laboratory culminated in the co-authored book Deep Valley, which included interviews with Tim Jimerson, a Pomo man who spoke on the identification of self within the community. The research into the Pomo people also examined gaming and the respected role of gamblers within the Pomo society.

Aginsky's work on language has taken multiple forms. Her 1948 publication on language universals has been noted as the first instance of such research. Her Ph.D. work on the Mende language was the first to understand and decode a tonal language. In 1964 Aginsky spent time in Miami at the Seaquarium on an anthropological study centering on language usage by porpoises.

Aginsky was fluent in at least 12 languages, and was a pianist.

== Selected publications ==
- Aginsky, Ethel G. (1935). "A Grammar of the Mende Language". Language. 11 (3): 7–111. doi:10.2307/522079. JSTOR 522079.
- W, Burt; Aginsky, Ethel G. (December 1948). "The Importance of Language Universals". WORD. 4 (3): 168–172. doi:10.1080/00437956.1948.11659339. ISSN 0043-7956.
- Aginsky, Burt W.; Aginsky, Ethel G. (1950). "The Pomo : A Profile of Gambling Among Indians". The Annals of the American Academy of Political and Social Science. 269 (1): 108–113. doi:10.1177/000271625026900115. ISSN 0002-7162.
- Aginsky, Burt W.; Aginsky, Ethel G. (1950). "The Pomo: A Profile of Gambling among Indians". The Annals of the American Academy of Political and Social Science. 269: 108–113. doi:10.1177/000271625026900115. ISSN 0002-7162. JSTOR 1027823.
- Aginsky, Burt W.; Aginsky, Ethel G. (1967-01-01). Deep Valley. Stein and Day.

== Honors and awards ==
Aginsky was named a fellow of the American Anthropological Association in 1935, and was elected fellow of the American Association for the Advancement of Science in 1954. She is also a fellow of the New York Academy of Sciences, the American Association of University Professors, and the International Linguistic Association.

== See also ==
- Puyallup people
- Aleut language
