= Jonathan Spencer =

British social anthropologist and academic (born 1954)

Professor Jonathan Spencer FRSE FBA

Regius Professor of South Asian Language, Culture and Society University of Edinburgh
- Incumbent
- Assumed office 2014

Professor of Anthropology of South Asia University of Edinburgh
- In office 1999–2014

Personal details
- Born: Jonathan Robert Spencer; 23 December 1954 (age 71) Dorking, Surrey, England
- Citizenship: United Kingdom
- Spouses: Julia Swannell (m. 1987–1992) Prof. Janet Carsten (m. 1994)
- Education: University of Edinburgh; University of Chicago; University of Oxford
- Awards: Fellow of the Royal Society of Edinburgh (2011); Fellow of the British Academy (2018)

Jonathan Robert Spencer, FRSE, FBA (born 23 December 1954) is a British social anthropologist and academic. Since 2014, he has been the Regius Professor of South Asian Language, Culture and Society at the University of Edinburgh.

== Early life and education ==
Spencer was born on 23 December 1954 in Dorking, Surrey, England. He studied social anthropology at the University of Edinburgh, and graduated with an undergraduate Master of Arts (MA Hons) degree in 1977. He was then a postgraduate student at the University of Chicago, and graduated with a postgraduate Master of Arts (AM) degree in 1981. He undertook postgraduate research at the University of Oxford, and graduated with a Doctor of Philosophy (DPhil) degree in 1986.

== Academic career ==
Spencer was a lecturer at the University of Sussex in 1987, a lecturer at the London School of Economics from 1989 to 1990. In 1990, he joined the School of Social and Political Science, University of Edinburgh. From 1999 to 2014, he was Professor of Anthropology of South Asia. On 15 March 2014, he was appointed Regius Professor of South Asian Language, Culture and Society.

Spencer's field of interest include nationalism, politics, violence, Buddhism and Sri Lanka. He has published many works on politics of Sri Lanka and the Sri Lankan civil war. He has also made significant contributions to the history and theory of anthropology. Together with his University of Edinburgh colleague, Alan Barnard, the two have produced a history of anthropological theory which continues to be a widely used textbook at institutions of higher education.

== Personal life ==
In 1987, Spencer married Julia Swannell; she died in 1992. In 1994, he married Professor Janet Carsten; Professor of Social and Cultural Anthropology at the University of Edinburgh. He has one daughter with Janet.

== Honours ==
In March 2011, Spencer was elected a Fellow of the Royal Society of Edinburgh (FRSE). He was elected Fellow of the British Academy in July 2018.

== Selected works ==
- A Sinhala Village in a Time of Trouble: Politics and Change in Rural Sri Lanka (1990) - Oxford University Press
- Post-colonialism and the Political Imagination (1997)
- Fatima and the Enchanted Toffees: An Essay on Contingency, Narrative and Therap (1997)
- On Not Becoming a Terrorist: Problems of Memory, Agency and Community in the Sri Lankan Conflict (2000) - University of California Press
- British Social Anthropology: A Retrospective
- Anthropology, Politics and the State: Democracy and Violence in South Asia (2007) - Cambridge University Press
- Spencer, Jonathan; Goodhand, Jonathan; Hasbullah, Shahul; Klem, Bart; Korf, Benedikt; Silva, Kalinga Tudor (2014). Checkpoint, Temple, Church and Mosque: A Collaborative Ethnography of War and Peace. Pluto Press. ISBN 978-0745331218.
