= Northern Rhodesia Journal =

Journal published by the Northern Rhodesian Government (1950-1965)

- Subject: Northern Rhodesia
- Language: English

Publication details
- History: 1950–1965
- Publisher: Northern Rhodesian Government Printer (Northern Rhodesia)

Standard abbreviations
- ISO 4: North. Rhod. J.

The Northern Rhodesia Journal, often referred to simply as "NRJ", was produced between 1950 and 1965, by the Northern Rhodesian Government Printer, to record some of the early history of Northern Rhodesia. It is one of the most important sources of historical information on Zambia before and during its colonial era, up to its independence from the United Kingdom.

== Format ==
The Journal is quarto in size.

The first two volumes comprised six "Numbers" each, and the page numbering started with 1 for each Number. For the remaining four volumes (the first three of which also had six Numbers) the pages in each volume were numbered continuously, started with page 1 in Number 1 of each volume. The final volume (VI) had but three Numbers, the pages numbered continuously, started with page 1 in Number 1, and, as it was produced after Independence, was titled The Zambia Northern Rhodesia Journal.

== Significance ==
The Journal had no cut-off dates; it covered ancient history right through to its "present day" (1965). One period of significant history which is covered is often called the period of welfare colonialism because of the impact of the Colonial Development and Welfare Acts of 1940 and 1945. These Acts were products of the same impulses which drove the Beveridge Report and the creation of the Welfare State in Britain after the Second World War. The NRJ documents the remarkable results of the investments made under the provisions of the Acts in Northern Rhodesia, which added enhanced educational, health and agricultural development services to the settled peace and impartial rule of law that the Colonial Service provided and which was a fundamental reason for the popular support documented by historians among the African populations. It was the loss of that impartiality which was most bitterly regretted after independence, especially in Barotseland, which became the Western Province of Zambia, and which felt itself to be systematically discriminated against by the independent government. The resentment still smoulders.

The current retreat from ideological 'development', not least because of the evidence of unintended bad consequences of 'development' aid, and the rediscovery of the importance of practical, grass-roots, value for money help, makes the case-evidence of contemporary journals like the NRJ especially valuable sources for organisations like Oxfam or the Department for International Development.
