= Haim Hazan =

Israeli professor of sociology and social anthropology (born 1947)

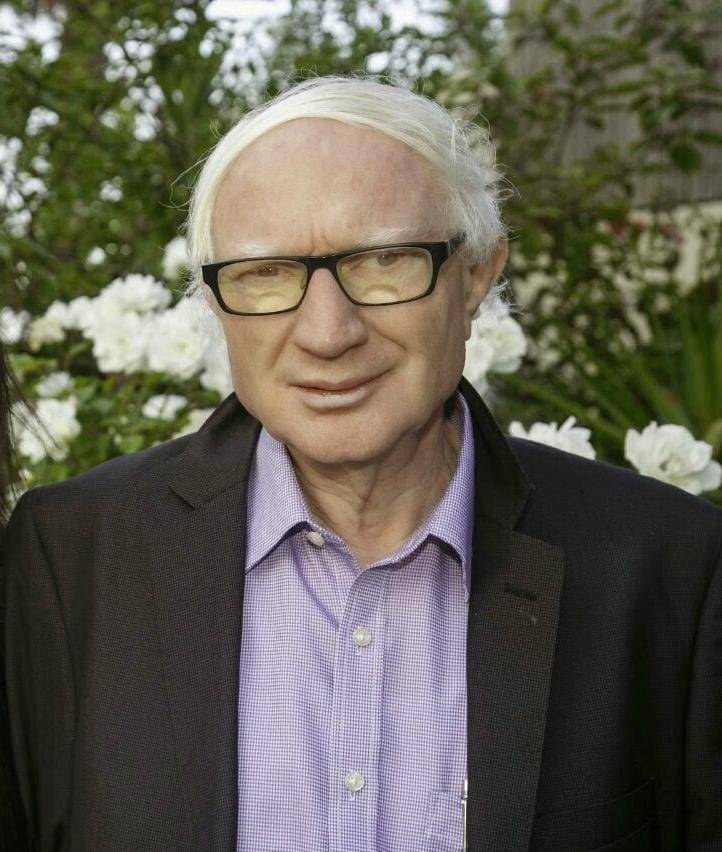

Haim Hazan (Hebrew: חיים חזן; born 1947) is a professor of sociology and social anthropology at Tel Aviv University in Israel. His research focuses on old age as a social phenomenon. He is also an active partner at the Herzog Institute for the Study of Aging and Old Age. He is the author of more than 20 books. Hazan is the editor of the magazine Israeli Sociology and has been the director of the Institute for Social Research at the Horowitz Institute and the Herczeg Institute on Aging at Tel Aviv University.

== Biography ==
Haim Hazan was born in Jerusalem. When he was 10, his parents moved to Givatayim, where he spent his adolescence. He studied for his B.A. in sociology, anthropology and literature and his M.A. in sociology and anthropology, both at Tel Aviv University, during 1967–1972. The subject of his thesis was "Revelations of Relative Totality in the Organization of Life in Retirement Homes." He studied for his Ph.D. at University College in London, guided by Professor Michael Gilsenan, during 1973–1976. While writing his doctorate, he was in contact with Mary Douglas, the well-known anthropologist, whose thinking and theories influenced the start of his career. He was appointed as a lecturer at Tel Aviv University in 1976, and appointed Professor in 1994. Since 2008, he has been editor of the magazine Israeli Sociology. He was director of the Institute for Social Research, the Horowitz Institute and the Herczeg Institute on Aging at Tel Aviv University.

He was the academic advisor for the Center for Educational Technology's curriculum on aging and old age, and served as chairman of the professional committee at the Israeli Ministry of Education for a curriculum for the Bagrut in social anthropology.

== Research ==
Haim Hazan is an anthropologist who researches old age as a social phenomenon. In his work, he identifies and characterizes the reality in which the elderly live. He uses old age to examine questions such as: in which way do the elderly constitute time and what language do they use to do it; and to examine questions of identity: how do the elderly define themselves? Contrary to common approaches, which determine that the ailments of old age are a result of functional changes which deplete the resources of the elderly individual, Hazan believes in differentiating between functioning and function and between the elderly and old age. The elderly are the product of physiological-biological deterioration, while functions and old age are derivatives of society and culture. There is no "natural" affinity between the former and the latter, it is only the human environment in which the elderly live that forces that affinity on them and on itself as though it were an inevitability. The differentiation which distinguishes between the two is similar to the differentiation between sex and gender, presenting the world of old age as one that is constructed of two circles, only partially congruent: the culture circle, defining old age in terms of stigma, expulsion and exclusion and the circle of the structured existence of the elders themselves. The interaction between the two circles is one of tension and acceptance. Hazan devotes most of his research to this interface, between culture and old age. He uses ethnographies to show how, regardless of the cultural "iron cage", the elderly manage to build their own existential enclaves as an alternative to a hostile, alienating society. However, these alternatives are not asylum cities for the oppressed refugees of society, but meaningful settings which include different ways of perceiving and interpreting reality, allowing their residents a meaningful life even after family, community and finance are no longer as they were.

=== The Limbo People: A Study of the Constitution of the Time Universe among the Aged ===
This is the title of Haim Hazan's first book, an adaptation of his doctorate paper. It was first published in English in 1980 and translated to Hebrew in 2002. Based on a research of Jews living in an impoverished district of London in their old age, the book is about the experience and conception of time among the elderly. The people in Hazan's research built themselves a cyclic, separate present, while erasing the past and the future. Through general reciprocal interactions, a joint bank of sorts where everyone gives what they can and withdraws according to their needs, the give-and-take relations are canceled out along with the conception of past and present.

=== A Paradoxical Community: The Emergence of a Social World in an Urban Renewal Setting ===
This book was published in 1990, investigating Project Renewal and offering a critical analysis of the rhetorical, social, institutional and local usages of the term 'community', which prevent investment in vital channels such as employment and education. Hazan tries to examine the qualities and characterizations of the term 'community', and the main argument in the book is that there is an inverse ratio between the common use of the term 'community' and the social structure of a community which includes social institutions and communal networks – the more one rises, the more the other declines, and vice versa.

=== Managing Change in Old Age: The Control of Meaning in an Institutional Setting ===
This book was published by New York State University in 1992. It is an ethnographic study of a retirement home in Tel Aviv, which examines the elders' adaptation to the rapid changes which occur in old age. Hazan studied various people, from the atheist Labor movement people to religious Jews who pray at the synagogue every day. He showed that despite the significant difference between them, the subjects devoted effort and imagination to forming a social space that denies the inevitable, stabilizes the present and allows the survival of meaning under conditions of constant existential threat. In his research, he even revealed a picture of Israeli society, where its center is the aging of the "founders' generation", ageless in its own mind.

=== Old Age: Construction and Deconstruction ===
This is a theoretical book, published by Cambridge University Press in 1994, where Hazan defined and summarized his findings from his various field researches. He tries to find out if we can understand old age, or if old age has a uniqueness we cannot know. In his opinion, the attempt to understand old age is prone to failure, and there is no correspondence between the language in which old people speak in their behavioral world to the language used by the academy or society – in cultural representation, imagery, myths and stereotypes – to speak of "the elderly". The problems with representation of time, space and meaning, caused by the gap between the two, are used as keys for the existing discourse between old people, without presuming to break into the uniqueness of the experience of aging.

=== From First Principles: An Experiment in Ageing ===
This book, published in 1996, is the product of the ethnographic field research Hazan conducted with 500 elderly people in Cambridge, England, who were part of the University of the Third Age. In this organization, elderly people volunteer to teach themselves and share their knowledge with others in their age group. They established a research committee for matters of old age, where they examined the representation of elderly people on television, for instance, but refused to deal with topics related to death, or what they called "The Fourth Age", meaning, sick, feeble elderly people. In his research, Hazan found that the elderly tend to develop a language of communication which separates the relationships between themselves and their relationships with the non-elderly world. They dismantled the categories of their lives, such as gender and family, in preparation for death, which could suddenly occur. They were not very sick, but healthy and active, and yet they were preparing for death by decomposing their world. They created shared myths of perennial, eternal now, through a discourse which was comprehensible only to them, thus developing a different, adaptive language of temporary, utilitarian relationships necessary for survival.

=== Stimulated Dreams: Israeli Youth and Virtual Zionism ===
This book, published in 2001, is about the communicative world of Israeli teenagers: their myths, cultural imagery and the temporal orientations. The main conclusion in the book is that the processes of globalization – with its post-modern characteristics – which lead Israeli society, actually intensify the local components of national identity. This is because global apparatuses, such as television and the internet, facilitate the rise of collective communities while cultivating and spreading the myths that constitute them.

=== Knowledge of Old Age: The Subject of Old Age in Socio-Anthropology Studies ===
A bibliographical guide that offers 12 curriculums for designated student populations, from high school students to potential researchers. All the curriculums offer the same spectrum of topics in various levels of accessibility.

=== Old Age as a Social Phenomenon ===
This book, published by The Broadcast University, presents the main points of the sociological-anthropological discourse of old age, as it deconstructs the main issues that constitute it and suggests a different coping method. The basic assumption of this critical approach is the distinction between the cultural constitution of old age and the elderly as human beings, and between what is considered pathological to what is perceived as normal. A comparative examination of the imagery of different stages of life in various societies challenges the universal assumptions regarding old age. There is special emphasis on the bond between death and old age, once the attitude towards both is determined.

=== The Anthropological Discourse ===
This book is an exposé of major trends and themes in social anthropology. Hazan offers an introduction to the main theoretical thrusts in the discipline. In a series of chapters, Hazan tracks down the process through which the key intellectual debates that form the anthropological discourse are developed and oscillate.

=== Assassination of Yitzhak Rabin ===
Hazan wrote a series of articles in Hebrew and English about the assassination of Yitzhak Rabin. In one of the articles, he contended that the identity of the killer would eventually become parallel to the identity of the victim; one could not exist without the other and the two identities would establish the Israeli discourse side-by-side. In another article, he wrote that the mourning ceremonies at Rabin Square after Rabin's death had become a pilgrimage site which exposed the three components of the national identity: 1. The global component – flowers and candles; 2. The Jewish component; 3. The Zionist component. As such, the (symbolic) body politic of Rabin consolidates these three components.

=== A Town at Sundown: Aging Nationalism in Jaffa ===
This book, coauthored by Dr. Daniel Monterescu and published in 2011, is about the connection between nationalism and the stories of Arab and Jewish elderly, a product of an ethnographic research conducted in Jaffa. The main argument in the book is that the more the distress of old age grows, the national plight and devotion to the national discourse lessens, both among Jews and Arabs.

A more theoretically elaborate English version of the book is forthcoming under the title: From Identity Politics to Politics of Existence in An Israeli Mixed City.

=== Against Hybridity: Social Impasses in a Globalizing World ===
One of the major characteristics of our contemporary culture is a positive, almost banal, view of the transgression and disruption of cultural boundaries. Strangers, migrants, and nomads are celebrated in our postmodern world of hybrids and cyborgs. But we pay a price for this celebration of hybridity: the non-hybrid figures in our societies are ignored, rejected, silenced, or exterminated. This book tells the story of these non-hybrid figures - the antiheroes of our pop culture. The main example of non-hybrids is an otherwise hybridized world is that of deep old age. Hazan shows how we fervently distance ourselves from old age by grading and sequencing it into stages such as the Third Age, the Fourth Age, and so on. Aging bodies are manipulated through anti-aging techniques until it is no longer possible to do it anymore, at which point they become un-transformable and non-marketable objects and hence commercially and socially invisible or masked. Other examples are used to elucidate the same cultural logic of the non-hybrid : pain, the Holocaust, autism, fundamentalism, and corporeal death. On the face of it, these examples may seem to have nothing in common, but they all exemplify the same cultural logic of the non-hybrid and provoke similar reactions of criticism, terror, abhorrence, and moral indignation.

This book offers a critique of contemporary western culture by focusing on that which is perceived as its other – the non-hybrid in our midst, often rejected, ignored, or silenced and deemed to be in need of globally manageable correction.

=== The Holocaust and Globalization ===
During the years 2006–2008, Hazan led a research group about the Holocaust and globalization at the Van Leer Jerusalem Institute. The results of the research were co-edited with Dr. Amos Goldberg in a volume entitled: Marking Evil: Holocaust Memory in the Global Age.

== Books ==
1. The Limbo People – A Study of the Constitution of the Time Universe Among The Aged, London, Routledge & Kegan Paul, 1980.
2. (An updated edition was published in Hebrew in 2003.)
3. Old Age as a Social Phenomenon, (Hebrew). Tel Aviv, Ministry of Defense publishing house, The Broadcast University, 1984.
4. Knowledge of Old Age: The Subject of Old Age in Socio-Anthropology Studies (Hebrew). Jerusalem, Academon, 1988
5. A Paradoxical Community, Greenwich, JAI Press, 1990.
6. Managing Change in Old Age: The Control of Meaning in an Institutional Setting, New York, State University Press of New York, 1992.
7. The Anthropological Exchange (Hebrew), Tel Aviv, Ministry of Defense publishing house, The Broadcast University, 1992.
8. Old Age: Constructions and Deconstructions, Cambridge, Cambridge University Press, 1994. Pages 28–38 reprinted in J. Gubrium and J. Holstein (eds.) Aging and Everyday life, Oxford: Blackwell, 2000, pp. 15–24.
9. From First Principles: An Experiment in Ageing, Westport, CT., Bergin & Garvey, 1996.
10. Simulated Dreams: Israeli Youth and Virtual Zionism. New York: Berghahn Books, 2001.
11. A Town at Sundown: Aging Nationalism in Jaffa (coauthored with Daniel Monterescu), (Hebrew). Van Leer Jerusalem Institute and Hakibbutz Hameuchad, 2011
12. Serendipity in Anthropological Research: The Nomadic Turn (Coedited with Esther Hertzog), London, Ashgate, 2012.
13. Marking Evil: Holocaust Memory in the Global Age, (Coedited with Amos Goldberg), New York, Berghahn Books, 2015.
14. Against Hybridity: Social Impasses in a Globalizing World, Cambridge, Polity, 2015.
15. Twilight Nationalism: From Identity Politics to Politics of Existence in an Israeli Mixed City, (coauthored With Daniel Monterescu), Stanford, Stanford University Press. (Forthcoming).
16. To Die in Israel: The Current State, (Coauthored with Shay Brill. Jiska Cohen-Mansfield and Shai Lavi) (Hebrew). Tel Aviv, Hakibbutz Hameuchad, (Forthcoming).
