= Thayer Scudder =

American anthropologist (1930–2026)

- Born: August 4, 1930; New Haven, Connecticut, U.S.
- Died: October 22, 2026 (aged 96)
- Education: Harvard University; London School of Economics
- Occupation: Anthropologist
- Employer: California Institute of Technology

Thayer Scudder (August 4, 1930 – October 22, 2026) an American social anthropologist, who was an anthropology professor emeritus at the California Institute of Technology.

== Life and career ==
Thayer Scudder was born in New Haven, Connecticut on August 4, 1930. Educated at Harvard University (AB 1952, PhD 1960), he did a postdoctorate in African Studies, Anthropology and Ecology at the London School of Economics, followed by positions with the Rhodes-Livingston Institute for Social Research in Northern Rhodesia 1956–1957 and again in 1962–1963, and a post at the American University in Cairo in 1961–1962. He joined the Caltech faculty in that year. His work on socioeconomic issues and infrastructure development associated with river basin development, forced relocation, and refugee reintegration made him a world leader in these fields. Large dams are one of the world's most controversial, divisive and expensive development issues, and Scudder is a leading expert on dams and relocation effects. His 2005 book "The Future of Large Dams" covers aspects of large dams and development including economics, politics, environmental risk, energy, agriculture, and human displacement and resettlement. He has undertaken studies on sustainable resource use in Africa, India, Nepal, Jordan, Indonesia, Malaysia, the Philippines, Sri Lanka, and the United States, and served on a number of independent review panels for dam projects in Africa and Asia. He was a former commissioner on the World Commission on Dams.

In addition to expertise and special interest in regional development, irrigated and rainfed agriculture, pioneer settlement, community-based natural resource management, and impacts of large-scale river basin development projects on low income populations, Scudder focused on systematic long-term studies of low income human communities. The most classic of his long-term studies was carried out with anthropologist Elizabeth Colson among the Gwembe Tonga of Zambia.

Author Jacques Leslie devotes a third of his narrative nonfiction book Deep Water: The Epic Struggle Over Dams, Displaced People, and the Environment (Farrar, Straus & Giroux, 2005) to a portrait of Scudder. The section includes a visit to the Zambian resettlement village where many Gwembe Tonga now live and follows Scudder as he inspects dam projects in Lesotho and Botswana.

Scudder died on October 22, 2026, at the age of 96.

== Publications ==
- “Development-induced Relocation and Refugee Studies: 37 years of change and continuity among Zambia’s Gwembe Tonga,” Journal of Refugees Studies, Vol 6 (2): 123-152 (1993)
- “Recent experiences with river basin development in the tropics and subtropics,” Natural Resources Forum 18(2): 101-113 (1994)
- Chapters on “Social Impacts” and “Resettlement” in Water Resources: Environmental Planning, Management and Development, edited by Asit K. Biswas, New York: McGraw Hill. (1997)
- “The World Commission on Dams and the Need for a New Development Paradigm,” International Journal of Water Resources Development Vol 17, No.3:329-341. (2000)
- The Future of Large Dams: Dealing with social, environmental, institutional and political costs. London: Earthscan. (2005)
- Global Threats, Global Futures: Living With Declining Living Standards. Cheltenham, Gloucter: Edward Elgar Publishing. (2010)

== See also ==
- Bronislaw Malinowski Award
