= Elizabeth Colson =

American social anthropologist (1917–2016)

- Born: June 15, 1917; Hewitt, Minnesota, U.S.
- Died: August 3, 2016 (aged 99); Monze, Zambia
- Education: University of Minnesota; Radcliffe College
- Known for: Study of the Gwembe Tonga
- Awards: American Association of University Women fellowship, (1942-1943); Lewis Henry Morgan Lecturer, University of Rochester (1973); AAA Distinguished Lecture (1975); Honorary Degrees, Brown University, University of Rochester; National Academy of Sciences (1977)
- Scientific career
- Fields: Social anthropology
- Doctoral advisor: Clyde Kluckhohn

Elizabeth Florence Colson (June 15, 1917 – August 3, 2016) was an American social anthropologist and professor emerita of anthropology at the University of California, Berkeley. She was best known for the classic long-term study of the Tonga people of the Gwembe Valley in Zambia and Zimbabwe, which she began in 1956 with Thayer Scudder, 11 years after she obtained her doctorate and while Scudder was a second-year graduate student. Colson focused her research on the consequences of forced resettlement on culture and social organization, the effects of economic pressure on familial relationships, rituals, religious life, and even drinking patterns.

== Biography ==
Colson was born in Hewitt, Minnesota on June 15, 1917. She received her bachelor's and master's degrees in anthropology from the University of Minnesota and her Ph.D. in Social Anthropology in 1945 from Radcliffe College. Her first experience with field work was at a field laboratory established by Burt and Ethel Aginsky. Colson received a fellowship from the American Association of University Women in 1942–1943. She was elected a member of the National Academy of Sciences in 1977 and a Fellow of the American Academy of Arts and Sciences in 1978. While at Radcliffe College, she experienced sex-discrimination in academia and would later work to eradicate this discrimination at the University of California. Her work was based on ethnography and focused on long-term, data supported research. Colson later became a Professor Emeritus at the University of California, Berkeley. She died in Monze, Zambia in August 2016 at the age of 99.

== Research ==
=== Gwembe Tonga Project ===
In 1956, Colson was sent by the Rhodes-Livingstone Institute to study the potential effects that the construction of a dam and hydro-electric power plant would have on the Gwembe Tonga of Northern Rhodesia (now Zambia). She partnered with Thayer Scudder in order to collect data on the residents of Gwembe. Colson then outlined the social reactions observed during the resettlement of the Gwembe Tonga in her project report titled "The Social Consequences of Resettlement, the Impact of Kariba Resettlement Upon the Gwembe Tonga". The reactions from the Gwembe expressed in Colson's report include: social upheaval, hostility towards the government, loss of legitimacy of local leaders who supported the resettlement of the Gwembe, increase of force on the part of the aforementioned leaders, and general instability in the Gwembe social structure.

This research directly contributed to the academic discussions of resettlement, migration, and refugee communities in applied and development anthropology. Colson's research with Scudder on the Gwembe and the social and political aspects of their resettlement is ongoing.

== Bibliography ==
- Autobiographies of Three Pomo Women. Archeological Research Facility. Department of Anthropology, University of California, Berkeley (1974).
