= J. Clyde Mitchell =

British sociologist and anthropologist

- Born: 21 June 1918; Pietermaritzburg, Natal Province, South Africa
- Died: 15 November 1995 (aged 77)
- Known for: Network analysis
- Scientific career
- Fields: Sociologist and anthropologist
- Institutions: University of Manchester

James Clyde Mitchell FBA (usually known as J. Clyde Mitchell; 21 June 1918 Pietermaritzburg – 15 November 1995) was a British sociologist and anthropologist.

In 1937 Mitchell helped found the Rhodes-Livingstone Institute group of social anthropologists/sociologists, now a part of the University of Zambia. He was influenced by Max Gluckman and conducted important research on social network analysis at the University of Manchester (see Manchester School). In the 1940s he carried out field research into social systems and social conditions in Central Africa (southern Malawi) interviewing heads of households in villages and urban areas and observing customs. In 1952 he was on the editorial committee of the Northern Rhodesia Journal.

Mitchell studied network analysis and was a founding member of the International Network for Social Network Analysis, contributing to its Connections magazine.

For a detailed story of his life refer to the following by Susan J. Smith: J. CLYDE MITCHELL James Clyde Mitchell 21 June 1918 – 15 November 1995 elected Fellow of the British Academy 1990 by SUSAN J. SMITH, Fellow of the academy

== Publications ==
- The Kalela dance: Aspects of social relationships among urban Africans in Northern Rhodesia, Manchester: Manchester University Press, 1956
- The Yao Village: a Study in the Social Structure of a Malawian Tribe Manchester: Manchester University Press, 1956, 1966, 1971
- Social Networks in Urban Situations: Analysis of Personal Relationships in Central African Towns Manchester: Manchester University Press, 1969
- Networks, Norms & Institutions, 1973
- Configurational Similarity in Three Class Contexts in British Society, in Sociology, Vol. 19, 1985
- Cities, Society, and Social Perception: A Central African Perspective 1987
