= Monica Wilson =

South African anthropologist (1908–1982)

- Born: Monica Hunter; 3 January 1908; Lovedale, Cape Colony
- Died: 28 September 1982 (aged 74); Hogsback, Cape Province, South Africa
- Citizenship: South African citizenship
- Education: Girton College, Cambridge
- Partner: Godfrey Wilson
- Children: Francis Wilson
- Scientific career
- Fields: Social Anthropology
- Workplaces: University of Cape Town
- Thesis: Reaction to Conquest
- Notable students: Archie Mafeje

Monica Wilson, née Hunter (3 January 1908 – 26 October 1982) was a South African anthropologist, who was professor of social anthropology at the University of Cape Town.

== Life ==
Monica Hunter was born to missionary parents in Lovedale in the Cape Colony, speaking Xhosa from childhood. She studied history at Girton College, Cambridge, before gaining a Cambridge doctorate in anthropology in 1934. Her thesis, the fieldwork for which was undertaken with the Pondo in the Eastern Cape between 1931 and 1933, was presented in the monograph Reaction to Conquest.

Marrying Godfrey Wilson in 1935, the pair undertook fieldwork with the Nyakyusa in Tanzania between 1935 and 1938. Their fieldwork was sponsored by the International African Institute, Godfrey Wilson died in 1944. Monica taught at the University College of Fort Hare from 1944 to 1946 and at Rhodes University from 1947 to 1951. She was Professor of Social Anthropology at the University of Cape Town from 1952 until retirement in 1973.

She died in Hogsback, Cape Province at her home, which is now a research centre for the University of Fort Hare.

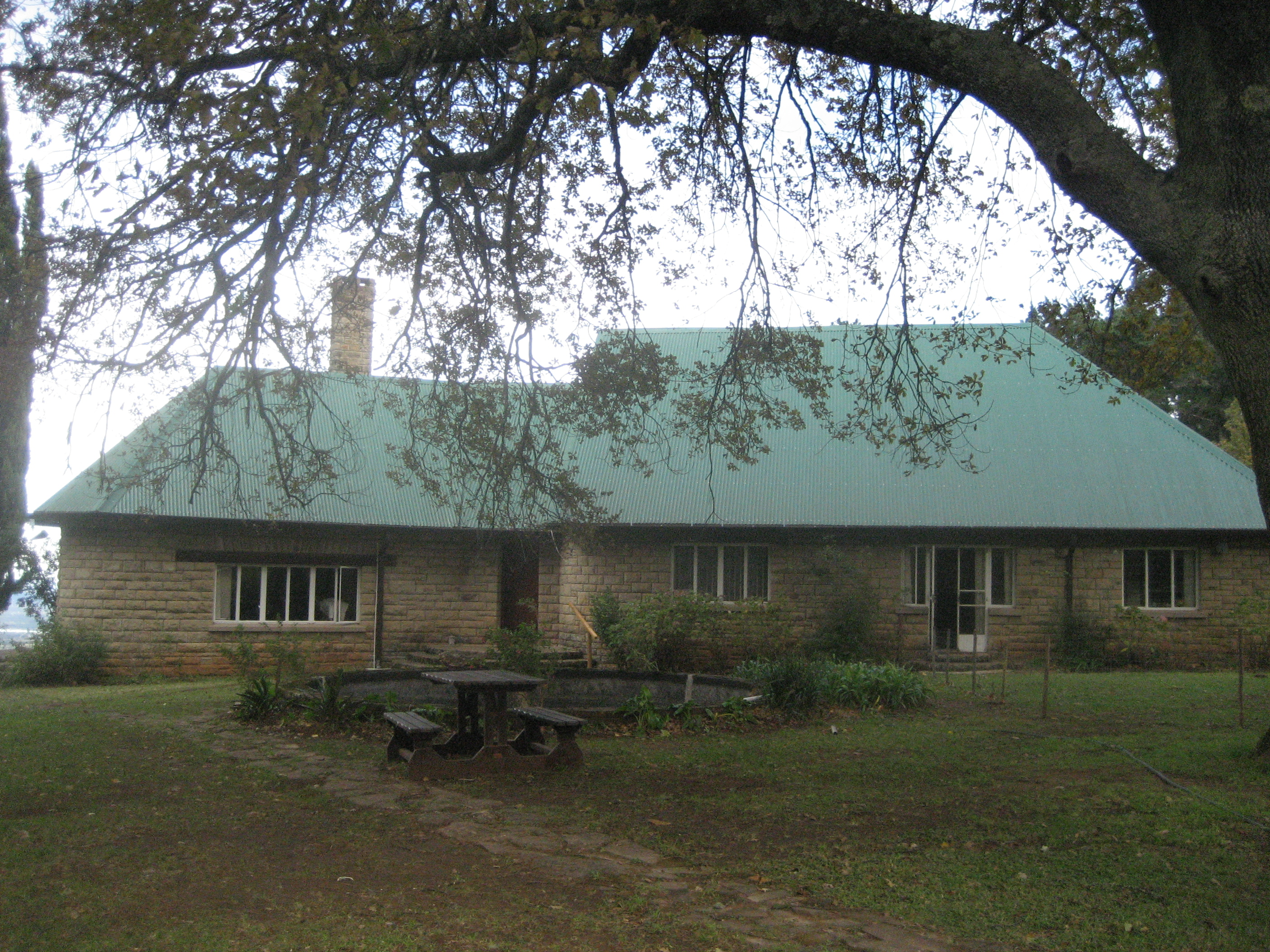
Monica Wilson's house in Hogsback

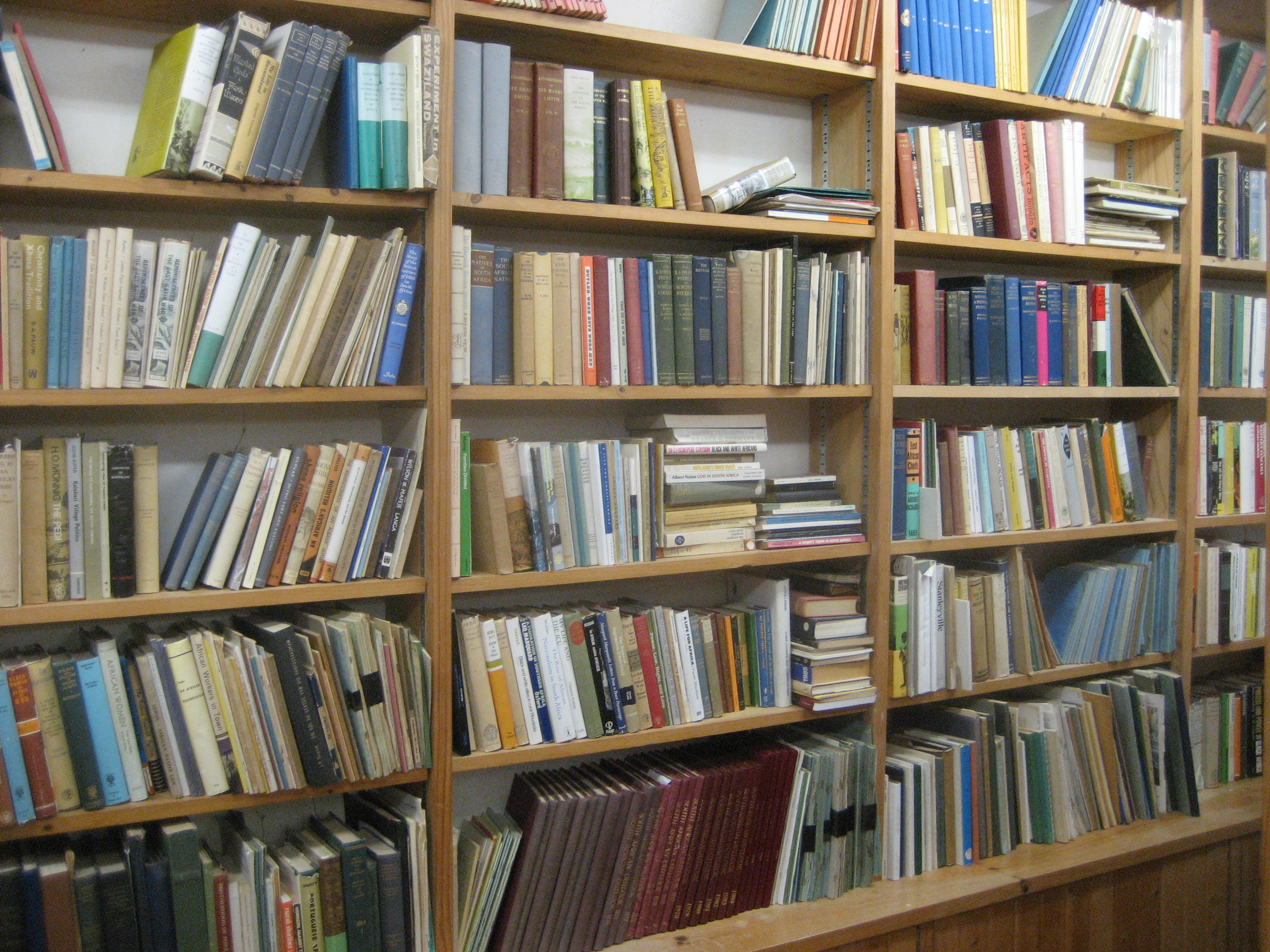
Library

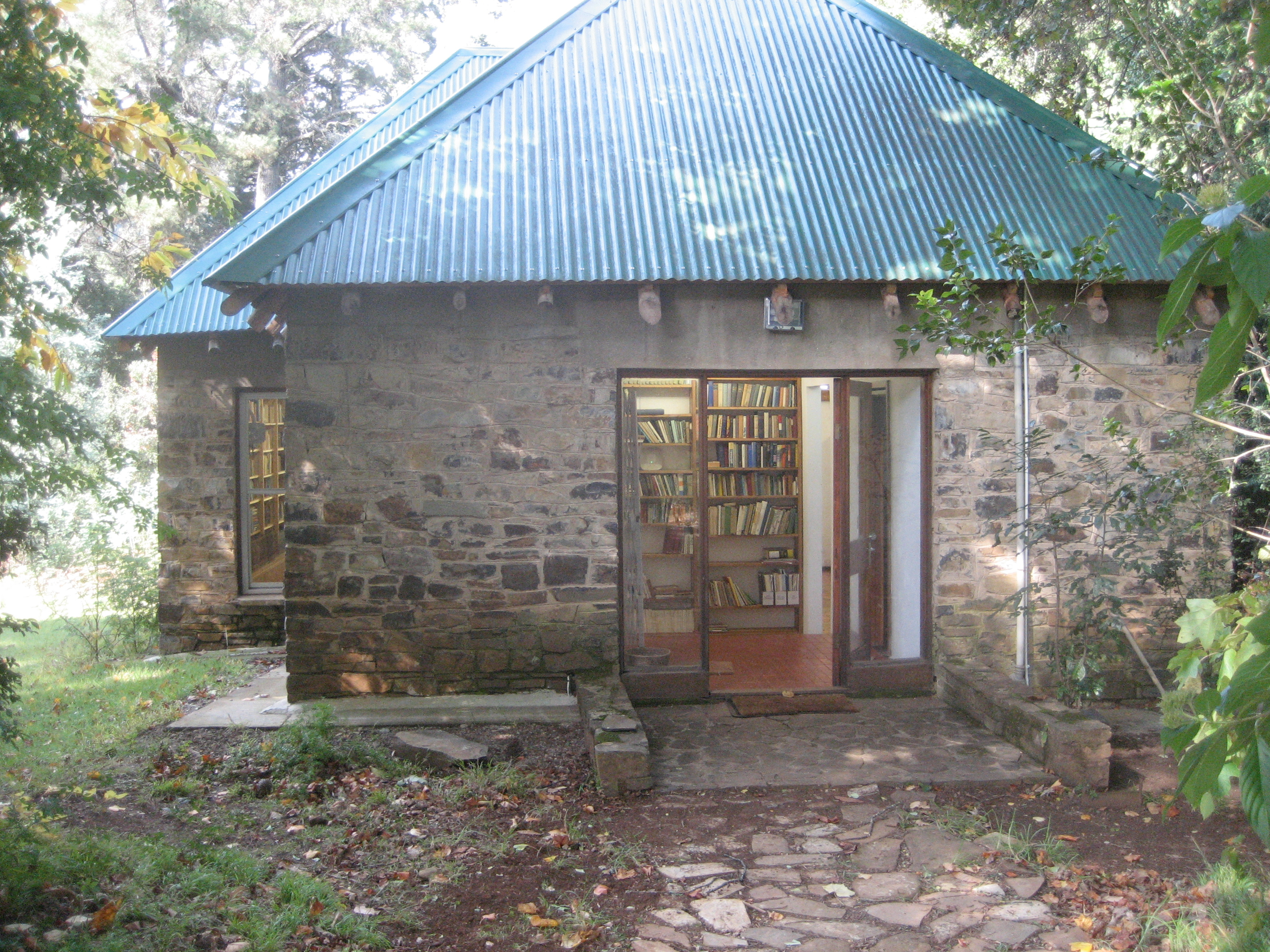
Library

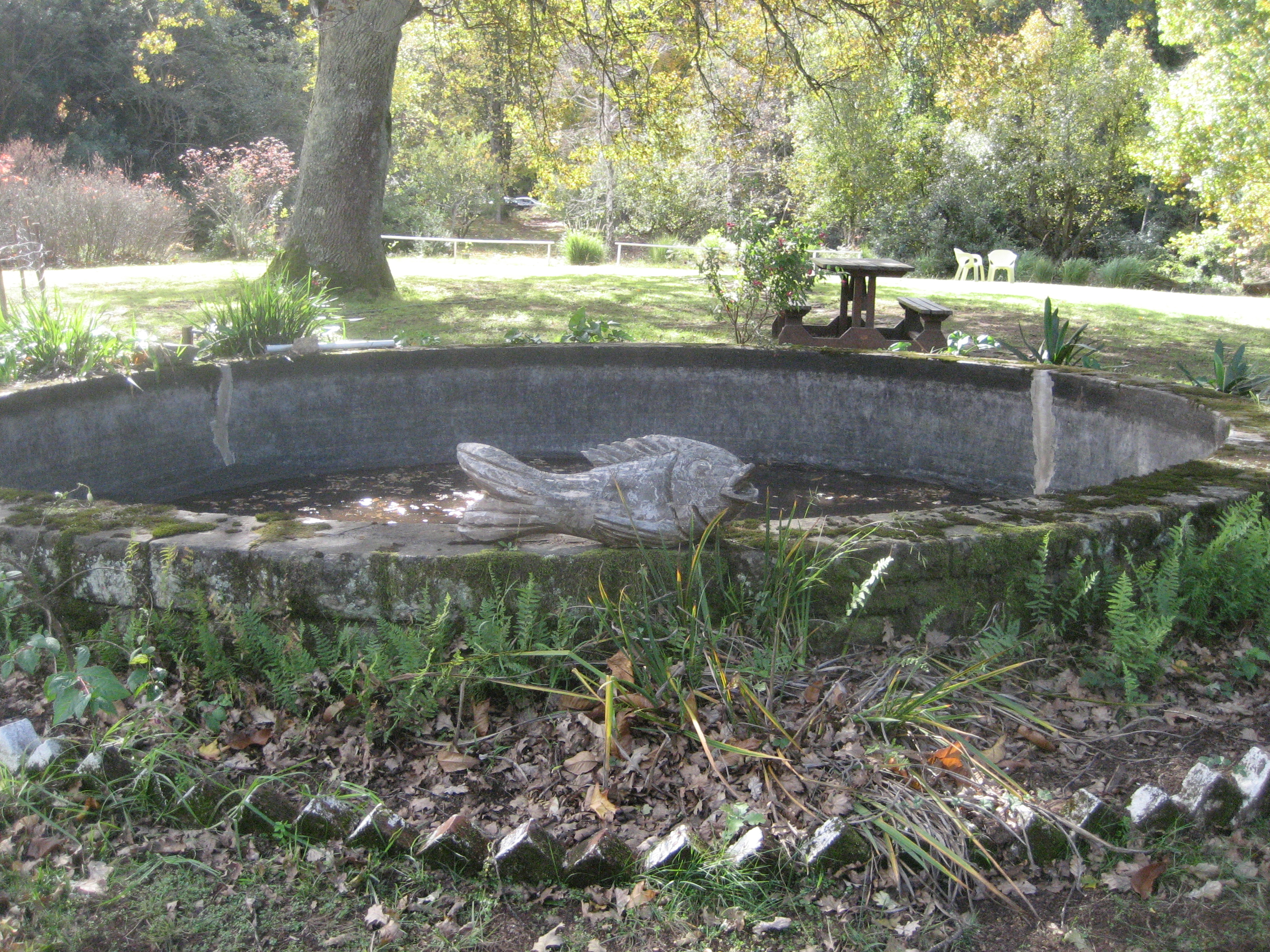
Pond (Hogsback)

== Works ==
- The Analysis of Social Change. CUP Archive. 1945. GGKEY:PQXPX24Z7XY. with Godfrey Wilson
- Good Company. A Study of Nyakyusa Age-villages. London. 1951.
- Rituals of Kinship Among the Nyakyusa. Oxford University Press. 1957.
- Communal Rituals of the Nyakyusa. Oxford University Press. 1959.
- Reaction to Conquest: Effects of Contact with European on the Pondo of South Africa. With an Introd. by General the Right Hon, J. C. Smuts. 2d Ed. Oxford University Press. 1964.
- The Oxford History of South Africa. Clarendon Press. 1971. ISBN 978-0-19-821641-4.(ed. with Leonard Thompson)
- For Men and Elders: Change in the Relations of Generations and of Men and Women Among the Nyakyusa – Ngonde People 1875–1971. Holmes & Meier. 1977. ISBN 9780841903135.
