= Rhodes-Livingstone Institute =

The Rhodes-Livingstone Institute (RLI) was the first local anthropological research facility in Africa; it was founded in 1937 under the initial directorship of Godfrey Wilson. It is located a few miles outside Lusaka. Designed to allow for easier study of the local cultures of Northern Rhodesia, now Zambia, it became the base of operations for a number of leading anthropologists of the time.

Among the participating anthropologists at the RLI, In addition to Wilson, were Monica Hunter Wilson, Max Gluckman, J. Desmond Clark, Elizabeth Colson, E.L. Epstein, J. Clyde Mitchell, and William Watson.

Others have called attention to what they regard as misguidedness on the part of the RLI anthropologists, stemming from the fact that they were embedded in the colonial system and blind to its reality as a component in dialectic study. Contrasting views are presented in a study by Lyn Schumaker (2001) and a chapter by Richard Brown (1973).

== Publications ==
The Institute published a series of papers:

- No. 1 - 1938 - The land rights of individuals among the Nyakyusa by Godfrey Wilson
- No. 2 - 1938 - The study of African society by Godfrey Wilson and Monica Hunter Wilson
- No. 3 - 1939 - The Constitution of Ngonde by Godfrey Wilson
- No. 4 - 1939 - ??
- No. 5 - 1941 - An Essay on the Economics of Detribalization in Northern Rhodesia - Part 1 by G.Wilson.
- No. 6 - 1942 - An Essay on the Economics of Detribalization in Northern Rhodesia - Part 2 by G.Wilson.
- No. 7 - 1941 - Economy of the Central Barotse Plain. By Max Gluckman.
- No. 8 - 1942 - Good out of Africa. By A. T. Culwick
- No. 9 - 1968 - The African as suckling and as adult. by J.F. Ritchie
- No. 10 - 1943 - Lozi Land Tenure
- No. 12 - 1946 - Fishermen of the Bangweulu Swamps
- No. 13 - 1948 - Rooiyard by Ellen Hellmann.
- No. 18 - ???? - Gusii Bridewealth: Law and Custom by Philip Mason
- No. 20 - 1951 - Marriage in a changing society by J.A. Barnes
- No. 21 - 1951 - ? on the Luapula
- No. 22 - 1953 - Accommodating the spirit amongst some North-Eastern Shona tribes by J.F. Holleman
- No. 26 - 1956 - A Social Survey of the African Population of Livingstone. by Merran McCulIoch.
- No. 30 - 1961 - [unreadable]

Also a series of Occasional Papers
