= Max Gluckman =

South African anthropologist (1911–1975)

- Herman Max Gluckman
- Born: 26 January 1911; Johannesburg
- Died: 13 April 1975 (aged 64)
- Education: University of the Witwatersrand; University of Oxford
- Known for: Conflict theories
- Spouse: Mary Gluckman
- Scientific career
- Fields: Social anthropologist
- Workplaces: Manchester school

Herman Max Gluckman (/ˈɡlʌkmən/; 26 January 1911 – 13 April 1975) was a South African and British social anthropologist. He is best known as the founder of the Manchester School of anthropology.

== Biography and major works ==
Gluckman was born in Johannesburg in 1911. Like many of the other anthropologists he later worked with, he was Jewish. He was educated at the University of the Witwatersrand, where he obtained a BA in 1930. Although he intended to study law, he became interested in anthropology and studied under Winifred Hoernle. He earned the equivalent of an MA at Witwatersrand in 1934 and then received a Rhodes Scholarship to attend Exeter College, Oxford.

At Oxford, Gluckman's work was supervised by R.R. Marett, but his biggest influences were Radcliffe-Brown and Edward Evan Evans-Pritchard, who were proponents of structural functionalism. Gluckman conducted his Ph.D. research in Barotseland with the Lozi. In 1939 he joined the Rhodes-Livingstone Institute and in 1941 became its director. He developed the institute into a major center for anthropological research, and continued to maintain close connections there after he moved to England in 1947 to take up a lectureship at Oxford. In 1949, Gluckman became professor of anthropology at the University of Manchester, founding the department there.

Later, he worked under the British Administration in Northern Rhodesia (esp. on the Barotse law, in what is now the Western Province, Zambia). He directed the Rhodes-Livingstone Institute (1941–1947), before becoming the first professor of social anthropology at the University of Manchester (1949), where he founded what became known, including many of his Rhodes-Livingstone Institute colleagues along with his students, as the Manchester school of anthropology. One feature of the Manchester School that derives from Gluckman's early training in law was the emphasis on "case studies" involving analysis of instances of social interaction to infer rules and assumptions. He was widely known for his radio lectures on Custom and Conflict in Africa (later published in many editions at Oxford University Press), being a remarkable contribution to conflict theory.

Gluckman was a political activist, openly and forcefully anti-colonial. He engaged directly with social conflicts and cultural contradictions of colonialism, with racism, urbanisation and labour migration. Gluckman combined the British school of structural-functionalism with a Marxist focus on inequality and oppression, creating a critique of colonialism from within structuralism. In his research on Zululand in South Africa, he argued that the African and European communities formed a single social system, one whose schism into two racial groups formed the basis of its structural unity.

Bruce Kapferer described Gluckman as "perhaps the anthropologist par excellence whose own personal life, history and consciousness not only embodied some of the critical crises of the modern world but also demanded that the anthropology he imagined should confront and examine them" (in "The Crisis in Anthropology" on the occasion of the first Max Gluckman Memorial lecture.)

Gluckman was of considerable influence on several anthropologists and sociologists Lars Clausen, Ronald Frankenberg, Bruce Kapferer, J. Clyde Mitchell, Victor Turner, Johan Frederik Holleman, and other students and interlocutors. Most of them came to be known as the "Manchester School". Richard Werbner, along with his wife Pnina (Gluckman's niece), assumed the role of continuing Gluckman's legacy at the Manchester school after his 1975 death.

== Books ==
- Rituals of Rebellion in South-East Africa (1954)
- Order and Rebellion in Tribal Africa (London: Cohen and West; 1963)
- Politics, Law and Ritual in Tribal Society (1965)
- The Allocation of Responsibility (1972)
