= Marcel Granet =

French sociologist, ethnologist and sinologist

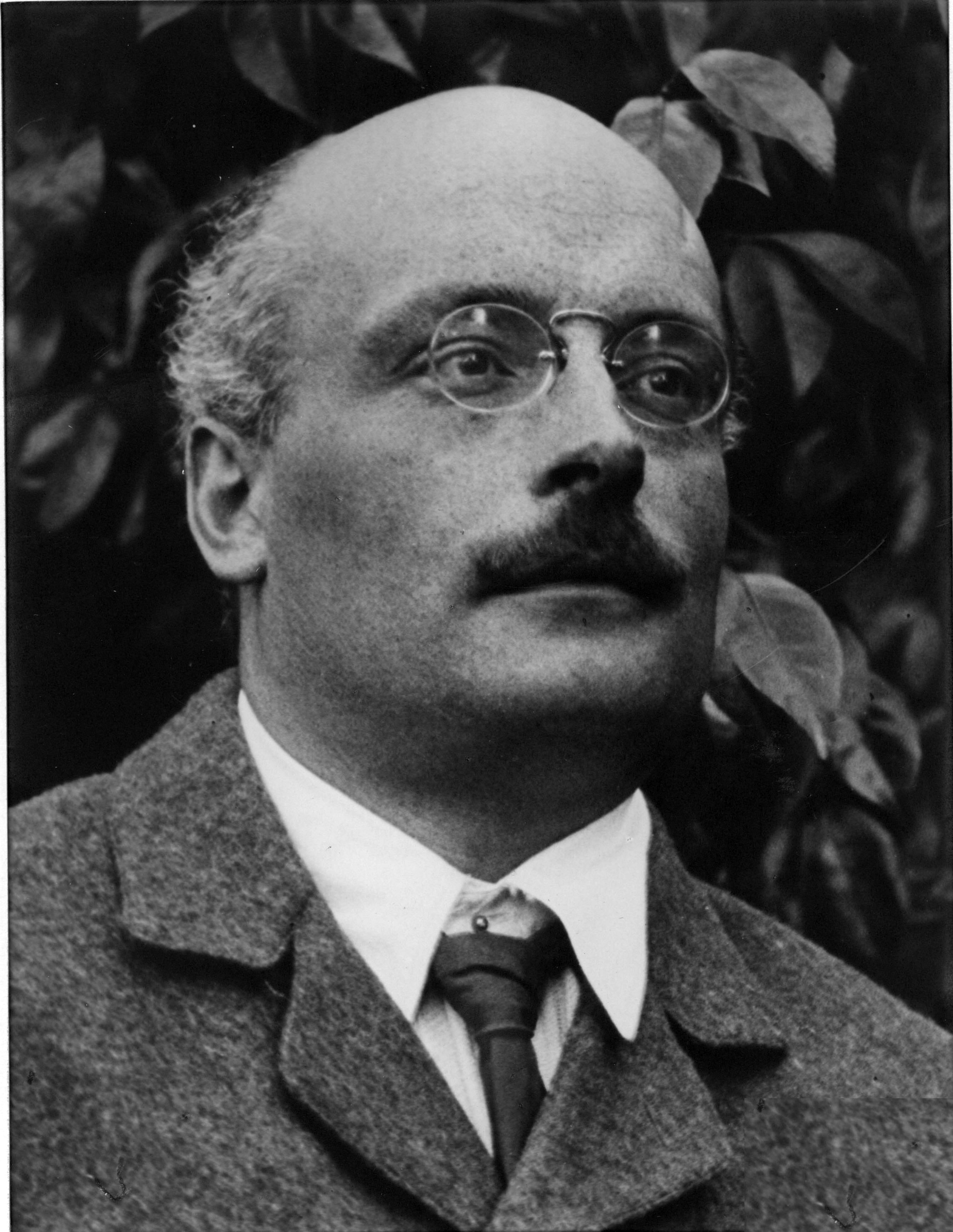
- Marcel Granet
- Born: 29 February 1884; Luc-en-Diois, France
- Died: 25 November 1940 (aged 56); Sceaux, Hauts-de-Seine, France
- Scientific career
- Fields: Sinology

Chinese name
- Traditional Chinese: 葛蘭言
- Simplified Chinese: 葛兰言
Transcriptions
Standard Mandarin
- Hanyu Pinyin: Gé Lányán
- Wade–Giles: Kê^{2} Lan^{2}-yen^{2}

Marcel Granet (French: [ɡʁanɛ]; 29 February 1884 – 25 November 1940) was a French sociologist, ethnologist and sinologist. As a follower of Émile Durkheim and Édouard Chavannes, Granet was one of the first to bring sociological methods to the study of China. Granet was revered in his own time as a sociological sinologist, or sinological sociologist, and member of the Durkheimian school of sociology.

== Biography ==
Granet was born in Luc-en-Diois (Drôme), France. His father was an engineer, and his grandfather, a landowner. He attended lycée at Aix-en-Provence and then at the prestigious Lycée Louis-le-Grand in Paris, which traditionally attracted bright students striving to gain entrance to the École Normale Supérieure in Paris.

Granet passed the baccalauréat examination and entered the École Normale in 1904, just as the tumultuous Dreyfus Affair was coming to a close and the French educational system was changing. The École Normale was reunited with the University of Paris at the Sorbonne in 1903, and the former's students, called normaliens, took classes at the Sorbonne with University students. Émile Durkheim, the sociologist and founder of Année Sociologique in 1898, who would greatly influence the life and work of Granet, began teaching a course on pedagogy at the Sorbonne—it was compulsory for all students from 1904 until 1913. Therefore, Granet first became introduced to Durkheim and his theories during his first year at the École.

At the École Normale, Granet embraced philosophy, law, and history, along with sociology, though his work in any field would adopt a Durkheimian character. He became part of an elite group of students which included future medieval historian and founder of the Annales school of history Marc Bloch, the geographer Philippe Arbos, sociologist Georges Davy, Hellenist and future librarian of the École Normale Paul Étard, mathematician Paul Lévy, and more. In 1905, Granet joined a socialist study group whose membership included Durkheimian sociologist, anthropologist, major contributor to the Année and nephew of Durkheim himself, Marcel Mauss; future ancient Greek specialist and editor of Année Louis Gernet; and future Durkheimian sociologist, philosopher and contributor to Année, Maurice Halbwachs.

After earning his agrégation in history in 1907, Granet was appointed to teach history at a lycée at Bastia, on the island of Corsica. In 1908, he received a grant through the Fondation Thiers to pursue research on feudalism. He apparently spoke to Lucien Herr—the librarian of the École Normale from 1888 to 1926 who was associated with Durkheim and his students, and who was active in the socialist movement and the Dreyfus Affair—who advised Granet, when the latter thought of considering the Japanese case, to seek the advice of respected sinologist Edouard Chavannes, then apparently the nearest Granet could get in Paris to an expert on Japan. Chavannes in turn counseled Granet to begin with Chinese as the necessary first step towards Japanese studies, warning him that he would get entangled in Chinese, never to reach Japanese.

Granet spent three years at Thiers, working alongside fellow pensioners Bloch and Louis Gernet, both former normaliens. Granet's own work on feudalism, often framed in Durkheimian sociological theory, apparently influenced and oriented the work of Bloch and Gernet, in particular Bloch's interest in rites and myths.

In 1911, Granet published his first work, a socialist pamphlet titled "Contre l'alcoolisme, un programme socialiste," and that same year, left the Fondation Thiers upon receiving a grant from the French government to study classical Chinese texts in China. Interest in the country was high at the time. In Beijing (then known in anglophone countries as "Peking"), he met the Frenchman André d'Hormon who possessed great knowledge of Chinese and Chinese scholars. In 1912 Granet sent Chavannes a paper, "Coutumes matrimoniales de la Chine antique" upon the latter's request, which Chavannes submitted for publication in the T'oung Pao, a major sinological journal. In March of that year, Granet was caught in the middle of the 1911 Revolution, as the Republic of China was replacing the Qing dynasty. Granet wrote to friends at home, "We pack up: the twenty-four historians, in their frail cases, decorated with green characters, make a shaky structure. The Année Sociologique is in my hand bag. I stuff my suitcases." (Freedman)

Upon returning from China in 1913, Granet earned a teaching position in the history department at the Lycée de Marseille in March, and in October, at the Lycée de Montpellier. In December, he replaced Chavannes as Directeur d'Études pour les religions d'Extrême-Orient at the École Pratique des Hautes Études, after Chavannes resigned his post.

Like most men of his era, and of his promotion, Granet served in World War I from 1914 to 1918, earning the Croix de Guerre. He stayed briefly in Beijing in 1918 while on a mission there. Throughout the war he continued his studies of China and worked on two doctoral theses.

In 1919, Granet returned to France and in June, married Marie Terrien, after which he resumed his academic life. In January 1920, he was examined for his doctorate, the jury for which included the British anthropologist Sir James Frazer. In 1922, upon a request from Maurice Solovine to write a short book for the series "science et civilization," Granet composed La religion des Chinois (The Religion of the Chinese People) in six weeks while traveling back and forth between Paris and Tonnerre (Yonne), where his wife taught at a lycée and cared for their infant son. In December 1922, Granet replaced Mauss, when the latter scalded his foot, as a member of the committee for Georges Davy's thesis, "The Swearing of Faith," and subsequently published harsh criticism of it in the Journal de Psychologie Normale et Pathologie.

Acknowledging the decline of Année following Durkheim's death in 1917, several Durkheimians met in March 1923 in Paris to design a plan to resuscitate the journal. Also in attendance at the meeting were Henri Hubert, Henri and Lucien Lévy-Bruhl, and Mauss. Granet was to work on the sections of religious sociology and legal sociology. In 1925, he was named professor of geography, history, and institutions of the Far East at the École Nationale des Langues Orientales Vivantes, and in 1926, helped to establish the Institut des Hautes Études Chinoises. From then on, he acted there as administrator and professor of Chinese and Chinese civilization.

Two years after his friend and colleague Mauss became president of the fifth section of religious science at l'École Pratique, Britain declared war on Germany, and in 1940, Granet replaced his friend upon the latter's resignation. Mauss, of Jewish heritage, sought to "safeguard the interests" of the school. (Fournier)

One month later, after the defeat of the French Republic, Granet died at Sceaux, outside Paris, at the age of 56. Mauss had considered Granet "one of [his] best and most beloved friends." (Fournier)

== Evaluation ==
As a teacher, Granet, "a bristling and cantankerous disputant, a rich mind powerfully stimulating those of others" (Gille) apparently instructed his students to "read slowly and always slowly." According to one student, Polish sinologist Witold Jablonski, Granet did "not care for popularity": "He is a scholar, he is a thinker, sometimes, perhaps, a wizard." (Jablonski) The sinologist shared his commitment to learning the language of the texts he studied, and analyzing all materials, whether primary or secondary, critically. He divided his teaching into the mythique and the juridique (the latter primarily consisting of rights and duties of kinship and marriage), though he did not necessarily succeed in eliciting in his students the same enthusiasm he possessed for both areas simultaneously. Among his students were also Korean-Japanese Itsuo Tsuda, who developed the école de la respiration and several future sinologists. Granet's work, meanwhile, brought Durkheimian sociology into the classical Chinese realm, from his analysis of the Book of Odes to a sociological study of Chinese numerology. Although he is remembered as a significant figure of both Durkheimian sociology and French sinology, his two roles are rarely recognized or thoroughly understood in tandem.

On the other side, Marcel Granet faced significant criticism from both Sinologists and sociologists for his approach to ancient Chinese society. Critics argued that his speculative interpretations often overreached the textual evidence, prioritizing sociological theory at the expense of historical accuracy. For example, Norman Girardot considered that:

"Granet has often been condemned by Sinologists as too much of a poetic generalist and by sociologists as too much of a narrow specialist. And it is true that his special genius was to fall between the two camps by respecting both philological limits and interpretive breadth. Granet was an artisan of texts who sometimes "gambled" with his speculative conclusions, and there is no doubt that much of his work on Chinese religion and society must be discarded or at least drastically revised. "

Claude Lévi-Strauss acknowledged Granet's influence but critiqued his reliance on an "Australian system" as a comparative framework, deeming the contextual assumptions "extremely doubtful" and his opposition of peasant customs to feudal rites unconvincing. Lévi-Strauss drew on emerging Chinese sociological research to highlight these flaws, noting Granet's hypotheses lacked sufficient grounding in specialized contemporary studies. Granet's dismissal of traditional Chinese commentators as "limited philologists incapable of observation" drew ire, as did his interpretations of texts like the Shijing, which some viewed as overly reliant on late commentaries and youthful verve rather than exhaustive evidence. Despite that cricisim, some view Granet's own approach prefigured structuralist theory.

Later scholars associated him with an Orientalist tendency to posit a holistic "Chinese mind" distinct from the West, particularly in his treatment of yin-yang dynamics as hierarchical pairs tied to gender and power. His ideas of quantity were deemed incorrect, based on the problematic idea of a single "Chinese Mind". The Chinese scholar Ding Wenjiang accused Granet of ahistoricity in his combining materials from different periods; Robert Merton objected that actual practices in China don't agree to what Granet describes. Michael Puett considered that the French sociologist confused the particular cosmology of the Han Dynasty as representative of the entire history of Chinese Thought. Henderson regarded that his sociological assumptions led him to make unsubstantiated claims about cosmology. Harbsmeier points to the error of Granet saying that the Chinese didn't have an abstract notion of space and time, and particularly that his entire book claims to understand their conception of those concepts but don't have a single reference to the terms 宇) (yuzhou) that actually mean space and time. In his volume in the Needham series, Harbsmeier also points to the lack of understanding of Granet of Chinese Language.

Despite its criticism, Granet's influence was vast, long lasting and very positive. Recently, some Chinese anthropologists like Wang Mingming has been more kinder to the approach that he proposed a century ago.

== Bibliography ==
=== Essays ===
- "Contre l'alcoolisme, un programme socialiste," 1911
- "Coutumes matrimoniales de la Chine antique", 1912
- "La polygynie sororale et sororat dans la Chine féodale", 1920
- "Quelques particularités de la langue et de la pensée chinoises", 1920
- "La vie et la mort. Croyances et doctrines de l'antiquité chinoise"
- "Le dépôt de l'enfant sur le sol, Rites anciens et ordalies mythiques", 1922
- "Le langage de la douleur, d'après le rituel funéraire de la Chine classique", 1922
- "Remarques sur le Taoïsme ancien", 1925
- "L'esprit de la religion chinoise", 1929
- "La droite et la gauche en Chine", 1933
- "Catégories matrimoniales et relations de proximité dans la chine ancienne", 1939
- "Etudes sociologiques sur la Chine", 1953

=== Major works ===
- Fêtes et chansons anciennes de la Chine, 1919 ("To the memory of Emile Durkheim and Edouard Chavannes.")
- La religion des Chinois, 1922 (The Religion of the Chinese People ISBN 978-0-06-131905-1)
- Danses et légendes de la Chine ancienne, 1926 (dedicated to Marcel Mauss)
- La civilisation chinoise, 1929
- La pensée chinoise, 1934
- La féodalité chinoise, 1952
