= Archaeology of trade =

Sub-discipline of archaeology

The archaeology of trade and exchange is a sub-discipline of archaeology that identifies how material goods and ideas moved across human populations. The terms “trade” and “exchange” have slightly different connotations: trade focuses on the long-distance circulation of material goods; exchange considers the transfer of persons and ideas.

One part of archaeology considers pre-modern societies. Markets, currency, craft production, ownership and concepts such as buying and selling had different meanings in those societies. Earlier economies were strongly defined by religious, ethnic and geographic constraints. Exchange could be used to strengthen social bonds instead of creating wealth. The archaeology of trade therefore includes the transfer of ideas and social practices in addition to the exchange of physical goods.

The archaeology of trade and exchange considers how trade influenced social development and power structures.

== Influences on ancient trade and exchange ==
The theory and practice of the archaeology of trade and exchange have been influenced by several important schools of thought.

== Political economy ==
The field of political economy deals with the interplay between political institutions and economic activity. This interdisciplinary field has contributions from economics, political science and sociology. Archaeologists who study political economy focus on how political structure, leadership and administration affect economic activity and how the economy can affect the strength and organization of political institutions.

== Economic anthropology ==
Economic anthropology is the study of the social context of economic transactions to explore the varied connections between culture and economy. Fields of research in economic anthropology include exchange, gift-giving and forms of currency. The study of economic anthropology also includes non-capitalist societies.

Important contributors to the field are listed below.

=== Karl Marx ===
Philosopher and economist Karl Marx influenced the fields of political economy and economic anthropology. His ideas on labor, modes and means of production and social class related to the frameworks used to understand the creation and exercise of power. Anthropologists used Marx’s ideas to provide perspective on archaeological and anthropological data. Marx’s theories on how the production and consumption of goods relate to social and political power were useful to those studying the evolution of trade and exchange in ancient societies.

=== Karl Polanyi ===
Karl Polanyi, a 20th-century economic theorist, introduced the idea of substantivism. Substantivism argues that economies operate within distinct cultural contexts, rather than operating separately from culture. Polanyi introduced concepts to economic anthropology that remain important to describe the movements of goods and their link to power: reciprocity, redistribution and exchange.

=== Marcel Mauss and Bronislaw Malinowski ===
Bronisław Malinowski (The Argonauts of the Western Pacific) and Marcel Mauss (The Gift: Forms and Means of Archaic Exchange) contributed to economic anthropology on gift-giving. They independently studied its economics and the social and political importance, especially in non-capitalist cultures. Their work is important in the study of ancient trade and exchange as a reminder of the significance and complexity of the movement of goods in non-capitalist societies.

=== George Dalton ===
Anthropologist George Dalton contributed to the early study of trade and exchange in non-capitalistic systems through his work on “primitive economies.” Dalton took part in a debate begun by Polanyi regarding “formal” versus “substantive” meanings of economy. The “formal” economy involves the mechanisms of trade and exchange based on rational decision-making, whereas the “substantive” economy is the process by which individuals subsist.

== Approaches for studying the archaeology of trade ==
Approaches taken to the study of the archaeology of trade and exchange can be organized in three groups: the scalar approach (focusing on a particular level of interaction); the examination of different types of trade; or through the study of a particular phase of the economy (such as production).

=== Scalar approaches ===
==== Global scale ====
World-systems theory and network theory are commonly used analytical tools that study global trade and exchange.

In the 1970s, Immanuel Wallerstein proposed World-systems theory to study the unequal relationships between developed “core” countries and underdeveloped “periphery” countries. Because of its strong analytical power in connecting societies under a comprehensive framework, world-systems theory was adapted by both anthropologists and archaeologists, who used it to study ancient societies (even though Wallerstein himself never agreed to this). Christopher Chase-Dunn and Thomas D. Hall apply the model to a range of human societies, from sedentary forager hamlets to the capitalist global system.

Network theory attempts to make sense of individual objects within a broad web of connection with other objects. In the 1950s, social scientists used this theory as a quantitative method for more accurate social analysis. This was known as social network theory and focused on the contact patterns of individuals and social groups. The connections between entities are “mapped out” to show the frequency and strength of connections across space and time, demonstrating the relative importance of various nodes.

==== Regional scale ====
Regional approaches to trade and exchange generally take a meso-scalar focus: at the inter-regional (between) and the intra-regional (within) levels. Various approaches are used in both descriptive and explanatory frameworks of social systems and their transformation. These include peer polity interaction, interaction spheres, social network analysis and modified core-periphery models of Wallerstein’s world-systems theory. Peer polity interaction (PPI) was introduced by Colin Renfrew and John F. Cherry. PPI posits that regional interaction and competition can be drivers for social change. Polities, “the highest order sociopolitical unit in the region in question,” are considered autonomous from one another socio-politically, even though they may share aspects of trade, art, architecture and/or ideology. Through PPI, adjacent polities adopt or develop similar aspects of social complexity and archaeologists study how institutional features develop and how they are adopted. Interaction Spheres, developed by Joe Caldwell in 1964, examines how independent societies within and across regions could coherently interact within different institutional frameworks. Caldwell used the mortuary and ritual practices of the Hopewell culture of North America as a prime example of an interaction sphere. Like PPI, Interaction Spheres argues that interaction among different regional groups may leads to innovation in cultural traditions.

=== Local scale (household) ===
Trade between households and trade within communities are both “local” scales of analysis that can play a major role in shaping both domestic economies and large-scale systems. Ordinary goods—often produced at the household-level—are a significant part of community sustainability. Moreover, the local economy may consume most of the daily activities for a community, thereby defining the identity of many ancient peoples. Study of the local economy may also highlight the role of marginalized groups (gender, class, etc.) that may have a significant impact in the economy. The study of household-level production and trade may also be used to extrapolate larger systems of trade and exchange.

== Types of trade ==
Staple or adornment goods move between individuals of the same or different groups by multiple modes. Those modes include those identified by Polanyi (reciprocity, redistribution and exchange) and market exchange.

=== Reciprocity ===
In cultural anthropology, reciprocity is the non-market exchange of goods or labor ranging from barter to gift exchange. The act of giving creates a tacit commitment to provide a service or object in return at some future time.

=== Redistribution ===
Redistribution concerns the distribution of power within a society. Within a chiefdom, the chief accumulates goods and resources from the population to later redistribute them according to local custom.

=== Exchange ===
Exchange and—more significantly—market exchange involves specific places (marketplaces) where goods and services can be negotiated and purchased. Archaeologists argue that evidence reveals market exchange in pre-Industrial societies such as the Prehistoric Hohokam, the Aztecs and the Maya. Market economies have involved signature features such as commodities, set prices and regulating institutions.

== Trade as a process ==
The production, circulation and consumption of goods provide another way that ancient trade and exchange can be studied. Production concerns the activity by which ideas are materialized in utilitarian and ritual goods. In archaeology, production is most often associated with either the sources of specific materials or labor specialization. Circulation is the flow of products from the source or the place of manufacture toward locations with sufficient demand for that product. Consumption is the acquisition and use of products. These three components of the commodity chain may be studied separately or in tandem.

== Techniques ==
=== Sourcing ===
Sourcing involves identifying the characteristic properties of the raw materials used to fashion items in order to determine the original material source of an artifact. It helps to determine social, political and economic connections among groups. Pinpointing the locations of sources helps archaeologists analyze the distribution range of goods and/or commodities. In order for sourcing to be effective, something must distinguish the material source from similar sources. For materials such as obsidian, determining the source can be easy; while for others, such as flint and some metals, it is more difficult. Moreover, not all materials can provide good data for sourcing, such as organic remains. Analytical methods used for sourcing may include:

- Optical emission spectrometry, OES
- Neutron activation analysis, NAA
- Atomic absorption spectroscopy AAS
- X-ray fluorescence XRF
- PIXE - particle induced x-ray emission
- Electron microprobe
- X-ray diffraction
- Cathodoluminescence
- Raman spectroscopy

=== Agent-based modeling ===
Agent-based modeling (ABM) is the simulation of agents (humans and social systems) based on a series of specified inputs. It models how humans (agents) and societies respond to inputs and stresses. For example, archaeologists working on social interactions in the Roman world used ABM to understand how social exchange affected the development of Roman expansionism in different regions. Elsewhere, archaeologists working on human subsistence mechanisms modeled how economics affected social complexity in Eastern North America.

=== Geographic information systems ===
Geographic information systems (GIS) provide an environment to model and measure the conditions by which spatial relationships develop and change. GIS software serves as an important tool to visualize such metrics. In Mexico, archaeologists used GIS models to examine transportation corridors between sites that prove useful in learning about trade relationships among polities through time. Archaeologists working in the Caribbean used GIS to model cultural landscapes to assess cultural and economic change in plantation societies. In the South American Andes, archaeologists used GIS to understand the exchange of goods and ideologies of Chavín De Huantar.
