= Paul Fauconnet =

French sociologist

Paul Fauconnet (March 13, 1874 in Saint-Denis – 1938) was a French sociologist who is best known as a contributor to the L'Année Sociologique.

== Biography ==
Fauconnet aggregated in philosophy in 1892 and earned his doctorate in philosophy in 1895. He also earned a further doctorate in law in 1920, although his interest in the law was purely scholarly and he never practiced as a lawyer. He became a professor at the faculty of letters in 1907 at the University of Toulouse and later chargé de cours (lecturer) at the faculty of letters in 1921 in Paris, obtaining a chair in 1932. His dissertation was entitled La responsabilité: Etude de sociologie (Paris: Alcan, 1920; 2nd edn 1928). It adopts and develops Emile Durkheim's teachings on the nature of criminal justice and punishment.

Durkheim's definition of sociology as "the science of institutions, of their genesis and functioning" was derived from Fauconnet's contribution on sociology, coauthored with Marcel Mauss, to La Grande Encyclopédie in 1901.

== Further reference ==
- Roger Cotterrell, Emile Durkheim: Law in a Moral Domain (Edinburgh: Edinburgh University Press / Stanford: Stanford University Press, 1999) pp. 106–109.
