= Hecato =

Hecato may refer to:

- Hecato of Rhodes, a Stoic philosopher
- hecato (unit prefix), an archaic metric unit prefix
