= Octave Hamelin =

French philosopher

Octave Hamelin (French: [amlɛ̃]; 22 July 1856, Montpellier – 11 September 1907, Prades, Pyrénées-Orientales) was a French philosopher.

Hamelin was a close friend of the sociologist Émile Durkheim, with whom he shared an interest in the French philosopher Charles Renouvier. He is also known as a translator of classical Greek philosophy.

== Biography ==
Agrégé in philosophy in 1883, he was a professor at the University of Bordeaux from 1884 and at the University of Paris from 1905. He taught Marcel Mauss at Bordeaux.

Hamelin was a follower of Charles Renouvier, founder of neocriticism, a school that proposed a synthesis of Kantianism, positivism and French spiritualism. Hamelin belonged to neocriticism, although he also drew inspiration from Hegelian dialectics through what he called the "synthetic method". His main work, Essai sur les éléments principaux de la représentation, examines all categories, leading to a personalist metaphysics. In this work, Hamelin defends a constructivist theory of philosophy, as opposed to Bergsonian intuitionism.

He drowned while trying to save two men swept into a river. He was buried in Bordeaux Protestant cemetery.

== Works ==
- Essai sur le éléments principaux de la représentation, 1907
- Le système de Descartes, 1911
- Le système d'Aristote, 1920 (edited by L. Robin)
- Le Système de Renouvier, 1927 (published by P. Mouy)
