= De Beneficiis =

First-century AD essay by Seneca the Younger

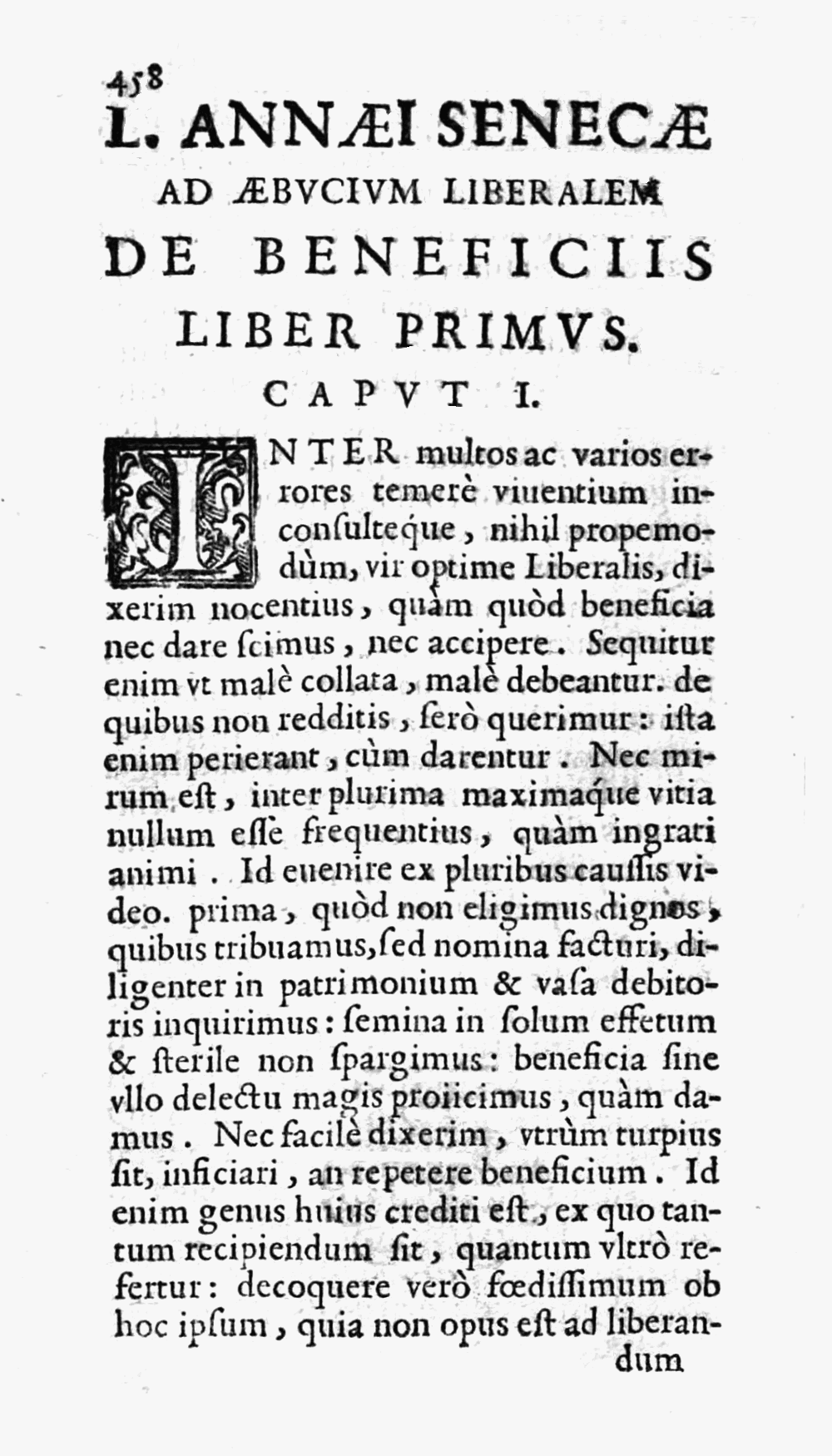
- From the 1643 edition, published by Francesco Baba
- Author: Lucius Annaeus Seneca
- Language: Latin
- Subject: Ethics
- Genre: Philosophy
- Publication date: AD c. 59
- Publication place: Ancient Rome

De Beneficiis (English: On Benefits) is a first-century work by Seneca the Younger. It forms part of a series of moral essays (or "Dialogues") composed by Seneca. De Beneficiis concerns the award and reception of gifts and favours within society, and examines the complex nature and role of gratitude within the context of Stoic ethics.

== Meaning of title ==
Although the title is typically translated as On Benefits, the word Beneficiis is derived from the Latin word beneficium, meaning a favor, benefit, service, or kindness. Other translations of the title have included: On gifts and services; On the Award and Reception of Favors; On Favours; and On kind deeds.

The work is dedicated to Aebutius Liberalis who is also the subject of Letter 91.

== Dating of the writing ==
It is considered that the work was very likely written between the years 56 and 62 AD. Mario Lentano provides a collation of a number of sources who posit different periods of about these years in Brill's Companion to Seneca. Seneca mentions the completed work in his Letters to Lucilius (81. 3) indicating that it was finished by 64. Nero was emperor during the time of writing.

== Influences ==
The Greek language term for giving and receiving is δόσις και λῆ(μ)ψις. The Stoic philosopher Hecato of Rhodes is quoted several times in the treatise and was a likely influence for Seneca.

== Contents ==
De Beneficiis comprises seven books. The first sentence of the work reads:

Among the many and diverse errors of those who live reckless and thoughtless lives, almost nothing that I can mention, excellent Liberalis, is more disgraceful than the fact that we do not know how either to give or to receive benefits.

Seneca's aim of the work was, through a discussion of benefits (to regulate a practice):

maxime humanam societatem alligat

which very much holds human society together

— - 1.4.2.

The giving of beneficia was for Seneca the most important thing that morally bound humans in society:

For it follows that if they are ill placed, they are ill acknowledged, and, when we complain, of their not being returned, it is too late, for they were lost at the time they were given.

— 1.1–2

== Themes ==
De Beneficiis concerns the nature of relative benefits to persons fulfilling the role in social exchange of either giver or receiver. This includes benefit-exchange, reciprocity, and giving and receiving, within society. The subject of the work might be thought of as social ethics, and specifically Stoic ethics.

De Beneficiis deals with ethics with regards to political leadership. As such, the work is concerned with the lives of Roman aristocrats, and the nature of their relationships. This is of the form of and etiquette of bond-formation between persons by the giving and exchanging of gifts or services (favors), and is prescriptive of the way in which the aristocrats might behave, for the good of ancient Roman society. Amicitia is the Latin term for friendship in the context of Ancient Roman culture. It represents an ideal. Relationships of this kind would be between elite males of fairly equal social standing.

== History of transmission, publications and translations ==
=== Earliest ===
The oldest extant copy of the work is of the late 8th to early 9th century. After its founding, the monastery of Lorsch acquired the archetype of the work during sometime circa 850, this had been written somewhere in Italy (probably within the area of Milan) about 800, part of a text known as the codex Nazarianus, (currently in the Palatine collection of the Vatican Library), and after numerous copies were made via monasteries in the Loire. The work was subsequently disseminated throughout Western Europe.

=== Later ===
Three English translations were made during the sixteenth and early seventeenth century. The first translation into English was made in 1569 by Nicolas Haward, of books one to three, while the first full translation into English was made in 1578 by Arthur Golding, and the second in 1614 by Thomas Lodge. Roger L'Estrange made a paraphrased work in 1678, he had been making efforts on Seneca's works since at least 1639. A partial Latin publication of books 1 to 3, being edited by M. Charpentier – F. Lemaistre, was made circa 1860, books 1 to 3 were translated into French by de Wailly, and a translation into English was made by J. W. Basore circa 1928–1935.

Nicholas Haward chose the title The line of liberalitie: duly directing the well bestowing of benefits and reprehending the common vice of ingratitude. Arthur Golding called the work Concerning Benefyting, that is to say the dooing receiyving and requyting of good turnes. The standard English form chosen after the Lodge translation of 1613 is On Benefits.

== Later reception ==
The ethics of Seneca's writing were readily assimilated by twelfth century Christian thinkers.

Michel de Montaigne was acquainted with the work.

The work is recognised as having been influential in the writing of the sociologist Marcel Mauss, specifically his essay The Gift, first published in 1925 in French, and translated in 1954 into English. The subject of the gift has become a central concept to the discipline of anthropology since Mauss.
