= Peer-polity interaction =

Concept in archaeological theory

Peer-polity interaction is a concept in archaeological theory, developed by Colin Renfrew and John Cherry, to explain changes in society and material culture.

Peer-polity interaction models see the primary driver of change as the relationships and contacts between polities of relatively equal standing. According to the model set out by Renfrew, it encompasses three main sorts of interaction:

- Competition, including warfare and competitive emulation.
- Symbolic entrainment, where societies borrow symbolic systems wholesale from their neighbours, such as numerical systems, social structures and religious beliefs, because these fill a currently empty niche in their society.
- Transmission of innovation, where technology spreads by trade, gift-giving, and other forms of exchange.
