= Hecato of Rhodes =

Greek Stoic philosopher (fl. c. 100 BCE)

Hecato or Hecaton of Rhodes (Greek: Ἑκάτων; fl. c. 100 BC) was a Greek Stoic philosopher.

He was a native of Rhodes, and a disciple of Panaetius, but nothing else is known of his life. It is clear that he was eminent amongst the Stoics of the period. He was a voluminous writer, but nothing remains. Diogenes Laërtius mentions six treatises written by Hecato:

- Περὶ ἀγαθῶν – On Goods, in at least nineteen books.
- Περὶ ἀρετῶν – On Virtues.
- Περὶ παθῶν – On Passions.
- Περὶ τελῶν – On Ends.
- Περὶ παραδόξων – On Paradoxes, in at least thirteen books.
- Χρεῖαι – Maxims.

In addition Cicero writes that Hecato wrote a work on On Duties, (Latin: De Officiis) dedicated to Quintus Tubero. Hecato is also frequently mentioned by Seneca in his treatise De Beneficiis. Seneca also quotes Hecato in his Epistulae morales ad Lucilium;

Cease to hope, and you will cease to fear. (Epistle V)

What progress, you ask, have I made? I have begun to be a friend to myself.(Epistle VI)

I can show you a philtre, compounded without drugs, herbs, or any witch's incantation: 'If you want to be loved, love.' (Epistle IX)

According to Diogenes, Hecato divided the virtues into two kinds, those founded on scientific intellectual principles (i.e. wisdom and justice), and those with no such basis (e.g., temperance and the resultant health and vigor). Like the earlier Stoics, Cleanthes and Chrysippus, Hecato also held that virtue may be taught.

Cicero shows that he was much interested in casuistical questions, as, for example, whether a good man who received a coin he knew to be bad was justified in passing it on to another. On the whole, he is inclined to regard self-interest as the best criterion. This he modifies by explaining that self-interest is based on the relationships of life; a man needs money for the sake of his children, his friends and the state whose general prosperity depends on the wealth of its citizens:

It is a wise man's duty to take care of his private interests, at the same time doing nothing contrary to the civil customs, laws, and institutions. But that depends on our purpose in seeking prosperity; for we do not aim to be rich for ourselves alone but for our children, relatives, friends, and, above all, for our country. For the private fortunes of individuals are the wealth of the state.
