= The Gift (essay) =

1925 essay by Marcel Mauss

The Gift: Forms and Functions of Exchange in Archaic Societies (French: Essai sur le don: forme et raison de l'échange dans les sociétés archaïques) is a 1925 essay by the French sociologist Marcel Mauss that is the foundation of social theories of reciprocity and gift exchange.

== History ==
Mauss's original piece was entitled Essai sur le don. Forme et raison de l'échange dans les sociétés archaïques ("An essay on the gift: the form and reason of exchange in archaic societies") and was originally published in L'Année Sociologique in 1925. This was the first issue of L'Année Sociologique published following the devastation of World War I and the deaths of 12 of Mauss's colleagues, including his maternal uncle and mentor Émile Durkheim, who had formed the intellectual circle that gave birth to the journal and the particular tradition of French sociology. Mauss was deeply affected by the deaths of these colleagues, many of whom he was indebted to for ideas that were developed in The Gift. For example, Mauss points explicitly to the role of Robert Hertz's contributions towards incorporating the Maori concept of hau, which became a key idea demonstrating how reciprocity functions.

The impact of World War I on Mauss is also apparent in his conclusions to The Gift, where he states explicitly "...the clan, the tribe, and the peoples have learned--as tomorrow, in our so-called civilized world, classes and nations and individuals too will have to learn--how to confront one another without massacring each other, and to give to each other without sacrificing themselves to the other. Herein lies on of the lasting secrets of their wisdom and their solidarity" (p.197).

Various editions and translations of The Gift have been produced. Following its initial publication in 1925, the essay was later republished in French in 1950 and translated into English in 1954 by Ian Cunnison, with a foreword by Mauss's colleague E. E. Evans-Pritchard. A second English translation was published in 1990 by W. D. Halls with a foreword by Mary Douglas, and most recently a translation by Jane I. Guyer was published in 2016.

== Summary ==
Mauss's essay focuses on the way that the exchange of objects between groups builds relationships between humans.

It analyzes the economic practices of archaic societies and finds that they have a common as well as a main practice centered on reciprocal exchange. In different archaic and indigenous societies, he finds evidence contrary to the presumptions of modern Western societies about the history and nature of exchange which assert that it is a relatively newer concept and practice. He shows that early exchange systems center around the obligations to give, to receive, and, most importantly, to reciprocate. They occur between groups, not only individuals, and they are a crucial part of “total phenomena” that work to build not just wealth and alliances marked by economic wants but social solidarity because “the gift” pervades all aspects of the society. Mauss calls it, therefore, a "total social fact". He uses a comparative method, drawing upon published secondary scholarship on peoples from around the world, but especially the Pacific Northwest (especially potlatch).

After examining the reciprocal gift-giving practices of each society, he finds in them common features, despite some variation. From the disparate evidence, he builds a case for a foundation to human society based on collective (vs. individual) exchange practices. In doing so, he refutes the English tradition of liberal thought, such as utilitarianism, as distortions of human exchange practices. He concludes by speculating that social welfare programs may be recovering some aspects of the morality of the gift within modern market economies.

=== Key Concepts ===
- Total social fact – a practice that is highly integrated across many or all spheres of society, including economic, legal, political, and religious among others; Mauss builds on Durkheim's concept of social fact.
- Total prestation – an example of a total social fact; the system of obligatory gift-giving and reciprocal exchange that is integrated across various aspects of a society.
- Reciprocity – the principle that exchanges create a mutual obligation or bond that creates a continuous cycle of giving and returning gifts.
- Hau – the force that compels the recipient of a gift to reciprocate and which desires to return to its origins (Maori)
- Taonga - an exchange item imbued with hau (Maori)
- Mana – the broader social status and standing that is constantly negotiated and validated through the process of total prestation (Polynesia)

=== The Method ===
In The Gift, Mauss draws on ethnographic data from around the world. As an ethnologist, Mauss synthesized and theorized about ethnographic work that is based on first-hand fieldwork. Therefore, he did not collect data in the field himself, but rather formed his conclusions based on the reports from the fieldwork of other anthropologists. Mauss describes the methodological approach he practices in The Gift as "the method of exact comparison" (p. 5).

With his approach to ethnology, Mauss avoided isolating specific components of a given economic system and then analyzing it apart from the broader system within which it operates. Rather, he attempted "to describe each in turn and in its entirety. Thus we have renounced that continuous comparison in which everything is mixed up together, and in which institutions lose all local color and documents their savour" (p.6). This is an important methodological choice that Mauss makes, which contributes to the success of his argument demonstrating how gift giving is a total social fact.

=== The Data ===
It is clear that Mauss read broadly, not only based on the wide range of data he incorporated into his analysis in The Gift, but also based on the quantity of book reviews that he authored in L'Année Sociologique. The primary ethnographic sources he draws on for The Gift were written by Bronislaw Malinowski describing the Kula Ring among Trobriand Islanders; Franz Boas describing the potlatch in the Pacific Northwest of the United States; and A. R. Radcliff-Brown's work on the Andaman Islanders (though he refers to Brown instead of Radcliff-Brown since this was prior to the hyphenation of Radcliff-Brown's name).

In addition to the central examples noted above, Mauss also incorporated data from Europe in the form of Scandinavian stories, Roman law, Germanic law, and Celtic law; from Hindu Vedas and Brahmanic code; and from Chinese law. By incorporating examples from dispersed geographies, Mauss demonstrated the ubiquity (and applicability) of the ideas laid out in The Gift.

== Influence ==
Mauss hoped that his work would have an influence on the way individuals in the post-World War I world would engage with one another. In the introduction to the 2016 translation, Mauerer notes "The future, of course, singularly occupied Mauss himself, who at the end of the main text put forward tentative reflections on how people could go about continuing to live with one another without repeating the horrors of world war. Horrors, that is, that the human species has continued to repeat. Yet despite the loss that surrounded him, Mauss seemed to invite us to find options, to pick up every text, to pursue every route, to wander and puzzle through alternative pathways--a commitment to persevere in the face of grief and dread" (p. ix).

Beyond Mauss's intended influence, the ideas present in The Gift have been very influential in anthropology, where there is a large field of study devoted to reciprocity and exchange. Most explicitly, Mauss's ideas in The Gift inspired one of the primary arguments in Claude Lévi-Strauss's Elementary Structures of Kinship. Lévi-Strauss's book applied Mauss's concept of reciprocity to the exchange of women in marriage, arguing that this exchange created social obligations that strengthened intra-community relationships. It has also influenced philosophers, artists, and political activists, including Georges Bataille, Jacques Derrida, Jean Baudrillard, Ernest Becker and more recently the work of David Graeber and the theologians John Milbank and Jean-Luc Marion.

Mauss's The Gift has also had impacts well-beyond anthropology and academia more broadly. Lewis Hyde's book The Gift: Imagination and the Erotic Life of Property (also published as The Gift: Creativity and the Artist in the Modern World) was greatly influenced by Mauss's The Gift, through Hyde's reading of Marshall Sahlin's discussion of Mauss's ideas in Stone Age Economics. Hyde's book has been called the "Theory Bible" of the Burning Man festival, an event that centers on reciprocity and gift giving as one of its central tenets.

== See also ==
- De Beneficiis
- Gift economy
- James George Frazer
