= Marcel Mauss =

French sociologist and anthropologist (1872–1950)

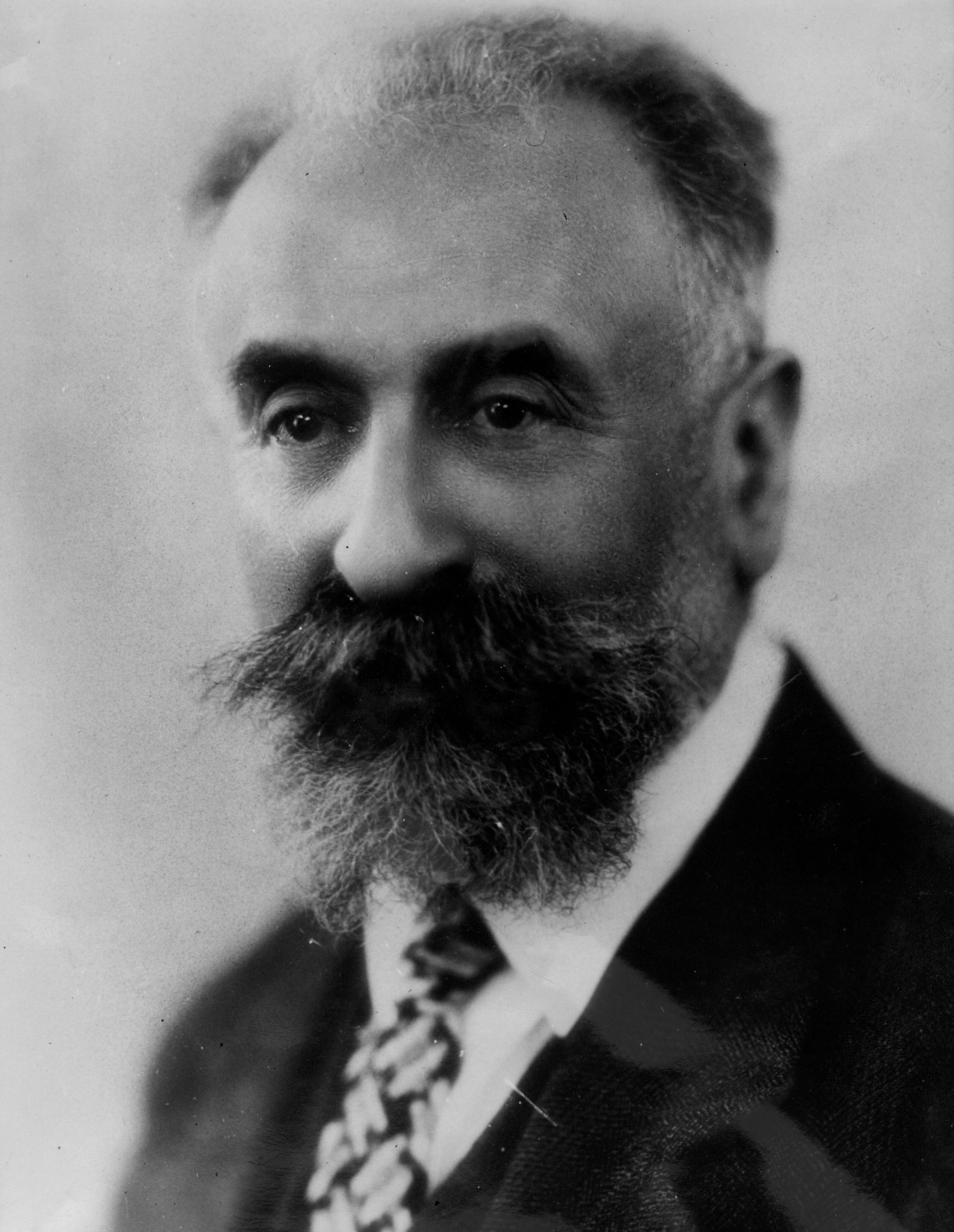
- Born: Marcel Israël Mauss; 10 May 1872; Épinal, Vosges, France
- Died: 10 February 1950 (aged 77); Paris, France
- Education: École pratique des hautes études
- Known for: The Gift
- Relatives: Émile Durkheim (uncle)
- Scientific career
- Fields: Sociology; anthropology
- Workplaces: École des hautes études en sciences sociales (EHESS)
- Academic advisors: Octave Hamelin; Sylvain Lévi
- Doctoral students: André Leroi-Gourhan

Marcel Israël Mauss (French: [mos]; 10 May 1872 – 10 February 1950) was a French sociologist and anthropologist known as the "father of French ethnology". The nephew of Émile Durkheim, Mauss, in his academic work, crossed the boundaries between sociology and anthropology. Today, he is perhaps better recognised for his influence on the latter discipline, particularly with respect to his analyses of topics such as magic, sacrifice and gift exchange in different cultures around the world. Mauss had a significant influence upon Claude Lévi-Strauss, the founder of structural anthropology. His most famous work is The Gift (1925).

== Biography ==
=== Family and education ===
Mauss was born in Épinal, Vosges, to a Jewish family, his father a merchant and his mother an embroidery shop owner. Unlike his younger brother, Mauss did not join the family business and instead he joined the socialist and cooperative movement in the Vosges. Following the death of his grandfather, the Mauss and Durkheim families grew close and at this time Mauss began to feel concerned about his education and took initiatives in order to learn. Mauss obtained a religious education and was bar mitzvahed, yet by the age of eighteen he stopped practicing his religion.

Mauss studied philosophy at Bordeaux, where his maternal uncle Émile Durkheim was teaching at the time. In the 1890s, Mauss began his lifelong study of linguistics, Indology, Sanskrit, Hebrew, and the 'history of religions and uncivilized peoples' at the École pratique des hautes études. He passed the agrégation in 1893. He was also the first cousin of the much younger Claudette (née Raphael) Bloch, a marine biologist and mother of Maurice Bloch, who became a noted anthropologist. Instead of taking the usual route of teaching at a lycée following college, Mauss moved to Paris and took up the study of comparative religion and Sanskrit.

=== Academic career ===
His first publication in 1896 marked the beginning of a prolific career that would produce several landmarks in sociological literature. Like many members of the L'Année sociologique group, Mauss was attracted to socialism, especially that espoused by Jean Jaurès. He was particularly engaged around the antisemitic events of the Dreyfus affair. Towards the end of the century, he helped edit such left-wing papers as Le Populaire, L'Humanité and Le Mouvement socialiste, the last in collaboration with Georges Sorel.

In 1901, Mauss was appointed to the Chair of the History of Religions of Non-Civilized Peoples at the École pratique des hautes études. At this point, Mauss began drawing more on ethnography, and his work began to develop characteristics now associated with formal anthropology.

Mauss served in the French army during World War I from 1914 to 1919 as an interpreter. The military service was liberating from Mauss's intense academics, as he stated, "I'm doing wonderfully. I just wasn't made for the intellectual life and I am enjoying the life war is giving me" (Fournier 2006: 175). While liberating, he also dealt with the devastation and violence of the war as many of his friends and colleagues died in the war, and his uncle Durkheim died shortly before its end. Mauss began to write a book "On Politics" that remained unfinished, but the early 1920s emphasised his energy for politics through criticism of the Bolshevik's coercive resort to violence and their destruction of the market economy.

Like many other followers of Durkheim, Mauss took refuge in administration. He secured Durkheim's legacy by founding institutions to carry out research, such as Institut Français de Sociologie (1924) and Institut d'Ethnologie in 1926. These institutions stimulated the development of fieldwork-based anthropology by young academics. Among the students he influenced were George Devereux, Jeanne Cuisinier, Alfred Metraux, Marcel Griaule, Georges Dumezil, Denise Paulme, Michel Leiris, Germaine Dieterlen, Louis Dumont, Andre-Georges Haudricourt, Jacques Soustelle, and Germaine Tillion.

In 1931 Mauss was elected as the first holder of the Chair of Sociology in the Collège de France, and soon after he married his secretary in 1934 who soon was bedridden after a poisonous gas incident. Later, in 1940, Mauss was forced out of his job as the Chair of Sociology and out of Paris due to the German occupation and anti-Semitic legislation passed. Mauss remained socially isolated following the war and died in 1950.

=== Émile Durkheim and Marcel Mauss: the uncle and the nephew ===
Moïse Durkheim and Mélanie Isidor, the parents of Émile Durkheim, had four children: Rosine (1848–1930), Félix (1850–1889), Céline (1851–1931), and Émile (1858–1917). Marcel Israël Mauss was one of the two children of Rosine Mauss and Gerson Mauss, alongside his younger brother Camille Henri Mauss. Both the uncle and nephew were born in Épinal, France, with a fourteen-year age difference. Religion is a keyword in the family life of both Mauss and Durkheim, with Moïse Durkheim being the rabbi of Épinal and chief rabbi of Vosges. Although both Mauss and Durkheim later set themselves away from religious beliefs and practices, this contributed to their mutual interest in studying the history and sociology of religion.

In 1887, Émile Durkheim was appointed to the Université de Bordeaux. He was later joined by his nephew in 1890, who was preparing for his degree in philosophy at Bordeaux. During their time at Bordeaux, Durkheim constantly interacted with Mauss through letters, guiding him in academic work and personal life. Between 1893 and 1894, when Mauss started to prepare for Agrégation, Durkheim, a philosophy agrégé and a member of the exam board, tutored Mauss for the exam. Durkheim also helped connect Mauss with Octave Hamelin, who became Mauss's close friend and an important tutor. Durkheim defined his correspondence with Mauss as:

“This correspondence which I would have liked to have been more regular was precisely intended to allow me to follow you and to prevent you from working without a goal. One must always have in view a project to carry out.”

— Émile Durkheim, Letter from Émile Durkheim to Marcel Mauss, June 18, 1894.

During their time in Bordeaux, Durkheim was a strict and responsible tutor to Mauss. In their interactions through letters, Durkheim frequently demands Mauss to provide timely updates on his studies and his interactions with Rosine and his tutors. He stressed his responsibility to train him:

“I’m the one [your mother] asked to train you. I trained you according to my ideals. One must accept the consequences of what one desired. She is free to regret it, but she cannot hold it against you.”

— Émile Durkheim, Letter from Émile Durkheim to Marcel Mauss, 1899.

The interactions between Durkheim and Mauss were not one-way help and guidance. When working on his book Suicide, Durkheim asked Mauss to help him annotate articles on suicide cases in the German army, England and Wales, and Spain, with a special focus on ranks and years of service in the army, gender, and professions. Mauss then helped Durkheim compile the statistical tables in Suicide. Durkheim, being a controversial figure in academia at the time, also seeks information about himself and other scholars’ interests in L’Année Sociologique from Mauss, although stressing it to be “secondary” when compared to updating on what Mauss was doing:

“Its [Mauss's correspondence with Durkheim] purpose is to keep me informed of what you are doing, not to give me studied reports on what is happening in Paris. You must write to me for the sake of writing to me, so that I do not lose sight of you and not to send me chronicles. That, secondarily, you tell me everything that is happening, nothing better, since it is in my interest to be informed, but that is secondary. Now here we are at the end of the year and I know nothing of what you have done. I expect that you will stop your malpractices. What did Brochard tell you about your work? How are your other projects going? That is what I want to be informed about. After that, when you know something about me, you will tell me.”

— Émile Durkheim, Letter from Émile Durkheim to Marcel Mauss, May 15, 1894, Bordeaux.

Mauss started assisting Durkheim in organizing and launching the L’Année Sociologique between 1895 and 1902. Mauss helped his uncle to recruit potential collaborators, including Paul Fauconnet, Henri Hubert, and Albert Milhaud. Durkheim envisioned the role of his nephew to be the “linchpin” in the formation of the journal and the broader theoretical transformation it would bring. Mauss was assigned to work on the religious sociology section, the most important section for Durkheim, as he envisioned the journal to “create religious sociology” and to “make religion, no longer economics, the matrix of social facts.” Other than recruitment, Mauss was assigned by Durkheim to work up a “list of important works that he think it would be useful to have” and “catalog them by subject.”

The collaboration between the uncle and nephew was not always smooth. Durkheim frequently scolded Mauss in their correspondence about his punctuality and over-complication:

“We are thus approaching the month of July. Do you not feel the march of time? Two months have passed since Easter. That is a long time to draw up a list of books.”

— Émile Durkheim, Letter from Émile Durkheim to Marcel Mauss, June 19, 1897.

“Your list is arriving; it is a real desolation for me. For I see that you do not at all represent to yourself what there is to do, and instead of helping me to resolve the difficulties, you complicate them in such proportions, that, seeing the obstacles reappear as I believed to have overcome them, I had a moment of discouragement.”

— Émile Durkheim, Letter from Émile Durkheim to Marcel Mauss, monday morning, June, 1897.

== Theoretical views ==
=== Marcel Mauss and Émile Durkheim ===
Marcel Mauss's studies under his uncle Durkheim at Bordeaux led to their doing work together on Primitive Classification which was published in L'Année Sociologique. In this work, Mauss and Durkheim attempted to create a French version of the sociology of knowledge, illustrating the various paths of human thought taken by different cultures, in particular how space and time are connected back to societal patterns. They focused their study on tribal societies in order to achieve depth.

While Mauss called himself a Durkheimian, he interpreted the school of Durkheim as his own. His early works reflect the dependence on Durkheim's school, yet as more works, including unpublished texts were read, Mauss preferred to start many projects and often not finish them. Mauss concerned himself more with politics than his uncle, as a member of the Collectivistes, French workers party, and Revolutionary socialist workers party. His political involvement led up to and after World War I.

=== The Gift ===
Mauss has been credited for his analytic framework which has been characterized as more supple, more appropriate for the application of empirical studies, and more fruitful than his earlier studies with Durkheim. His work fell into two categories, one being major ethnological works on exchange as a symbolic system, body techniques and the category of the person, and the second being social science methodology. In his The Gift, Mauss argued that gifts are never truly free, rather, human history is full of examples of gifts bringing about reciprocal exchange. The famous question that drove his inquiry into the anthropology of the gift was: "What power resides in the object given that causes its recipient to pay it back?" The answer is simple: the gift is a "total prestation" (see law of obligations), imbued with "spiritual mechanisms", engaging the honour of both giver and receiver (the term "total prestation" or "total social fact" (fait social total) was coined by his student Maurice Leenhardt after Durkheim's social fact). Such transactions transcend the divisions between the spiritual and the material in a way that, according to Mauss, is almost "magical". The giver does not merely give an object but also part of himself, for the object is indissolubly tied to the giver: "the objects are never completely separated from the men who exchange them" (1990:31). Because of this bond between giver and gift, the act of giving creates a social bond with an obligation to reciprocate on the part of the recipient. Not to reciprocate means to lose honour and status, but the spiritual implications can be even worse: in Polynesia, failure to reciprocate means to lose mana, one's spiritual source of authority and wealth. To cite Goldman-Ida's summary, "Mauss distinguished between three obligations: giving, the necessary initial step for the creation and maintenance of social relationships; receiving, for to refuse to receive is to reject the social bond; and reciprocating in order to demonstrate one's own liberality, honour, and wealth" (2018:341). Mauss describes how society is blinded by ideology, and therefore a system of prestations survives in societies when regarding the economy. Institutions are founded on the unity of individuals and society, and capitalism rests on an unsustainable influence on an individual's wants. Rather than focusing on money, Mauss describes the need to focus on faits sociaux totaux, total social facts, which are legal, economic, religious, and aesthetic facts which challenge the sociological method.

An important notion in Mauss's conceptualization of gift exchange is what Gregory (1982, 1997) refers to as "inalienability". In a commodity economy, there is a strong distinction between objects and persons through the notion of private property. Objects are sold, meaning that the ownership rights are fully transferred to the new owner. The object has thereby become "alienated" from its original owner. In a gift economy, however, the objects that are given are unalienated from the givers; they are "loaned rather than sold and ceded". It is the fact that the identity of the giver is invariably bound up with the object given that causes the gift to have a power which compels the recipient to reciprocate. Because gifts are unalienable they must be returned; the act of giving creates a gift-debt that has to be repaid. Because of this, the notion of an expected return of the gift creates a relationship over time between two individuals. In other words, through gift-giving, a social bond evolves that is assumed to continue through space and time until the future moment of exchange. Gift exchange therefore leads to a mutual interdependence between giver and receiver. According to Mauss, the "free" gift that is not returned is a contradiction because it cannot create social ties. Following the Durkheimian quest for understanding social cohesion through the concept of solidarity, Mauss's argument is that solidarity is achieved through the social bonds created by gift exchange. Mauss emphasizes that exchanging gifts resulted from the will of attaching other people – 'to put people under obligations', because "in theory such gifts are voluntary, but in fact they are given and repaid under obligation".

=== Mauss and Hubert ===
Mauss also focused on the topic of sacrifice. The book Sacrifice and its Function which he wrote with Henri Hubert in 1899 argued that sacrifice is a process involving sacralising and desacralising. This was when the "former directed the holy towards the person or object, and the latter away from a person or object." Mauss and Hubert proposed that the body is better understood not as a natural given. Instead, it should be seen as the product of specific training in attributes, deportments, and habits. Furthermore, the body techniques are biological, sociological, and psychological and in doing an analysis of the body, one must apprehend these elements simultaneously. They defined the person as a category of thought, the articulation of particular embodiment of law and morality. Mauss and Hubert believed that a person was constituted by personages (a set of roles) which were executed through the behaviors and exercise of specific body techniques and attributes.

Mauss and Hubert wrote another book titled A General Theory of Magic in 1902 [see external links for PDF]. They studied magic in 'primitive' societies and how it has manifested into our thoughts and social actions. They argue that social facts are subjective and therefore should be considered magic, but society is not open to accepting this. In the book, Mauss and Hubert state:

In magic, we have officers, actions, and representations: we call a person who accomplishes magical actions a magician, even if he is not professional; magical representations are those ideas and beliefs which correspond to magical actions; as for these actions, with regard to which we have defined the other elements of magic, we shall call them magical rites. At this stage it is important to distinguish between these activities and other social practices with which they might be confused.

They go on to say that only social occurrences can be considered magical. Individual actions are not magic because if the whole community does not believe in efficacy of a group of actions, it is not social and therefore, cannot be magical.

== Legacy ==
While Mauss is known for several of his own works – most notably his masterpiece Essai sur le Don ('The Gift') – much of his best work was done in collaboration with members of the Année Sociologique, including Durkheim (Primitive Classification), Henri Hubert (Outline of a General Theory of Magic and Essay on the Nature and Function of Sacrifice), Paul Fauconnet (Sociology) and others.

Mauss influenced French anthropology and social science. He did not have a great number of students like many other Sociologists did; however, he taught ethnographic method to first generation French anthropology students. In addition to this, Mauss's ideas have had a significant impact on Anglophile post-structuralist perspectives in anthropology, cultural studies, and cultural history. He modified post-structuralist and post-Foucauldian intellectuals because he combines an ethnographic approach with contextualization that is historical, sociological, and psychological.

Mauss served as an important link between the sociology of Durkheim and contemporary French sociologists. Some of these sociologists include: Claude Levi Strauss, Pierre Bourdieu, Marcel Granet, and Louis Dumont. The essay on The Gift is the origin for anthropological studies of reciprocity. His analysis of the Potlatch has inspired Georges Bataille (The Accursed Share), then the situationists (the name of the first situationist journal was Potlatch). This term has been used by many interested in gift economies and open-source software, although this latter use sometimes differs from Mauss's original formulation. See also Lewis Hyde's revolutionary critique of Mauss in "Imagination and the Erotic Life of Property". He also impacted the Mouvement Anti-Utilitariste dans les Sciences Sociales and David Graeber.

== Critiques ==
Mauss's views on the nature of gift exchange have had critics. Main critiques against Mauss stem from beliefs that Mauss's essay is analyzing all primitive and archaic societies, but rather his essay is used to apply to one society and relationships within. French anthropologist Alain Testart (1998), for example, argues that there are "free" gifts, such as passers-by giving money to beggars, e.g. in a large Western city. Donor and receiver do not know each other and are unlikely ever to meet again. In this context, the donation certainly creates no obligation on the side of the beggar to reciprocate; neither the donor nor the beggar have such an expectation. Testart argues that only the latter can actually be enforced. He feels that Mauss overstated the magnitude of the obligation created by social pressures, particularly in his description of the potlatch amongst North American Indians.

Gift Economy theorist Genevieve Vaughan (1997) criticizes the French school of thought based on Mauss, exemplified by Jacques Godbout and Serge Latouche and the Mouvement Anti-utilittarisse des Sciences Sociales, for defining gift-giving as consisting of "three moments: giving, receiving, and giving back. The insistence upon reciprocity hides the communicative character of simple giving and receiving without reciprocity and does not allow this group to make a clear distinction between gift-giving and exchange as two opposing paradigms." In subsequent works, for example, The Gift in the Heart of Language: The Maternal Source of Meaning (2015) Vaughan elaborated on gift-giving as a relation between giver and receiver that takes its form from the primal human experience of mothering and being mothered.

Another example of a non-reciprocal "free" gift is provided by British anthropologist James Laidlaw (2000). He describes the social context of Indian Jain renouncers, a group of itinerant celibate renouncers living an ascetic life of spiritual purification and salvation. The Jainist interpretation of the doctrine of ahimsa (an extremely rigorous application of principles of nonviolence) influences the diet of Jain renouncers and compels them to avoid preparing food, as this could potentially involve violence against microscopic organisms. Since Jain renouncers do not work, they rely on food donations from lay families within the Jain community. However, the former must not appear to be having any wants or desires, and only very hesitantly and apologetically receives the food prepared by the latter. "Free" gifts therefore challenge the aspects of the Maussian notion of the gift unless the moral and non-material qualities of gifting are considered. These aspects are, of course, at the heart of the gift, as demonstrated in books such as Annette Weiner's (1992) Inalienable Possessions: The Paradox of Keeping While Giving.

Mauss's view on sacrifice was also controversial at the time. This was because it conflicted with the psychologisation of individuals and social behavior. In addition to this, Mauss's terms like persona and habitus have been used among some sociological approaches. French philosopher Georges Bataille used The Gift to draw new conclusions based on economic anthropology, in this case, an interpretation of how money is increasingly being wasted in society. They have also been included in recent sociological and cultural studies by Pierre Bourdieu. Bourdieu used Mauss's concept habitus through sociological concepts of socialization the embodiment of consciousness, an example being muscle memory.

== Selected works ==
- Essai sur la nature et la fonction du sacrifice, (with Henri Hubert) 1898.
- La sociologie: objet et méthode, (with Paul Fauconnet) 1901.
- De quelques formes primitives de classification, (with Durkheim) 1902.
- Esquisse d'une théorie générale de la magie, (with Henri Hubert) 1902.
- Essai sur le don, 1925.
- Les techniques du corps, 1934. Marcel Mauss, "Les techniques du corps" (1934) Journal de Psychologie 32 (3–4). Reprinted in Mauss, Sociologie et anthropologie, 1936, Paris: PUF.
- Sociologie et anthropologie, (selected writings) 1950.
- Manuel d'ethnographie. 1967. Editions Payot & Rivages. (Manual of Ethnography 2009. Translated by N. J. Allen. Berghan Books.)
- On prayer, New York : Durkheim Press/Berghahn Books, 2008.

== Honors and awards ==
- Officer of the Order of Legion of Honour
- Croix de guerre 1914-1918 (France)

== See also ==
- Archaeology of trade
- Bronisław Malinowski
- De Beneficiis
- Kula ring
- Ernest Becker
- James George Frazer
