= Henri Hubert =

French archaeologist and sociologist

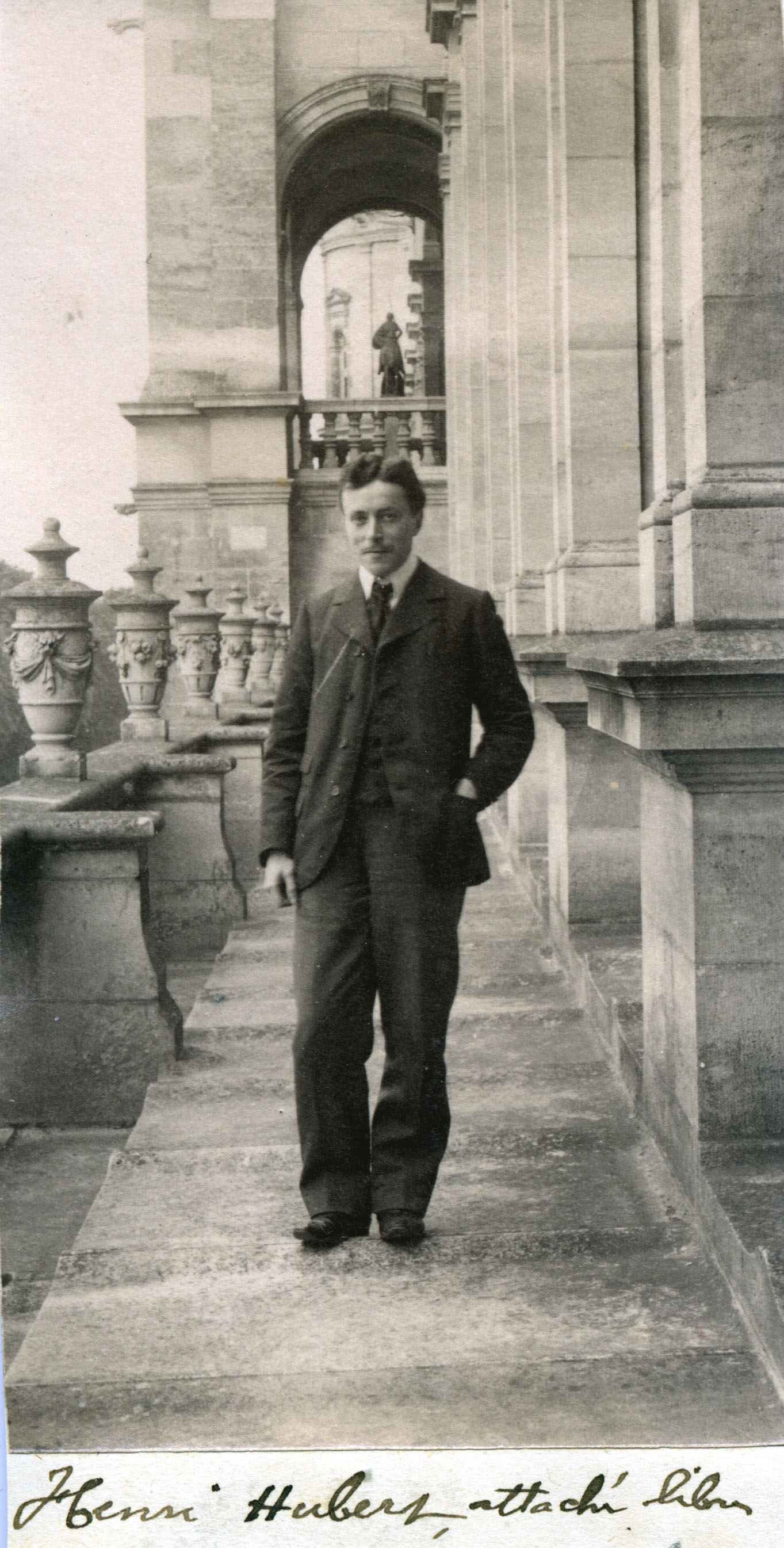
- Born: 23 June 1872; Paris, France
- Died: 25 May 1927 (aged 54); Chatou, France
- Occupations: Archaeologist; Sociologist

Henri Hubert (23 June 1872 – 25 May 1927) was a French archaeologist and sociologist of comparative religion who is best known for his work on the Celts and his collaboration with Marcel Mauss and other members of the Année Sociologique.

== Life and work ==
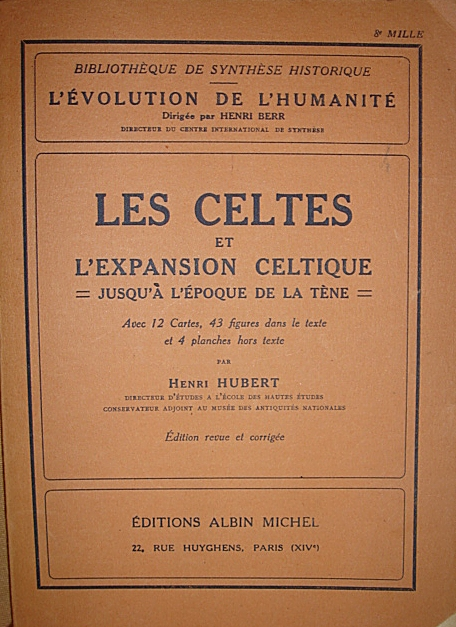
A synthesis which made date. First posthumous edition by Marcel Mauss in the series of Henri Berr

Hubert was born and raised in Paris, where he attended Lycée Louis-le-Grand. There he was influenced by the school chaplain, Abbé Quentin, who instilled in him an interest in religion and in particular in religion amongst Assyrians. He entered the École Normale Supérieure. He began to study the history of Christianity. He passed the agrégation in history in 1895 after studying the Eastern Orthodox Church, the Byzantine Empire, and iconoclasm. His doctoral thesis focused on pre-Christian religion in Asia Minor.

Unlike most French academics, Hubert focused on research rather than teaching after graduation. He took a position at the École Pratique des Hautes Études and in 1898 he also took up a position at the Musée des Antiquités. It was at this time that he grew increasingly interested in Celtic history and culture.

It was also in 1898 that Hubert became a close friend of Marcel Mauss and began collaborating on the Année Sociologique of Émile Durkheim, where he eventually became responsible for the section on the 'sociology of religion'. Hubert and Mauss were to collaborate on several important works in the future, including an "Sacrifice: Its Nature and Function" (1899) and their Outline of a General Theory of Magic (1904).

By 1906 Mauss was thoroughly ensconced at the Ecole Pratique, where he would remain until his death. It was also this time that he took up a post at the École du Louvre where he lectured on the ethnographic prehistory of Europe. Throughout the first two decades of the twentieth century Hubert continued to publish on both Asia and the Celts as well as more general topics. Works from this period include (in English translation) The Rise of the Celts and The Greatness and Decline of the Celts, both available in a single volume entitled The History of the Celtic People (London: Kegan Paul, Trench, Trubner 1934; reprint Bracken 1993). His follow-up work on the Germanic peoples, entitled Les Germains and published posthumously in 1952, has yet to be translated to English. Also from this period is Essay on Time: A Brief Study of the Representation of Time in Religion and Magic.

Durkheim's death in 1917 affected Hubert greatly, as did the death of his wife in childbirth in 1924. After years of bereavement, Hubert died in 1927.

== Bibliography ==
- Les Celtes et l'expansion celtique jusqu'à l'époque de La Tène, Albin Michel Paris (1932) reissued (1974), reissued by Jean de Bonnot (2007)
- Les Celtes depuis l'époque de la Tène et la civilisation celtique, La renaissance du livre (1932), reissued by Jean de Bonnot (2007)
- Les Germains: Cours professé à l'école du Louvre en 1924-1925, Albin Michel Paris (1952)
