= L'Année sociologique =

- Discipline: Sociology
- Language: English, French
- Edited by: Gianluca Manzo

Publication details
- History: 1898–present
- Publisher: Presses Universitaires de France (France)
- Frequency: Biannual

Standard abbreviations
- ISO 4: Année sociol.

Indexing
- ISSN: 0066-2399 (print); 1969-6760 (web)
- LCCN: sf98085180
- JSTOR: 00662399
- OCLC no.: 746938444

Links
- Journal homepage; Online access at Cairn.info; English version

L'Année sociologique is a biannual peer-reviewed academic journal of sociology established in 1898 by Émile Durkheim, who also served as its first editor-in-chief. It was published annually as Les Cadres sociaux de la Memoire until 1925, changing its name to Annales Sociologiques between 1934 and 1942. After World War II it returned to its original name. Durkheim established the journal as a way of publicizing his own research and the research of his students and other scholars working within his new sociological paradigm.

== History ==
Until 1969 a part of the journal was classified into three groups: (1) anthropology and sociology, (2) empirical qualitative sociology, and (3) empirical quantitative sociology. The rest was dedicated to book reviews. Durkheim wanted to use the journal to describe the contents of the books reviewed.

Many well-known sociologists were initial contributors to the journal, including Célestin Bouglé, Henri Hubert, Marcel Mauss, François Simiand, and Georg Simmel. During Durkheim's editorship of the journal, the editorial board comprised a team of approximately fifty researchers, a group which became known as the "French School of Sociology".

The journal was relaunched following a break in publication due to World War I and the death of Durkheim in 1917. Mauss' essay The Gift was the only article included in the relaunched edition, preceded by his eulogy to colleagues who had died since the previous edition in 1912.

=== Modern journal ===
Although originally influenced by Émile Durkheim, the modern journal is based on research in the history of the social sciences. Originally publishing in French only, the journal now also publishes translations from French and articles written in English.

== Abstracting and indexing ==
The journal is abstracted and indexed in

- EBSCO databases
- FRANCIS
- Index Islamicus
- International Bibliography of Periodical Literature
- ProQuest databases
- Scopus

== See also ==
- List of sociology journals
