= Bibliography of anthropology =

This bibliography of anthropology lists some notable publications in the field of anthropology, including its various subfields. It is not comprehensive and continues to be developed. It also includes a number of works that are not by anthropologists but are relevant to the field, such as literary theory, sociology, psychology, and philosophical anthropology.

Anthropology is the study of humanity. Described as "the most humanistic of sciences and the most scientific of the humanities", it is considered to bridge the natural sciences, social sciences and humanities, and draws upon a wide range of related fields. In North America, anthropology is traditionally divided into four major subdisciplines: biological anthropology, sociocultural anthropology, linguistic anthropology and archaeology. Other academic traditions use less broad definitions, where one or more of these fields are considered separate, but related, disciplines.

== Sociocultural anthropology ==
=== Chronological bibliography ===
==== From the beginnings to 1899 ====
- Georg Forster, A Voyage Round the World, 1777
- Immanuel Kant, Anthropology from a Pragmatic Point of View, 1798
- Jacob Burckhardt, The Civilization of the Renaissance in Italy, 1860
- Johann Jakob Bachofen, Myth, Religion, and Mother Right: Selected Writings of J.J. Bachofen, 1861 (English translation: 1967)
- Edward Burnett Tylor, Primitive Culture, 1871
- Lewis H. Morgan, Systems of Consanguinity and Affinity of the Human Family (1871), Ancient Society, 1877
- John Wesley Powell, The Arid Lands (originally published as Report on the Lands of the Arid Regions of the United States), 1878
- Adolf Bastian, Der Völkergedanke im Aufbau einer Wissenschaft vom Menschen, 1881 (German; not yet translated into English)
- Friedrich Engels, The Origin of the Family, Private Property and the State, 1884
- Anténor Firmin, The Equality of the Human Races, 1885
- James George Frazer, The Golden Bough, 1890
- Edvard Westermarck, The History of Human Marriage, 1891
- James Mooney, The Ghost-dance religion and the Sioux outbreak of 1890. US Bureau of American Ethnology, 1892-3 Annual Report, 2 vols., 1896.

==== 1900s and 1910s ====
- Henri Hubert and Marcel Mauss, A General Theory of Magic, 1902 (republished by Mauss in 1950)
- Émile Durkheim, Primitive Classification, 1903
- Max Weber, The Protestant Ethic and the Spirit of Capitalism, 1905 (English translation: 1930)
- Arnold van Gennep, The Rites of Passage, 1909
- Lucien Lévy-Bruhl, How Natives Think, 1910
- Franz Boas, The Mind of Primitive Man, 1911
- Fritz Graebner, Methode der Ethnologie, 1911 (in German, not yet translated into English)
- Émile Durkheim, The Elementary Forms of the Religious Life, 1912
- Sigmund Freud, Totem and Taboo, 1913
- W. H. R. Rivers, Kinship and Social Organisation, 1914
- Max Weber, The Religion of China: Confucianism and Taoism, 1915 (English translation: 1951)
- B. R. Ambedkar, Castes in India: Their Mechanism, Genesis and Development, 1917

==== 1920s and 1930s ====
- Bronisław Malinowski, Argonauts of the Western Pacific, 1922
- Alfred Radcliffe-Brown, The Andaman Islanders, 1922
- W. H. R. Rivers, Medicine, Magic and Religion, 1924
- Marcel Mauss, The Gift, 1925
- Maurice Halbwachs, On Collective Memory, 1925
- Franz Boas, Primitive Art, 1927
- Bronisław Malinowski, Sex and Repression in Savage Society, 1927
- Margaret Mead, Coming of Age in Samoa, 1928
- Franz Boas, Anthropology and Modern Life, 1928
- Richard Thurnwald, Die menschliche Gesellschaft in ihren ethnosoziologischen Grundlagen, 1931–35 (German; not yet translated into English)
- Ruth Benedict, Patterns of Culture, 1934
- Robert Lowie, The Crow Indians, 1935
- Zora Neale Hurston, Mules and Men, 1935
- Bronisław Malinowski, Coral Gardens and Their Magic: A Study of the Methods of Tilling the Soil and of Agricultural Rites in the Trobriand Islands, 1935
- E. E. Evans-Pritchard, Witchcraft, Oracles and Magic among the Azande, 1937 (abridged edition published in 1976)
- Leo Frobenius, African Genesis: Folk Tales and Myths of Africa, 1937
- Johan Huizinga, Homo Ludens: A Study of the Play-Element in Culture, 1938
- Jomo Kenyatta, Facing Mount Kenya, 1938
- Zora Neale Hurston, Tell My Horse, 1938
- Wilhelm Schmidt, The Culture Historical Method of Ethnology, 1939

==== 1940s and 1950s ====
- Franz Boas, Race, Language and Culture, 1940
- E. E. Evans-Pritchard, The Nuer, 1940
- Meyer Fortes and E. E. Evans-Pritchard, African Political Systems, 1940
- Melville J. Herskovits, The Myth of The Negro Past, 1941
- Karl Polanyi, The Great Transformation, 1944
- Ruth Benedict, The Chrysanthemum and the Sword, 1946
- Ernesto de Martino, Il mondo magico: Prolegomeni allo studio del magismo, 1948
- Fei Xiaotong, From the Soil: The Foundations of Chinese Society, 1948 (English translation: 1992)
- Clyde Kluckhohn, Mirror for Man: The Relation of Anthropology to Modern Life, 1949
- Tarak Chandra Das, Bengal Famine(1943) : As Revealed in a Survey of the Destitutes in Calcutta, 1949
- Alfred L. Kroeber, The Nature of Culture, 1952
- Laura Bohannan, Return to Laughter, 1954
- Edmund Leach, Political Systems of Highland Burma: A Study of Kachin Social Structure, 1954
- Claude Lévi-Strauss, Tristes Tropiques, 1955
- Ralph Linton, The Tree of Culture, 1955 (posthumously)
- Julian Steward, Theory of Culture Change: The Methodology of Multilinear Evolution, 1955
- E. E. Evans-Pritchard, Nuer Religion, 1956
- Georges Balandier, Ambiguous Africa: Cultures in Collision, 1957
- Richard Hoggart, The Uses of Literacy: Aspects of Working-Class Life, 1957
- Leslie White, The Evolution of Culture: The Development of Civilization to the Fall of Rome, 1959
- Claude Lévi-Strauss, Structural Anthropology, 1958
- Raymond Williams, Culture and Society, 1958
- Alfred Métraux, Voodoo in Haiti, 1958
- Fredrik Barth, Political Leadership Among Swat Pathans, 1959
- C. P. Snow, The Two Cultures, 1959

==== 1960s and 1970s ====
- R. G. Lienhardt, Divinity and Experience: the Religion of the Dinka, 1961
- Robert Lowie, Empathy: Or 'Seeing from Within', 1960
- Frantz Fanon, The Wretched of the Earth, 1961 (English translation: 1963)
- Colin Turnbull, The Forest People, 1961
- Claude Lévi-Strauss, The Savage Mind, 1962 (English translation: 1966)
- Clifford Geertz, Agricultural Involution: The Processes of Ecological Change in Indonesia, 1963
- Peter Worsley, The Third World, 1964
- Max Gluckman, Politics, Law and Ritual in Tribal Society, 1965
- Mary Douglas, Purity and Danger: An Analysis of Concepts of Pollution and Taboo, 1966
- Louis Dumont, Homo Hierarchicus, 1966
- George Devereux, From Anxiety to Method in the Behavioral Sciences, 1967
- Victor Turner, The Forest of Symbols, 1967
- Napoleon Chagnon, Yanomamö: The Fierce People, 1968
- Joseph Campbell, The Flight of the Wild Gander, 1968
- Fredrik Barth, Ethnic Groups and Boundaries, 1969
- Victor Turner, The Ritual Process: Structure and Anti-Structure, 1969
- Mary Douglas, Natural Symbols, 1970
- Gregory Bateson, Steps to an Ecology of Mind, 1972
- H. R. Bernard and P. J. Pelto, Technology and Social Change, 1972
- Pierre Bourdieu, Outline of a Theory of Practice, 1972
- Clifford Geertz, The Interpretation of Cultures, 1973 (including "Deep Play: Notes on the Balinese Cockfight")
- Ernest Becker, The Denial of Death, 1973
- Giulio Angioni, Tre saggi sull'antropologia dell'età coloniale, 1973
- Talal Asad, Anthropology and the Colonial Encounter, 1973
- Marshall Sahlins, Stone Age Economics, 1974
- Pierre Clastres, Society Against the State, 1974
- John W. Cole and Eric Wolf, The Hidden Frontier: Ecology and Ethnicity in an Alpine Valley, 1974 (republished in 1999 with a new introduction by Eric Wolf)
- Henri Lefebvre, The Production of Space, 1974 (English translation: 1991)
- Claude Meillassoux, Maidens, Meal and Money: Capitalism and the Domestic Community, 1975 (English translation: 1981)
- Michel de Certeau, The Writing of History, 1975 (English translation: 1988)
- Cornelius Castoriadis, The Imaginary Institution of Society, 1975
- Roy Wagner, The Invention of Culture, 1975
- Edward T. Hall, Beyond Culture, 1976
- Marshall Sahlins, Culture and Practical Reason, 1976
- Giulio Angioni, Sa laurera: il lavoro contadino in Sardegna, 1976
- Marvin Harris, Cannibals and Kings, 1977
- Jack Goody, The Domestication of the Savage Mind, 1977
- Jeanne Favret-Saada, Les Mots, la mort, les sorts : la sorcellerie dans le bocage, 1977 (Deadly Words: Witchcraft in the Bocage, 1980)
- Paul Rabinow, Reflections on Fieldwork in Morocco, 1977
- Hans Peter Duerr, Dreamtime: Concerning the Boundary between Wilderness and Civilization
- Edward Said, Orientalism, 1978
- Marvin Harris, Cultural Materialism: The Struggle for a Science of Culture, 1979
- Bruno Latour and Steve Woolgar, Laboratory Life, 1979

==== 1980s ====
- Steven Feld, Sound and Sentiment: Birds, Weepings, Poetics and Sound in Kaluli Expression, 1982
- Michelle Rosaldo, Knowledge and Passion: Notions of Self and Society among the Ilongot, 1980
- Lila Abu-Lughod, Veiled Sentiments, 1986
- Ulf Hannerz, Exploring the City: Inquiries Toward an Urban Anthropology, 1980
- George Lakoff and Mark Johnson, Metaphors We Live By, 1980
- Eric Wolf, Europe and the People Without History, 1982
- Maurice Godelier, The Making of Great Men, 1982
- Nigel Barley, The Innocent Anthropologist: Notes From a Mud Hut, 1983
- Benedict Anderson, Imagined Communities, 1983
- Eric Hobsbawm and Terence Ranger (editors), The Invention of Tradition, 1983
- Johannes Fabian, Time and the Other: How Anthropology Makes Its Object, 1983
- Louis Dumont, Essays on Individualism: Modern Ideology in Anthropological Perspective, 1983
- Clifford Geertz, Local Knowledge: Further Essays in Interpretive Anthropology, 1983
- Ernest Gellner, Nations and Nationalism, 1983
- Jack Goody, The Development of the Family and Marriage in Europe, 1983
- Maurice Godelier, The Mental and the Material, 1984
- Sidney Mintz, Sweetness and Power, 1985
- James Clifford and George Marcus (editors), Writing Culture: The Poetics and Politics of Ethnography, 1986
- Philippe Descola, La Nature domestique : symbolisme et praxis dans l'écologie des Achuar, 1986
- Clifford Geertz, Works and Lives: The Anthropologist as Author, 1988
- Samir Amin, Eurocentrism, 1988
- David Kertzer, Ritual, Politics, and Power, 1988
- James Clifford, The Predicament of Culture: Twentieth-Century Ethnography, Literature, and Art, 1988
- Bruce Kapferer, Legends of People, Myths of State, 1988
- Adam Kuper, The Invention of Primitive Society: Transformations of an Illusion, 1988 (republished as an expanded and revised new edition, entitled The Reinvention of Primitive Society: Transformations of a Myth in 2005)
- Marilyn Strathern, The Gender of the Gift: Problems with Women and Problems with Society in Melanesia, 1988
- Brackette F. Williams, "A Class Act: Anthropology and the Race to Nation Across Ethnic Terrain", 1989

==== 1990s ====
- James Ferguson, The Anti-Politics Machine: "Development", Depoliticization and Bureaucratic Power in Lesotho, 1990
- Judith Butler, Gender Trouble, 1990
- Stanley Jeyaraja Tambiah, Magic, Science and Religion and the Scope of Rationality, 1990
- Bruno Latour, We Have Never Been Modern, 1991 (English translation: 1993)
- Donna Haraway, Simians, Cyborgs and Women: The Reinvention of Nature, 1991
- Donald Brown, Human Universals, 1991
- Helena Norberg-Hodge, Ancient Futures: Learning from Ladakh, 1991
- Sharlotte Neely, Snowbird Cherokees , 1991
- Jan Assmann, Cultural Memory and Early Civilization: Writing, Remembrance, and Political Imagination, 1992 (English translation: 2011)
- Marc Augé, Non-Places: Introduction to an Anthropology of Supermodernity, 1992
- Maurice Bloch, Prey into Hunter: The Politics of Religious Experience, 1992
- Eduardo Viveiros de Castro, From the Enemy's Point of View: Humanity and Divinity in an Amazonian Society, 1992
- Jeremy Coote and A. Shelton (eds), Anthropology, Art and Esthetics, 1992
- Mary Douglas, Risk and Blame: Essays in Cultural Theory, 1992
- Annette B. Weiner, Inalienable Possessions: The Paradox of Keeping-While-Giving, 1992.
- Michael Taussig, Mimesis and Alterity: A Particular History of the Senses, 1993
- Fredrik Barth, Balinese Worlds, 1993
- Homi K. Bhabha, The Location of Culture, 1994
- Bernard Stiegler, Technics and Time
- Michel-Rolph Trouillot, Silencing the Past: Power and the Production of History, 1995
- John Brockman, The Third Culture, 1995
- Italo Pardo, Managing Existence in Naples: Morality, Action and Structure, 1996
- Raymond Firth, Religion: A Humanist Interpretation, 1996
- Jack Goody, The East in the West, 1996
- Hugh Gusterson, Nuclear Rites: a Weapons Laboratory at the End of the Cold War, 1996
- Arjun Appadurai, Modernity at Large, 1996
- Anne Fadiman, The Spirit Catches You and You Fall Down, 1997
- James Clifford, Routes: Travel and Translation in the Late Twentieth Century, 1997
- Akhil Gupta and James Ferguson, Anthropological Locations: Boundaries and Grounds of a Field Science, 1997
- Jeremy Narby, The Cosmic Serpent: DNA and the Origins of Knowledge, 1998
- Stefan Helmreich, Silicon Second Nature: Culturing Artificial Life in a Digital World, 1998
- Aihwa Ong, Flexible Citizenship: The Cultural Logics of Transnationality, 1999

==== 2000s ====
- Sally Merry, Colonizing Hawaiʻi: The cultural power of law, 2000
- Clifford Geertz, Available Light: Anthropological Reflections on Philosophical Topics, 2000
- Gordon Mathews, Global Culture/Individual Identity: Searching for Home in the Cultural Supermarket, 2000
- Tim Ingold, The perception of the environment: essays on livelihood, dwelling and skill, 2000
- Frans de Waal, The Ape and the Sushi Master, 2001
- William Ray, The Logic of Culture: Authority and Identity in the Modern Era, 2001
- Vassos Argyrou, Anthropology and the Will to Meaning: A Postcolonial Critique, 2002
- Jone Salomonsen, Enchanted Feminism: The Reclaiming Witches of San Francisco, 2002
- Talal Asad, Formations of the Secular: Christianity, Islam, Modernity, 2003
- Jean Rouch, Cine-Ethnography, 2003
- Theodore C. Bestor, Tsukiji: The Fish Market at the Center of the World, 2004
- Janet Carsten, After Kinship, 2004
- Aihwa Ong and Stephen J. Collier, Global Assemblages: Technology, Politics, and Ethics as Anthropological Problems, 2004
- Anna L. Tsing, Friction: An Ethnography of Global Connection, 2005
- Marcel Detienne, The Greeks and Us: A Comparative Anthropology of Ancient Greece, 2005 (English translation: 2007)
- Jean-Pierre Olivier de Sardan, Anthropology and development. Understanding contemporary social change, 2005
- Nicholas Wade, Before the Dawn: Recovering the Lost History of Our Ancestors, 2006
- Guha Abhijit, Land, Law, and the Left: the Saga of Disempowerment of the Peasantry in the Era of Globalisation, 2007
- Philippe Descola, Beyond Nature and Culture, 2005 (English translation: 2013)
- Paige West, Conservation is our Government now: The Politics of Ecology in Papua New Guinea, 2006
- Veena Das, Life and Words: Violence and the Descent into the Ordinary, 2007
- Andrew Apter, Beyond Words: Discourse and Critical Agency in Africa, 2007
- Paul Rabinow, Marking Time: On the Anthropology of the Contemporary, 2008
- Eugene S. Hunn, A Zapotec Natural History, 2008
- Johannes Fabian, Ethnography as Commentary: Writing from the Virtual Archive, 2008
- Stefan Helmreich, Alien Ocean: Anthropological Voyages in Microbial Seas, 2009
- Giuliana B. Prato (editor), Beyond Multiculturalism, 2009
- Neni Panourgiá, Dangerous Citizens: The Greek Left and the Terror of the State, 2009
- Philippe Bourgeois and Jeff Schonberg, Righteous Dopefiend, 2009

==== 2010s ====
- Margaret Lock and Vinh-Kim Nguyen, An Anthropology of Biomedicine, 2010
- Ulf Hannerz, Anthropology's World: Life in a Twenty-First Century Discipline, 2010
- Jesús Padilla Gálvez, Philosophical Anthropology. Wittgenstein's Perspective. Berlin, De Gruyter, 2010. ISBN 9783110321555 Review
- David Graeber, Debt: The First 5000 Years, 2011
- Tim Ingold, Being Alive: Essays on Movement, Knowledge and Description, 2011
- Alan Barnard, Social Anthropology and Human Origins, 2011
- James D. Faubion, An Anthropology of Ethics, 2011
- Anna Grimshaw, The Ethnographer's Eye: Ways of Seeing in Modern Anthropology, 2012
- Maurice Bloch, Anthropology and the Cognitive Challenge, 2012
- Jason Ānanda Josephson, The Invention of Religion in Japan, 2012
- Neil L. Whitehead and Michael Wesch (editors) Human No More: Digital Subjectivities, Unhuman Subjects, and the End of Anthropology, 2012
- Eduardo Kohn, How Forests Think: Toward an Anthropology Beyond the Human, 2013
- Italo Pardo and Giuliana B. Prato, Legitimacy. Ethnographic and Theoretical Insights, 2018

=== Thematic bibliography ===
==== General introductions and histories ====
- Eric Wolf, Anthropology, 1964
- Adam Kuper, Anthropology and Anthropologists: The Modern British School, 1973 (3rd revised and enlarged edition, 1996)
- Peter Just and John Monaghan, Social and Cultural Anthropology: A Very Short Introduction, 2000
- Alan Barnard, History and Theory in Anthropology, 2000
- Thomas Hylland Eriksen, What is Anthropology?, 2004
- Aleksandar Bošković, Other People's Anthropologies: Ethnographic Practice on the Margins, 2008
- John S. Gilkeson, Anthropologists and the Rediscovery of America, 1886–1965, 2010
- Fredrik Barth, Andre Gingrich, Robert Parkin, and Sydel Silverman, One Discipline, Four Ways: British, German, French, and American Anthropology (The Halle Lectures), 2005

==== Ritual theory ====
- Arnold van Gennep, The Rites of Passage, 1909
- Émile Durkheim, The Elementary Forms of the Religious Life, 1912
- Sigmund Freud, Totem and Taboo, 1913
- Erving Goffman, Interaction Ritual, 1967
- Victor Turner, The Ritual Process: Structure and Anti-Structure, 1969
- David Kertzer, Ritual, Politics, and Power, 1988
- Bruce Kapferer, A Celebration of Demons, 1991
- Catherine Bell, Rituals : Perspectives and Dimensions, 1997
- Mario Perniola, Ritual Thinking: Sexuality, Death, World, 2000
- Philippe Buc, The Dangers of Ritual: Between Early Medieval Texts and Social Scientific Theory, 2001
- Robert N. McCauley and E. Thomas Lawson, Bringing Ritual to Mind: Psychological Foundations of Cultural Forms, 2002
- Steven Heine and Dale S. Wright (editors), Zen Ritual: Studies of Zen Buddhist Theory in Practice, 2008

==== Cyber anthropology ====
- Sherry Turkle, The Second Self: Computers and the Human Spirit, 1984
- Arturo Escobar, "Welcome to Cyberia: Notes on the Anthropology of Cyberculture", 1994
- Sherry Turkle, Life on the Screen: Identity in the Age of the Internet, 1995
- Stefan Helmreich, Silicon Second Nature: Culturing Artificial Life in a Digital World, 1998
- Tom Boellstorff, Coming of Age in Second Life: An Anthropologist Explores the Virtually Human, 2008
- Bonnie Nardi, My Life as a Night Elf Priest. An Anthropological Account of World of Warcraft, 2010. Ann Arbor: University of Michigan Press.
- Daniel Miller, Tales from Facebook, 2011
- Alexander Knorr, Cyberanthropology (in German), 2011
- Neil L. Whitehead and Michael Wesch (editors) Human No More: Digital Subjectivities, Unhuman Subjects, and the End of Anthropology, 2012
- Christine Hine, Ethnography for the Internet: Embedded, Embodied and Everyday, 2015. London: Bloomsbury Academic.

==== Design anthropology ====
- Wendy Gunn and Jared Donovan (eds), Design and Anthropology, 2012
- Wendy Gunn, Ton Otto and Rachel Charlotte Smith (eds), Design Anthropology: Theory and Practice, 2013

==== Ecological anthropology ====
- Julian Steward, Theory of Culture Change: The Methodology of Multilinear Evolution, 1955
- William Balée, Cultural Forests of the Amazon: A Historical Ecology of People and Their Landscapes, 2014

==== Economic anthropology ====
- Marcel Mauss, The Gift, 1925
- Karl Polanyi, The Great Transformation, 1944
- Marshall Sahlins, Stone Age Economics, 1974
- Claude Meillassoux, Maidens, Meal and Money, 1975
- Italo Pardo, Managing Existence in Naples, 1996
- Karen Ho, Liquidated: An Ethnography of Wall Street, 2009
- David Graeber, Debt: The First 5000 Years, 2011
- Chris Hann and Keith Hart, Economic Anthropology: History, Ethnography, Critique, 2011

==== Political anthropology ====
- Meyer Fortes and E. E. Evans-Pritchard, African Political Systems, 1940
- James C. Scott, Weapons of the Weak: Everyday Forms of Peasant Resistance, 1985
- Italo Pardo (ed.), Morals of Legitimacy: Between Agency and System, 2000
- Ted Lewellen, Political Anthropology: An Introduction, 2003
- Italo Pardo (ed.), Between Morality and the Law: Corruption, Anthropology and Comparative Society, 2004
- Italo Pardo and Giuliana B. Prato (eds). Citizenship and the Legitimacy f Governance, 2016

==== Psychological anthropology ====
- Charles W. Nuckolls, The Cultural Dialectics of Knowledge and Desire. Madison: University of Wisconsin Press, 1996
- Lindholm, Charles, Culture and Identity. The history, theory, and practice of psychological anthropology, 2007
- Robert, LeVine, Psychological Anthropology: A Reader on Self in Culture, 2010

==== Urban anthropology ====
- Ulf Hannerz, Exploring the City: Inquiries Toward an Urban Anthropology, 1980
- Italo Pardo and Giuliana B. Prato (eds), Anthropology in the City: Methodology and Theory, 2016
- Italo Pardo and Giulaina B. Prato (eds), The Palgrave Handbook of Urban Ethnography, 2017
- Italo Pardo and Giuliana B. Prato (editors), Urban Inequalities, 2021
- Petra Kuppinger (editor), Emergent Spaces, 2022
- Italo Pardo and Giuliana B. Prato (editors), The Legitimacy of Healthcare and Public Health, 2023
- Italo Pardo and Giuliana B. Prato (editors), Forms of Inequality and the Legitimacy of Governance, Vols 1 & 2, 2025

== Linguistic anthropology ==
- Johann Gottfried Herder, Treatise on the Origin of Language, 1772
- Wilhelm von Humboldt, On Language: On the Diversity of Human Language Construction and its Influence on the Mental Development of the Human Species, 1836
- Edward Sapir, Language: An Introduction to the Study of Speech, 1921
- Benjamin Lee Whorf, Language, Thought and Reality, 1956 (published posthumously)
- Roman Jakobson, On Linguistic Aspects of Translation, 1959
- Lev Vygotsky, Thought and Language, 1962
- Kenneth Lee Pike, Language in Relation to a Unified Theory of the Structure of Human Behaviour, 1967
- Dell Hymes, Foundations in Sociolinguistics: An Ethnographic Approach, 1974
- Penny B. Brown & Stephen Levinson Politeness: some Universals in Language Use. (1978) 1987
- John J. Gumperz Discourse Strategies, 1982.
- Robert M. W. Dixon, The Rise and Fall of Languages, 1997
- Guy Deutscher, The Unfolding of Language: The Evolution of Mankind's Greatest Invention, 2005

== Biological anthropology ==
Biological anthropology is traditionally conceived of as part of the North American four-field approach. In some universities, however, the subject has repositioned itself as human evolutionary biology. In Europe, it is sometimes taught as an individual subject at college level or as part of the discipline of biology. Its methods are informed by evolutionary biology, hence the adjunct biological. Since 1993, the Biological Anthropology Section of the American Anthropological Association has awarded the W.W. Howells Book Award in Biological Anthropology.

- Charles Darwin, On the Origin of Species, 1859
- Thomas Henry Huxley, Evidence as to Man's Place in Nature, 1863
- Alfred Russel Wallace, The Malay Archipelago, 1869
- Charles Darwin, The Descent of Man, and Selection in Relation to Sex, 1871
- Rudolf Virchow, The Freedom of Science in the Modern States, 1877
- Rudolf Virchow, Anthropological Papers, 1891
- Desmond Morris, The Naked Ape, 1967
- Jane Goodall, In the Shadow of Man, 1971
- Richard Dawkins, The Selfish Gene, 1976
- E. O. Wilson, On Human Nature, 1979
- Stephen Jay Gould, The Mismeasure of Man, 1981
- Wade Davis, The Serpent and the Rainbow, 1985
- Robert Boyd and Peter J. Richerson, Culture and the Evolutionary Process, 1985
- Jared Diamond, The Third Chimpanzee, 1991
- Helen Fisher, Anatomy of Love: A Natural History of Mating, Marriage, and Why We Stray, 1992
- Jared Diamond, Guns, Germs, and Steel, 1998
- E. O. Wilson, Consilience: The Unity of Knowledge, 1998
- Sarah Blaffer Hrdy, Mother Nature: A History of Mothers, Infants and Natural Selection, 1999
- Paul Farmer, Pathologies of Power: Health, Human Rights, and the New War on the Poor, 2003
- Jared Diamond, Collapse: How Societies Choose to Fail or Succeed, 2005
- Peter J. Richerson and Robert Boyd, Not by Genes Alone, 2005
- Dorothy Cheney and Robert Seyfarth, Baboon Metaphysics, 2007
- Steven Pinker, The Stuff of Thought: Language As a Window Into Human Nature, 2007
- Michael Tomasello, Origins of Human Communication, 2008
- Gregory Cochran and Henry Harpending, The 10,000 Year Explosion: How Civilizations Accelerated Human Evolution, 2009
- Richard Wrangham, Catching Fire: How Cooking Made Us Human, 2009
- Jared Diamond, The World Until Yesterday: What Can We Learn from Traditional Societies?, 2012
- E. O. Wilson, The Social Conquest of Earth, 2012
- Frans de Waal, The Bonobo and the Atheist, 2013

== Archaeology ==
Archaeological anthropology is traditionally conceived of as part of the North American four-field approach. With the four-field approach being questioned for its orthodoxy, the subject has gained considerable independence in recent years and some archaeologists have rejected the label anthropology. In Europe, the subject maintains closer connections to history and is simply conceived of as archaeology with a distinct research focus and methodology.

- C. W. Ceram, Gods, Graves and Scholars, 1949
- Steven Mithen, The Prehistory of the Mind: The Cognitive Origins of Art, Religion and Science, 1996
- Julian Thomas, Time, Culture and Identity: An Interpretive Archaeology, 1996
- Chris Gosden, Archaeology & Anthropology: A Changing Relationship, 1999
- Richard Bradley, An Archaeology of Natural Places, 2000
- Alison Wylie, Thinking from Things: Essays in the Philosophy of Archaeology, 2002
- Randall H. McGuire, Archaeology as Political Action, 2008

=== Archaeological theory ===
- Hawkes, Christopher (1954). "Archeological Theory and Method: Some Suggestions from the Old World". American Anthropologist. 56 (2): 155–168. doi:10.1525/aa.1954.56.2.02a00660.
- Binford, Lewis R. (1962). "Archaeology as Anthropology". American Antiquity. 28 (2): 217–225. doi:10.2307/278380. JSTOR 278380. S2CID 162242910.
- Binford, Sally R.; Binford, Lewis R., eds. (1968). New Perspectives in Archeology. Chicago, IL: Aldine Publishing Company. ISBN 978-0-202-33022-8.
- Clarke, David L. (1968). Analytical Archaeology. London: Methuen. ISBN 0-416-42850-9.
- Clarke, David L., ed. (1972). Models in Archaeology. London: Methuen. ISBN 0-416-16540-0.
- Clarke, David L. (1973). "Archaeology: the loss of innocence". Antiquity. 47 (185): 6–18. doi:10.1017/S0003598X0003461X. S2CID 34438511.
- Binford, Lewis R., ed. (1977). For Theory Building in Archaeology. New York, NY: Academic Press. ISBN 978-0-12-100050-9.
- Hodder, Ian, ed. (1982). Symbolic and Structural Archaeology. Cambridge: Cambridge University Press. ISBN 978-0-521-03550-7.
- Shanks, Michael; Tilley, Christopher (1993). Social Theory and Archaeology. Oxford: Polity Press. ISBN 978-0-7456-0184-7.
- McGuire, Randall G. (1992). A Marxist Archaeology. San Diego, CA: Academic Press. ISBN 978-0-12-484078-2.
- Renfrew, Colin; Zubrow, Ezra B.W., eds. (1994). The Ancient Mind: Elements of Cognitive Archaeology. Cambridge: Cambridge University Press. ISBN 978-0-521-45620-3.
- Tilley, Christopher (1997). A Phenomenology of Landscape: Places, Paths and Monuments. Oxford: Berg. ISBN 978-1-85973-076-8.

== Some points of reference in related disciplines ==
Anthropological research has exerted considerable influence on other disciplines such as sociology, literary theory, and philosophy. Conversely, contemporary anthropological discourse has become receptive to a wide variety of theoretical currents which in turn help to shape the cognitive identity of the subjects. Among the key publications from related disciplines that have advanced anthropological scholarship are:

- Anderson, Benedict (1983). Imagined Communities. London: Verso.
- Butler, Judith (1990). Gender Trouble.
- James, Paul (2006). Globalism, Nationalism, Tribalism: Bringing Theory Back In. London: Sage Publications.
- Said, Edward (1978). Orientalism.
