= List of scholars of ethnology =

This list of scholars of ethnology contains people who contributed in some form to the discipline of ethnology, the branch of anthropology that compares and analyzes the characteristics of different peoples and the relationship between them.

Name	Birth	Death	Nationality	
Joan Amades	July 23, 1890	January 17, 1959	Spain	
Léon Ashkenazi	June 21, 1922	October 21, 1996	Israel	
Amadou Hampâté Bâ	1901	May 15, 1991	Mali	
Johann Jakob Bachofen	December 22, 1815	November 25, 1887	Germany	
Georges Balandier	December 21, 1920	October 5, 2016	France	
Heinrich Barth	February 16, 1821	November 25, 1865	Germany	
Adolf Bastian	June 26, 1826	February 2, 1905	Germany	
Roger Bastide	April 1, 1898	April 10, 1974	France	
Gregory Bateson	May 9, 1904	July 4, 1980	United Kingdom	
Ruth Benedict	June 5, 1887	September 17, 1948	United States	
Zuzana Beňušková	October 27, 1960		Slovakia	
Gösta Berg	July 31, 1903	March 12, 1993	Sweden	
Franz Boas	July 9, 1858	December 21, 1942	Germany/United States	
Napoleon Chagnon	August 27, 1938	September 21, 2019	United States	
Charlotte Gower Chapman	1902	1982	United States	
Pierre Clastres	May 17, 1934	July 29, 1977	France	
Heinrich Cunow	April 11, 1862	August 20, 1936	Germany	
Wade Davis	December 14, 1953		Canada	
Samuel de Champlain	August 13, 1574	December 25, 1635	France	
Jared Diamond	September 10, 1937		United States	
Germaine Dieterlen	May 15, 1903	November 13, 1999	France	
Mary Douglas	March 25, 1921	May 16, 2007	United Kingdom	
Cora Du Bois	October 26, 1903	April 7, 1991	United States	
Louis Dumont	1911	November 19, 1998	France	
Mircea Eliade	March 9, 1907	April 22, 1986	Romania	
Moisés Espírito Santo Bagagem	1934		Portugal	
Edward Evan Evans-Pritchard	September 21, 1902	September 11, 1973	United Kingdom	
Safi Faye	November 22, 1943	February 22, 2023		Senegal
Raymond Firth	March 25, 1901	February 22, 2002	United Kingdom	
Robert J. Flaherty	February 16, 1884	July 23, 1951	United States	
Johann Georg Adam Forster	November 27, 1754	January 10, 1794	Germany	
Meyer Fortes	April 25, 1906	January 27, 1983	South Africa	
Reo Fortune	March 27, 1903	November 25, 1979	New Zealand	
James George Frazer	January 1, 1854	May 7, 1941	Scotland/United Kingdom	
Leo Frobenius	June 29, 1873	August 9, 1938	Germany	
Arnold van Gennep	April 23, 1873	May 7, 1957	France	
Clifford Geertz	August 23, 1926	October 30, 2006	United States	
Hallgerður Gísladóttir	September 28, 1952	February 1, 2007	Iceland	
Max Gluckman	January 26, 1911	April 13, 1975	South Africa/United Kingdom	
Fritz Graebner	March 4, 1877	July 13, 1934	Germany	
Henry Gravrand	1921	July 11, 2003	France	
Marcel Griaule	May 16, 1898	February 23, 1956	France	
Brothers Grimm	January 4, 1785 (Jacob)	September 20, 1863	Germany	
Brothers Grimm	February 24, 1786 (Wilhelm)	December 16, 1859	Germany	
Hans F. K. Günther	February 16, 1891	September 25, 1968	Germany	
Thomas Højrup	1953		Denmark	
Horatio Hale	May 3, 1817	December 28, 1896	United States/Canada	
Melville J. Herskovits	September 10, 1895	February 25, 1963	United States	
Te Rangi Hīroa	October 1877	December 1, 1951	New Zealand	
Robert Jaulin	March 7, 1928	November 21, 1996	France	
Adolf Ellegard Jensen	January 1, 1899	May 20, 1965	Germany	
Ulrike Krasberg	August 12, 1950		East Germany/Germany	
Gerd Koch	July 11, 1922	April 19, 2005	Germany	
Alfred L. Kroeber	June 11, 1876	October 5, 1960	United States	
Yanagita Kunio	July 31, 1875	August 8, 1962	Japan	
Claude Lévi-Strauss	November 28, 1908	October 30, 2009	France	
Orvar Löfgren	1943		Sweden	
Robert H. Lowie	June 12, 1883	September 21, 1957	United States	
Bronisław Malinowski	April 7, 1884	May 16, 1942	United Kingdom	
Marcel Mauss	May 10, 1872	February 10, 1950	France	
David Maybury-Lewis	May 5, 1929	December 2, 2007	Pakistan	
Margaret Mead	December 16, 1901	November 15, 1978	United States	
Odette Mennesson-Rigaud	1907	1990	Haiti	
Alfred Metraux	November 5, 1902	April 11, 1963	Switzerland	
James Mooney	February 10, 1861	December 22, 1921	United States	
Sharlotte Neely	August 13, 1948		United States	
Louis Nicolas	August 15, 1634	1682	France	
Josiah Nott	March 31, 1804	March 31, 1873	United States	
Anna-Maja Nylén	March 24, 1912	February 27, 1976	Sweden	
Dositej Obradović	February 17, 1739	April 7, 1811	Serbia	
Karl Polanyi	October 25, 1886	April 23, 1964	Austria-Hungary	
Antun Radić	June 11, 1868	February 10, 1919	Croatia	
Alfred Radcliffe-Brown	January 17, 1881	October 24, 1955	United Kingdom	
Alfred Radcliffe-Brown	January 17, 1881	October 24, 1955	United Kingdom	
Mirko Ramovš	October 5, 1935	May 19, 2023	Slovenia	
Paul Rivet	May 7, 1876	March 25, 1958	France	
Jean Rouch	May 31, 1917	February 18, 2004	France	
Marshall Sahlins	December 27, 1930		United States	
Carl Wilhelm von Sydow	December 21, 1878	March 4, 1952	Sweden	
Wilhelm Schmidt	February 16, 1868	February 10, 1954	Austria	
Carl-Herman Tillhagen	December 17, 1906	May 28, 2002	Sweden	
Colin M. Turnbull	November 23, 1924	July 28, 1994	United Kingdom/United States	
Edward Burnett Tylor	October 2, 1832	January 2, 1917	United Kingdom	
Jean-Christophe Victor	May 30, 1947	December 28, 2016	France	
Victor Turner	May 28, 1920	December 18, 1983	United Kingdom	
Huang Xianfan	November 13, 1899	January 18, 1982	China	

== See also ==
- Bibliography of anthropology#Sociocultural anthropology
