= Juan Camilo Niño Vargas =

Colombian anthropologist and ethnologist

- Education: University of the Andes (MA), School for Advanced Studies in the Social Sciences (Ph.D)
- Occupations: Anthropologist; ethnologist
- Notable work: Diccionario de la lengua ette
- Scientific career
- Fields: Anthropology, Ethnology
- Workplaces: University of the Andes
- Thesis: Cosmos Ette: Ethnographie d'un univers du nord de la Colombie
- Doctoral advisor: Philippe Descola

Juan Camilo Niño Vargas is a Colombian anthropologist and ethnologist whose research focuses on the indigenous populations of northern Colombia, particularly the Ette people and the broader Chibchan-speaking societies of the Isthmo-Colombian area. He is recognized for documenting endangered indigenous languages, examining socio-cosmologies, and contributing to comparative studies of Amerindian peoples.

== Early life and education ==
Vargas completed his undergraduate and master's degrees in Anthropology at the Universidad de los Andes, with additional studies in History, Philosophy, and Geography. He subsequently earned a Ph.D. in Social Anthropology and Ethnology from the School for Advanced Studies in the Social Sciences in Paris under the supervision of Philippe Descola. His doctoral dissertation, Cosmos Ette: Ethnographie d'un univers du nord de la Colombie, proposed new frameworks for understanding indigenous cosmologies in northern Colombia.

== Academic career ==
Vargas is an associate professor at the Department of Anthropology, University of the Andes where he teaches linguistic anthropology, ethnology, and historical anthropology courses.

He has served on editorial boards for publications addressing Indigenous cultures and languages. He is a member of the Colombian Academy of History, the Society for the Anthropology of Lowland South America, and the Center for Anthropological and Cultural Historical Research AIP - Panamá (CIHAC).

== Research focus and contributions ==
Vargas's research explores the distinctions between Amazonian animism, Mesoamerican-Andean analogism, and Chibchan socio-cosmologies. By analyzing myths, agricultural practices, and dream interpretations, he has shown that Chibchan-speaking groups, such as the Ette, maintain unique ontological visions in which deities, humans, and animals occupy intersecting but hierarchically arranged realms. His work on Ette cosmology has drawn attention to how indigenous peoples articulate decay, transformation, and regeneration concepts in ecological and spiritual contexts.

A substantial portion of his ethnographic fieldwork concerns traditional agriculture. He has argued that these practices reveal complex interactions between humans and non-human entities, contributing to broader debates on Amerindian conceptions of nature. His publications detail various aspects of Ette life, including language preservation, historical narratives, and ritual practices.

== Linguistic documentation ==
Vargas's most acclaimed contribution to linguistic anthropology is the "Diccionario de la lengua ette," published in 2018. The dictionary compiles thousands of Ette terms, providing detailed phonological analysis and extensive ethnographic background. According to an external review by Daniel E. Kraus Vollert, it represents "the most comprehensive lexicographic research on the Ette language to date". It helps bridge a gap in scholarly knowledge by linking linguistic documentation to a broader cultural revitalization effort. The Colombian Ministry of Culture acknowledged Vargas in 2015 for his work on endangered Amerindian languages, highlighting the dictionary's academic and practical value in revitalizing the Ette language.

== Bibliography ==
=== Books ===
- Niño Vargas, Juan Camilo; Universidad de los Andes (Bogotá, Colombia) (2007). Ooyoriyasa: cosmología e interpretación onírica entre los ette del norte de Colombia (in Spanish). Bogotá: Universidad de los Andes, Facultad de Ciencias Sociales-CESO, Departamento de Antropología. ISBN 978-958-695-296-5. OCLC 231444144.
- Niño Vargas, Juan Camilo (2017). Indios y viajeros: los viajes de Joseph de Brettes y Georges Sogler por el norte de Colombia, 1892-1896 (in Spanish). Bogota: Instituto Colombiano de Antropología e Historia. ISBN 978-958-8852-24-9.
- Niño Vargas, Juan Camilo (2018). Diccionario de la lengua ette (in Spanish). Bogotá, D.C., Colombia: Ediciones Uniandes. ISBN 978-958-774-667-9.
- Vargas, Juan Camilo Niño; Beckerman, Stephen (2024). Universos chibchas (in Spanish). Bogotá, D.C., Colombia: Universidad de los Andes, Facultad de Ciencias Sociales, Departamento de Antropología. ISBN 978-958-798-656-3.
- Vargas, Juan Camilo Niño; Saumeth, Narciso Puello (2023). Alfabeto ette: Las vocales de la lengua ette (in Spanish). Universidad de los Andes, Facultad de Ciencias Sociales. ISBN 978-958-798-537-5.

=== Articles ===
- Niño Vargas, Juan Camilo (2024-06-27). "La casa ette. Humanidad y arquitectura en el norte de Colombia". INDIANA - Estudios Antropológicos sobre América Latina y el Caribe (in Spanish). 41 (1): 245–272. doi:10.18441/IND.V41I1.245-272.
- La estirpe agricultora. Etnología comparada de los pueblos chibchas". Boletín de Historia y Antigüedades 874 (2022): 275-319.
- Niño Vargas, Juan Camilo (2022-07-01). "El motivo del gran árbol en las tradiciones chibchas". Literatura: Teoría, historia, crítica. 24 (2): 87–112. doi:10.15446/lthc.v24n2.102090 (inactive 1 July 2025). ISSN 2256-5450.
- Amerindian Socio-Cosmologies Between the Andes, Amazonia and Mesoamerica. Routledge. 2021-09-30. ISBN 978-1-032-17592-8.
- Niño Vargas, Juan Camilo (2020). "La división cósmica de las labores terrenales. Interacción entre humanos y no-humanos en los campos de cultivo ette". Tabula Rasa: 45–71. doi:10.25058/20112742.n36.02.
- Dubail, Charles-Henry; Dubail-Acero, Marie-Claude (2017-08-16). Bourgarel, le Colombien (in French). Paris: EdiSens. ISBN 978-2-35113-341-5.
- Niño Vargas, Juan Camilo (2014-09-17). "El tejido del cosmos. Tiempo, espacio y arte de la hamaca entre los ette (chimila)". Journal de la société des américanistes. 100 (1): 101–130. doi:10.4000/jsa.13726. ISSN 0037-9174.
- Niño Vargas, Juan Camilo (2008). "Ciclos de destrucción y regeneración: experiencia histórica entre los ette del norte de Colombia". Historia Crítica (in Spanish) (35): 105–129. doi:10.7440/histcrit35.2008.07. ISSN 0121-1617.
- Universidad de Costa Rica Departamento de Lingüística Programa de Investigación. (1982). "Estudios de lingüística chibcha". Costa Rica. San José, Costa Rica: Editorial de la Universidad de Costa Rica. ISSN 1409-245X. OCLC 947224628.
- "En las inmediaciones del fin del mundo. El encuentro de Gustaf Bolinder con los chimila". Antípoda. Revista de antropología y arqueología 11 (2010): 43-66.
