= Oscar Santillan =

Ecuadorian visual artist

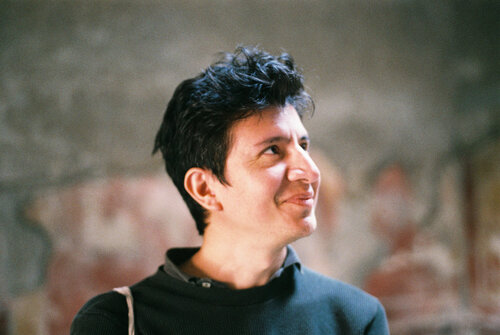
Portrait of Oscar Santillán

Oscar Santillán (born 1980, Ecuador) is a visual artist, cybernetician, and writer who lives between The Netherlands and Ecuador. His practice emerges from the notion of 'Antimundo' which he understands as "a way of identifying and generating realities that do not fit in the world".

Santillán's 'Antimundo' can be perceived in projects such as 'Baneque' (2016); 'Solaris' (2017), which mixes Soviet sci-fi and Andean cosmology; 'A Thousand Years of Nonlinear History' (a series started in 2018); 'Spacecraft' (2018); 'How Rivers Think' (2019); and 'Chewing Gum Codex' (2020).

A work of Santillán, 'The Intruder' (2015), drew controversy in England as the artist claimed to have shrunk the country by one inch after allegedly stealing one inch off the top of its highest mountain.

In early 2021 Santillán was announced as one of the five artists commissioned by the Holt/Smithson Foundation to create a new project for an island acquired by Robert Smithson in 1972. The other four artists are Tacita Dean, Renée Green, Sky Hopinka, and Joan Jonas.

== Early life and academics ==
Santillán began as a self-taught artist and writer in Guayaquil, Ecuador. In 1999 he joined the longstanding writing workshop of Miguel Donoso Pareja where, for a period of three years, Santillán focused on short stories. In 2002 he held his first solo exhibition Art for Dogs at the Galería Madeleine Hollaender, in the same city. There is no documentation of this first solo show since the exhibition was exclusively aimed at dogs and no humans were allowed to step inside the gallery. That same year, in collaboration with other young artists, Santillán co-created the 'Lalimpia' collective, which exhibited at the Biennial de Cuenca of 2003 and 2007, and the Havana Biennial of 2009. In 2004 Santillán studied at the Instituto de Artes del Ecuador (ITAE), however his bachelor's degree, in Design and Audiovisual Production, was obtained at the Escuela Superior Politécnica del Litoral (ESPOL), also in Guayaquil, with a thesis on screenwriting for cinema.

In 2008 Santillán received a fellowship from Indiana University to pursue a Sculpture MFA. The following year, however, he had the opportunity to restart his Master's at the Sculpture + Extended Media Department, VCUArts, in Richmond, where he graduated in 2011. Santillán has attended residencies at Skowhegan, Jan van Eyck Academie, Fondazione Ratti, Delfina Foundation, Leiden Astronomical Observatory, and NIAS. He has taught at the University of the Arts (UArts), Instituto de Artes del Ecuador (ITAE), and currently at AKV St. Joost.

== Antimundo ==
Santillán's philosophy of "Antimundo" combines scifi, indigenous worlding, and cybernetics together in his artwork. The researchers who have engaged in collaborations with his practice are part of institutions such as Leiden University's Biology Department (NL), Nietzsche Archive (DE), Maastricht University's Science and Technology Studies (NL), KNAW (NL), and Leiden Astronomical Observatory (NL), where Santillán was an artist-in-residence for a year (2018–2019), an experience that has led him towards a more holistic 'sci-art' understanding.

== Artworks ==
Santillán has held solo exhibitions at MUAC (Mexico City), Kunstinstituut Melly (Rotterdam), Fundación Odeón (Bogota), Spazio Calderara (Milan), Château La Borie (Limoges), Copperfield Gallery (London), among others. His work has been part of group exhibitions at LACMA, Yokohama Triennale, Humboldt Forum, IMMA, Socrates Park, Île-de-France, SECCA, NRW Forum, among other venues.

A brief description of selected works by Santillán includes:

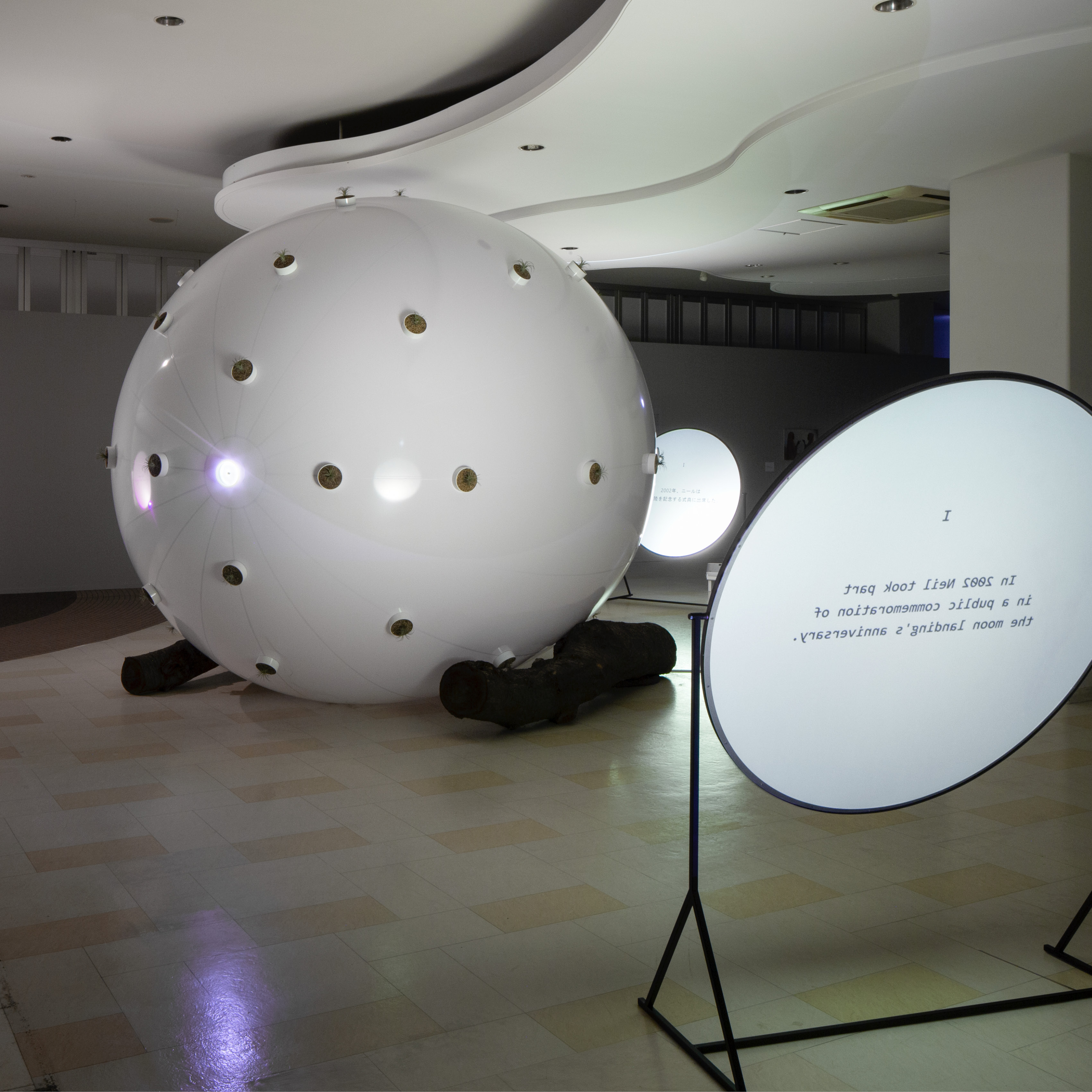
Chewing Gum Codex: Installation (inflatable, astronaut's DNA hosted in plants, and the process documentation presented as texts projected on three circular screens). Photograph by Otsuka Keita, courtesy of Yokohama Triennale 2020

Chewing Gum Codex (2018–2020). Installation (inflatable, astronaut's DNA hosted in plants, and the process documentation presented as texts projected on three circular screens).

In 1976 astronaut Neil Armstrong joined a scientific expedition to the Amazon; the main goal was to explore a large cave called “Tayos” in the Ecuadorian side of the rainforest. Seven years prior he had become the first human to step on the Moon. Along with many scientists, Ecuadorian soldiers in charge of the logistics, and a few members of the Shuar community (natives to that area of the rainforest), Armstrong ventured into this cave which encompasses hundreds of kilometers. One of the Ecuadorian soldiers, Francisco Guamán, was closely following the steps of Armstrong. His only interest was to collect anything that would be discarded by the astronaut, “whatever I could get" –he said– "would become valuable memorabilia” taken from one of the most famous people on Earth. It is not clear what type of items he expected, the truth is that a mundane piece of gum, which had been chewed by the astronaut, was all that he managed to gather. After hearing rumours about this story, in 2018 Santillan tracked down the family of Guamán –who had already passed away– to ask about it. The soldier's granddaughter confirmed the story and proceeded to retrieve the little piece of old, chewed gum from a box. She entrusted Santillan with it.

For Chewing Gum Codex human DNA, enclosed in the gum chewed by the astronaut, has been extracted and synthesized. This genetic material has been consequently inserted in the genome of plants, which are part of the installation. Considering that plants deal better with zero-gravity conditions, which are extremely harsh for humans, Chewing Gum Codex suggests the possibility of an interspecies astronaut as a plausible way for long-term traveling through outer space. In other words, in the future Armstrong could return to outer space, this time traveling inside plants.

How Rivers Think (2018). Water and plants from the Amazon gathered and sealed within 80 customised slides.

While canoeing down a river in the Amazon rainforest (called ‘Kushuimi’ by the native Shuars) Santillan took samples of the water and little floating fragments of the rainforest. These many river samples, taken along the way, were then poured inside customized slides. Consequently, they have been sealed, preserving each of them as living ecosystems. The title of this piece refers to the groundbreaking "How Forests Think" written by anthropologist Eduardo Kohn, based on his field research in the Ecuadorian Amazon.

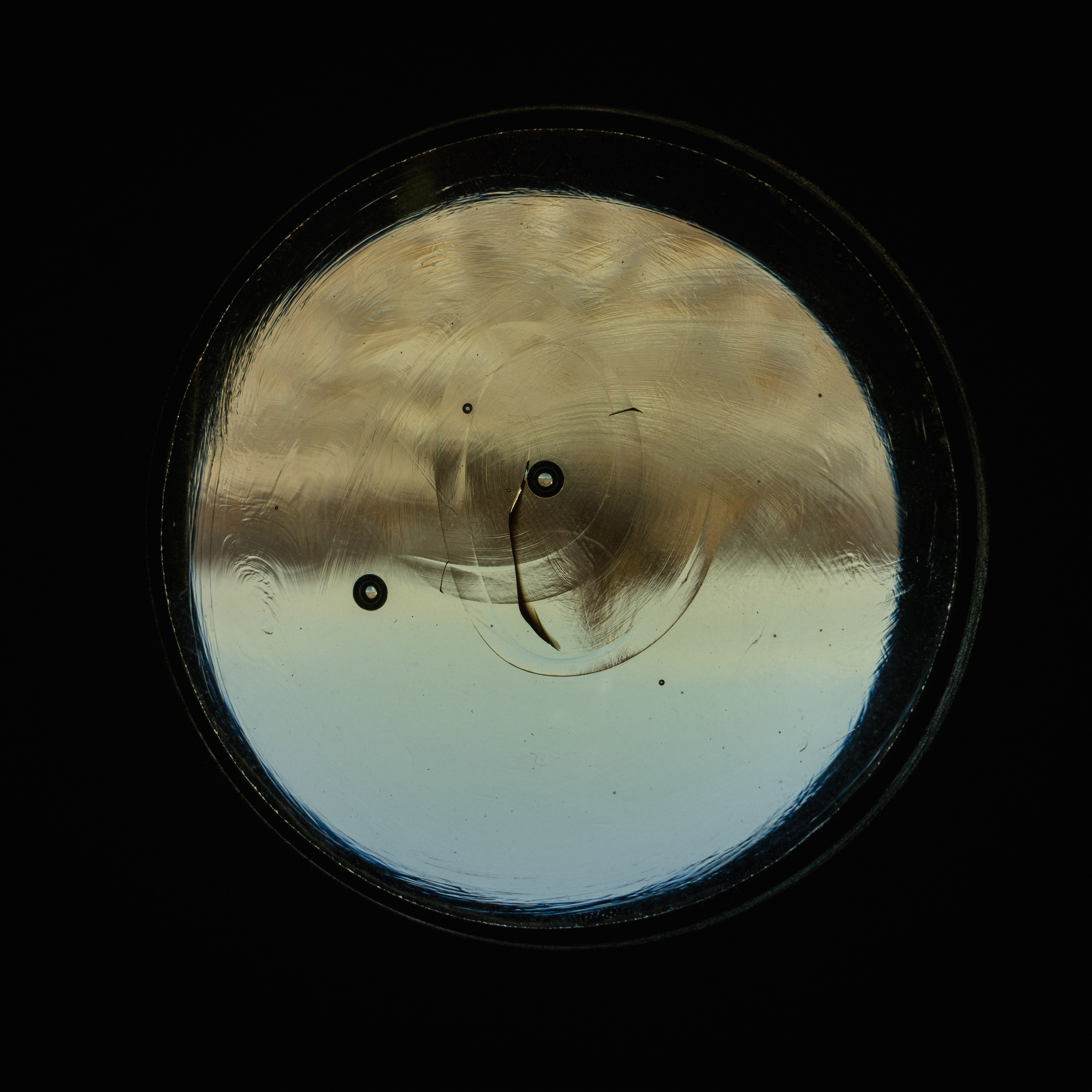
Solaris: Installation: A photographic lens made from sand of the Atacama Desert; and, an analog slide projection showing the 24 photographs produced by means of that lens when photographing the same desert. 2017

Solaris (2017). A photographic lens made from sand of the Atacama Desert; and, an analog slide projection showing the 24 photographs produced by means of that lens when photographing the same desert.

The Atacama Desert, in Chile, is the most arid place on Earth; its atmospheric conditions make it the perfect site for astronomical observations. Over time this immense territory has hosted many different human populations, including the Incas, and nowadays impressive telescopes are installed there. For Solaris, sand gathered at the Atacama Desert was first melted; becoming glass. This glass was then turned into photographic lenses. These ‘desert eyes’ were brought back to the Atacama desert and used to photograph its landscape. The captured images go beyond representing the landscape; in Solaris, the desert is an observing subject rather than a passive object to be looked at. Solaris takes its inspiration from the sci-fi classic of the same title, by Polish writer Stanislaw Lem, which explored a potential type of intelligence that does not derive from a brain, but rather, from the sea of a distant planet called Solaris.

Baneque (2016). A crystallised phantom island; salt water crystals 10x6x7cm displayed on a glass sheet 200x200x1cm.

Upon landing, the Taíno natives told Columbus of an island called Baneque, which had all the richness he was searching for. Based on their indications, the sailor devoted the following two months searching for an island that does not exist. In the area corresponding to the Atlantic Ocean there is a hole in the map drawn by the European sailor. This hole, which has the shape of an island, is the only missing part of the map. For Santillan, this tiny missing area of the map inevitably meant a hint of the missing island. If charted, the hole in Columbus' map is located 4.2 miles into the ocean. Santillan traveled to this location, where he gathered over 100 litres of sea water. In the following days this water was left to naturally evaporate; crystals and minerals then began appearing. At last, the lost island has revealed itself.
