= Political ontology =

Political ontology is an approach within anthropology to understand the process of how practices, entities (human and non-human), and concepts come into being or are enacted. The field takes as its focus 'conflicts involving different assumptions about 'what exists,'" over metaphysical entities, how to understand ecosystems and environment, the nature of animals and plants, and how communities collectively adjudicate what is real. Political ontology emerged as part of the ontological turn, particularly in the works by Mario Blaser, Marisol de la Cadena and Eduardo Viveiros de Castro.

== Definition ==
Political ontology is not concerned with presenting what is real as the more accurate understanding of "what is there" as a meta-ontological narrative. It is concerned with the possibilities of claiming what is there and showing how what is real is always in a process of contention. In this sense, political ontology is not concerned with what is the ultimate reality, instead is interested in making visible the multiplicity of ontologies. Political ontology is not concerned with independent realities, but it is interested in the process of reality-making and enacting of worlds through practices.

Political ontology recognizes the division between nature and culture as constitutive of modern ontology. From the political ontology point of view, this modern ontology cannot be taken for granted as a universal division. Political ontology does not assume that there is a single world and that the multiplicity of differences are just cultural. Instead, political ontology takes those differences as different ways in which worlds are enacted. These differences between "what is real" are interrelated with power dynamics that reproduce modern ontology as the dominant and Indigenous ontologies as cultural differences. In this sense, political ontology is concerned with the negotiations and conflicts between worlds and how these worlds exist and interact with each other.

Political ontology shows how reality is enacted as equivocal or as a “communicative disjuncture that takes place, not between those who share a common world but rather those whose worlds or ontologies are different”. This communicative disjuncture usually occurs when an ontology or world is presupposed as universal. Because then the differences between “what is there” are based on knowledge or culture and not based on different enactments of worlds. These misunderstandings between modern and non-modern ontologies show how what is constructed as a fact within a worlding is an entanglement of the performativity of objectivity and subjectivity as well as of morality and politics. Mainly political ontology is concerned with the power dynamics that emerge from recognizing the notion of multiple ontologies.

== Modern ontology ==
It is relevant to distinguish how modern ontology constantly recognizes differences as a cultural variation of the same world suppressing the possibility of the enactment of other worlds. The understanding of difference as culture privilege the understanding of a one-world reality that is “not clouded by culture (with lowercase c), and this access is premised precisely on recognizing the ontological difference between what is Culture and what is nature: a distinction that other cultures do not have”. In this sense cultural differences as multiculturalism function as a way to ensure that the performance of other worlds does not contest the modern one-world ontology.

“The importance that protecting the unity of reality “out there” has for the modern ontology becomes evident if one considers that the consequence of accepting the existence of multiple ontologies or worlds would be the end of the “Internal Great Divide” between culture and nature and therefore of the fundamental characteristic that differentiates (and supposedly makes superior) the moderns in relation to the “others”

== Radical difference ==
The power move of political ontology is to take seriously the differences as ways of enacting different worlds and to show the limits of modern ontology. Political ontology aims to recuperate radical difference as a way to escape the all-encompassing modernity. Radical difference is a relational condition that emerges from the enactment of equivocal worlds that exceed modern categories of understanding. This does not mean that the process of enacting worlds implies coherence and purity, to enact a world implies connections to other worlds but these connections do not revoke the radical differences between them.

== Pluriverse and multiple ontologies ==
Political ontology offers a framework to understand the emergence of multiple ontologies through the concept of the pluriverse. According to Blaser, the “pluriverse constituted by intra-acting worldings that share partial connections. Thus, while worldings are co-emergent, they do not share an overarching principle that would make their entanglement a universe. Rather their partial connections often constitute the sites in which it is possible to discern how what is brought into existence by certain worlding might interfere and conflict with what is brought into existence by another''. The key proposition of the pluriverse is that there is not an overarching principle that makes the multiplicities of ontologies into one single universe.

== Critics ==
One of the critics of political ontology is that the enactment of worldings seems to be invariable. The notion of non-modern ontologies as static reinstates the Eurocentric tendency to define non-modern as an image of the modern. Therefore, the changes can only come from the outside of the non-modern that is to say from the modern world. There is also another assumption that is relevant to unstate that is based on the notion that non-modern is better in terms of societies that are egalitarian or non-hierarchical. This is another assumption that reinstates non-moderns as the past of modern societies. In this sense, it is important to think about the enactment of worldings as Blaser quotes from a teacher and mentor Yshiro:

“not all stories (or accounts) are to be told or enacted just anywhere; every situation requires its own story. Telling just any story without attending to what the situation requires is sheer and recklessness. Thus, figuring out where, when, and how to do difference and sameness as the circumstances require is to me the key challenge of doing political ontology”.
