= Roy Wagner =

American cultural anthropologist

Roy Wagner (October 2, 1938 – September 10, 2018) was an American cultural anthropologist who made major contributions to symbolic anthropology, kinship theory, and the study of Melanesian societies. He is best known for his theoretical work on cultural invention, myth analysis (particularly "symbolic obviation"), figure-ground reversal, and the concept of "reverse anthropology." His book The Invention of Culture (1975; expanded 1981) has been widely regarded as a foundational text in late twentieth-century anthropology and is recognized as a precursor to the discipline's ontological turn.

== Background ==
Wagner received a B.A. in Medieval History from Harvard University in 1961 and a Ph.D. in anthropology from the University of Chicago in 1966, where he studied under David M. Schneider. He taught at Southern Illinois University and Northwestern University before joining the University of Virginia in the early 1970s, where he served multiple terms as department chair and taught until his death in 2018. He resided in Charlottesville, Virginia.

== Fieldwork and career ==
Wagner conducted long-term fieldwork at two major sites in Papua New Guinea. Beginning in the early 1960s, he worked among the Daribi of the Southern Highlands Province, which resulted in his first major ethnographic works, The Curse of Souw (1967) and Habu: The Innovation of Meaning in Daribi Religion (1972). He later established a second long-term fieldsite among the Usen Barok people of New Ireland, resulting in Asiwinarong: Ethos, Image, and Social Power Among the Usen Barok of New Ireland (1986). Wagner's deep engagement with these two Melanesian societies provided the ethnographic foundation for his theoretical innovations in symbolic anthropology, kinship analysis, and his concepts of fractal personhood and holographic worldview.

In 2011, Justin Shaffner accompanied Wagner for a month-long visit to Brazil, shortly after the Portuguese translation of The Invention of Culture appeared. In Manaus, Rio de Janeiro, and elsewhere, Wagner engaged in what he termed "symmetric anthropological exchanges" with Amazonian shamans and Indigenous leaders, including Davi Kopenawa Yanomami and Iginio Tenorio Tuyuka, as well as with students and scholars who found particular inspiration in his argument that anthropology and Indigenous knowledge should involve a "reciprocity of perspectives" among equals.

== Major contributions ==
=== The Invention of Culture ===
In The Invention of Culture (1975), Wagner argued that culture is not a bounded object discovered by anthropologists but is continually produced through creative acts of interpretation and analogy. He critiqued what he identified as a Western "asymmetry" where "Nature" is treated as a singular, innate reality and "Culture" as a set of many arbitrary human interpretations. Wagner argued that Western anthropologists often erroneously project this distinction onto other societies, making other peoples' cultural orders refer to Western concepts of Nature.

=== Reverse anthropology and reciprocity of perspectives ===
To counter this asymmetry, Wagner proposed that ethnographic understanding should be recognized as a reciprocal encounter between two different "anthropologies." He argued that the people being studied possess their own systematic frameworks through which they conceptualize the human, themselves, and the other. This approach, which became known as "reverse anthropology," allows for a symmetrical description where the anthropologist's conceptual framework is as much a subject of invention as that of the people they study, treating the conceptual framework of Indigenous interlocutors as a peer to that of the anthropologist.

Wagner's notion of "reciprocity of perspectives" challenged the conventional subject-object relationship in ethnography, proposing instead that both anthropologist and interlocutor are simultaneously observer and observed, each constructing an anthropology of the other. This theoretical move anticipated many themes in contemporary reflexive and ontological turn.

=== Symbolic obviation and the "talk that turns back" ===
Wagner developed a comprehensive theory of symbols and semiotics that applies across any genre—including speech, thought, and ritual—and across any cultural tradition. Central to this is symbolic obviation, a method for analyzing how symbolic systems create and relate two distinct realms:

- The Innate (the "given" or "natural"): That which is perceived as existing independently of human effort.
- The Contrived (the "artificial" or "arbitrary"): That which is consciously created through human action.

Wagner attributed the conceptual basis of symbolic obviation to Daribi intellectual traditions, particularly to his teacher Yapenugiai. He described the method as a transposition of the Daribi concept of porigi (po begerama pusabo po), which translates approximately as "the talk that turns back on itself as it is spoken." In this formulation, form and content are productively fused: the formal strategy of symbolic expression creates meaning through self-reference rather than external description.

Rather than treating symbols as linear signs with fixed meanings, obviation traces how symbolic elements displace and transform one another in sequences, functioning as a figure-ground reversal where symbols posit information and then eclipse or conceal the artifice of that positioning. Wagner illustrated this through analysis of Daribi myths, showing how narrative elements sequentially transform and "obviate" (render unnecessary or cancel out) previous elements, creating a self-contained symbolic cycle. Unlike structuralist analysis, which seeks underlying binary oppositions, obviation traces how symbols actively generate and then collapse meaning through their own internal dynamics.

This approach, detailed in Lethal Speech: Daribi Myth as Symbolic Obviation (1978) and Symbols That Stand for Themselves (1986), provides a method of description that allows each cultural order to be understood as a symmetrical, self-referential whole, positioning anthropology outside the Western paradigm of "one nature, many cultures."

=== Kinship, analogy, and fractal personhood ===
In his work on kinship, including the influential article "Analogic kinship: a Daribi example" (1977), Wagner proposed that kinship relations could be understood analogically—as transformations across symbolic domains—rather than solely as genealogical structures or descent systems. This represented a significant departure from conventional kinship studies influenced by British structural-functionalism.

Wagner employed unconventional analogies to explain kinship dynamics, notably comparing kinship strategies to chess moves. In his analogy of the Knight-Fork—a chess move where a knight simultaneously attacks two pieces by "jumping" between different registers—Wagner illustrated how kinship operates across multiple frames or domains at once, requiring active participation from both analyst and participant to create meaning. He viewed kinship not as a static pattern but as a dynamic "strategy" or "mating" of meanings.

His later work introduced the concept of fractal personhood, suggesting that individuals and social groups manifest self-similar patterns at different scales of social organization. This concept, developed in dialogue with Marilyn Strathern's work on Melanesian sociality, became central to what became known as the "New Melanesian Ethnography."

=== Holographic worldview and complexity theory ===
In An Anthropology of the Subject: Holographic Worldview in New Guinea (2001), Wagner developed the concept of holographic worldview, arguing that in Melanesian cosmologies, each part contains and reflects the whole, similar to a hologram where every fragment contains the complete image. This work extended his earlier insights on fractal personhood to suggest that Melanesian persons, clans, and cosmological structures operate through principles of self-similarity and recursive containment.

Wagner's attention to self-similarity, recursion, and emergence helped inspire anthropological engagement with chaos theory and complexity theory. His contribution to the edited volume On the Order of Chaos explored how non-linear dynamics and emergent patterns could inform anthropological analysis. This work influenced scholars seeking to apply insights from complexity science to social and cultural phenomena.

== Reception and influence ==
=== Influence on the ontological turn ===
Wagner's work is widely recognized as foundational to anthropology's ontological turn, though this connection was largely made retrospectively. His insistence that different peoples possess fundamentally different realities—not merely different interpretations of a single reality—anticipated the core premise of ontological anthropology by several decades.

Eduardo Viveiros de Castro's concept of Amerindian perspectivism and Marilyn Strathern's work on Melanesian partial connections both draw heavily on Wagner's notion of "reverse anthropology" and his critique of Western nature/culture distinctions. Martin Holbraad and Morten Axel Pedersen have argued that Wagner's method of "analogic anthropology" provides a practical methodology for ontological ethnography.

Wagner's work is central to the Abaeté framework in Brazilian anthropology, which synthesizes his theories with those of Eduardo Viveiros de Castro, Marilyn Strathern, and Bruno Latour to argue for a "symmetric anthropology."

Other anthropologists significantly influenced by Wagner include Jadran Mimica, James Weiner, Alberto Corsín Jiménez, Annelise Riles, and Andrew Moutu. Moutu's Names Are Thicker Than Blood: Kinship and Ownership Amongst the Iatmul (2013) applies Wagnerian insights on analogy and obviation to Sepik River ethnography, demonstrating the continuing influence of Wagner's methods on Melanesian studies. In the preface to The Gender of the Gift (1988), Strathern credited Wagner's writings as being among the most significant to her theoretical development.

=== Reception in Brazil ===
Wagner's work gained considerable influence in Brazilian anthropology following the 2010 Portuguese translation of The Invention of Culture (A invenção da cultura, published by Cosac Naify and translated by Marcela Coelho de Souza and Alexandre Morales). The book resonated particularly with scholars working in Amazonian ethnography and with Indigenous intellectuals seeking theoretical frameworks that recognized Indigenous knowledge systems as equal to Western epistemologies. Wagner's theoretical approach aligned closely with the principles of symmetric anthropology being developed by the Núcleo de Antropologia Simétrica (NAnSI) and associated scholars at the Museu Nacional in Rio de Janeiro.

During his 2011 visit to Brazil with Justin Shaffner, Wagner engaged in symmetric anthropological exchanges with Amazonian shamans and Indigenous leaders, including Davi Kopenawa Yanomami and Iginio Tenorio Tuyuka, in Manaus, Rio de Janeiro, and other cities. In Manaus, he met with Indigenous Amazonian anthropologists associated with the Núcleo de Estudos da Amazônia Indígena (NEAI) at the Federal University of Amazonas, including João Paulo Barreto, Jaime Diakara, João Kennedy (Bu'u), and the late Higino Tenório. These encounters were documented in the 2023 American Anthropologist obituary, which noted that Indigenous interlocutors found particular value in Wagner's concept of "reciprocity of perspectives," seeing it as an affirmation of Indigenous epistemologies. Wagner's work has been carried forward in the "symmetric turn" of Brazilian anthropology and has been particularly influential in the development of the Indigenous anthropology research program at NEAI, which recognizes Indigenous knowledge practices as anthropological sciences analogous to Euro-American ones.

The Brazilian journal Ilha Revista de Antropologia published a special thematic section, "Seminário de Raposa, pensando com Roy Wagner" (2010), dedicated to engaging with his theoretical contributions to anthropology.

== Major publications ==
=== Books ===
- The Curse of Souw: Principles of Daribi Clan Definition and Alliance in New Guinea. Chicago: University of Chicago Press, 1967. ISBN 9780226869742
- Habu: The Innovation of Meaning in Daribi Religion. Chicago: University of Chicago Press, 1972. ISBN 9780226869728
- The Invention of Culture. Chicago: University of Chicago Press, 1975 (revised and expanded edition 1981). ISBN 9780226869339
- Lethal Speech: Daribi Myth as Symbolic Obviation. Ithaca, N.Y.: Cornell University Press, 1978. ISBN 9780801411939
- Asiwinarong: Ethos, Image, and Social Power Among the Usen Barok of New Ireland. Princeton: Princeton University Press, 1986. ISBN 9780691094212
- Symbols That Stand for Themselves. Chicago: University of Chicago Press, 1986. ISBN 9780226869292
- An Anthropology of the Subject: Holographic Worldview in New Guinea and Its Meaning and Significance for the World of Anthropology. Berkeley: University of California Press, 2001. ISBN 9780520925823
- Coyote Anthropology. Lincoln: University of Nebraska Press, 2010. ISBN 9780803230071
- The Logic of Invention. Chicago: University of Chicago Press, 2018. ISBN 9780226595504

=== Selected articles and book chapters ===
- "Scientific and Indigenous Papuan Conceptualizations of the Innate: A Semiotic Critique of the Ecological Perspective". In Bayliss-Smith, T. and Feachem, R. (eds), Subsistence and Survival: Rural Ecology in the Pacific, pp. 385–410. New York: Academic Press, 1977.
- "Analogic kinship: a Daribi example". American Ethnologist, 4(4): 623–642, 1977.
- "The fractal person". In Godelier, M. and Strathern, M. (eds), Big Men and Great Men: Personifications of Power in Melanesia, pp. 159–173. Cambridge: Cambridge University Press, 1991.
- "Anthropology beyond culture". In Fox, R. and King, B. (eds), Anthropology Beyond Culture, pp. 219–233. Oxford: Berg, 2002.
- "Chaos, the Mannered, and the Multitude". In Damon, F. H. and Mosko, M. S. (eds), On the Order of Chaos: Social Anthropology and the Science of Chaos, pp. 237–258. New York: Berghahn Books, 2005.

== Secondary literature ==
=== Critical studies and collections ===
- Bashkow, Ira and Shaffner, Justin (2023). "Roy Wagner (1938–2018)". American Anthropologist, 125(2): 463–469.
- Crook, Tony and Shaffner, Justin (2011). "Roy Wagner's 'Chess of kinship': An opening gambit". HAU: Journal of Ethnographic Theory, 1(1): 159–164.
- Holbraad, Martin and Pedersen, Morten Axel (2017). "Analogic Anthropology: Wagner's Inventions and Obviations". In The Ontological Turn: An Anthropological Exposition, pp. 17–38. Cambridge: Cambridge University Press.
- Ingham, John M. (2007). "Simplicity and complexity in anthropology". On the Horizon, 15(1): 7–14.
- Murray, David and Robbins, Joel, eds. (2002). "Reinventing the Invention of Culture" (special issue). Social Analysis, 46(1).
- Stassinos, Elizabeth (2009). "Obviating Roy Wagner: The Pidik of Science Fiction". AAA Annual Meeting, George W. Stocking Jr. Symposium.
- "Seminário de Raposa, pensando com Roy Wagner" (special section). Ilha Revista de Antropologia, 12(1): 1–160, 2010.

=== Applications and extensions ===
- Corsín Jiménez, Alberto (2003). "On Space as a Capacity". Journal of the Royal Anthropological Institute, 9(1): 137–153.
- Damon, Frederick H. and Mosko, Mark S., eds. (2005). On the Order of Chaos: Social Anthropology and the Science of Chaos. New York: Berghahn Books.
- Mimica, Jadran (1988). Intimations of Infinity: The Cultural Meanings of the Iqwaye Counting System and Number. Oxford: Berg Publishers.
- Mimica, Jadran (2003). "The Death of a Strong, Great, Bad Man: An Ethnography of Soul Incorporation". Oceania, 73(4): 260–286.
- Moutu, Andrew (2013). Names Are Thicker Than Blood: Kinship and Ownership Amongst the Iatmul. Oxford: Oxford University Press.
- Santos, Gilton Mendes dos and Dias, C. M. (2009). "Ciência da floresta: Por uma antropologia no plural, simétrica e cruzada". Revista de Antropologia, 52(1): 137–160.
- Strathern, Marilyn (1988). The Gender of the Gift: Problems with Women and Problems with Society in Melanesia. Berkeley: University of California Press.
- Viveiros de Castro, Eduardo (2004). "Perspectival Anthropology and the Method of Controlled Equivocation". Tipití: Journal of the Society for the Anthropology of Lowland South America, 2(1): 3–22.
- Viveiros de Castro, Eduardo and Goldman, Marcio (2012). "Introduction to Post-Social Anthropology: Networks, Multiplicities, and Symmetrizations". HAU: Journal of Ethnographic Theory, 2(1): 421–433.

== See also ==
- Symbolic anthropology
- Ontological turn
- Perspectivism
- Melanesian anthropology
- David M. Schneider
- Marilyn Strathern
- Eduardo Viveiros de Castro
