= Thomas Højrup =

Thomas Højrup (born 1953) is a Danish ethnologist. Højrup is Professor of Ethnology at the University of Copenhagen. His primary focus is the development of new concepts of life-mode analysis, with conceptual history and politics also prominently figured in his work. He has directed a large scale research project on the formation of life modes and welfare states. Other research interests include epistemological questions in the social sciences, and everyday life of distinct life-modes in modern Europe and in the fishing industry.

== Selected publications ==
- 2003: State, Culture and Life-Modes. Ashgate, Aldershot.
- 2001: (With Kirsten Monrad Hansen) An economic Rationale for Inshore Fishing: Simple Commodity Production and the Life-Mode Approach. In: Inshore Fisheries Management, eds. D.Symes & J.Phillipson, Kluwer Academic Publishers, Netherlands.
- 2002: Ethnologie und Politik. Das aristotelische Erbe in den Kulturwissenschaften. In: Zeitschrift für Volkskunde 2002 II, Waxmann
- 2000: (With Kirsten Monrad Hansen) Glavnoje otlitshie. Modelj zjizni sovremennogo menedzjera I nauka obnovlenija. Knigoizdatelstvo Vesemirnoje Slovo, Sankt Petersborg.
- 1998: Problemi gnoseologii, istorii kultur I teorii gosudarstva. Knigoizdatelstvo Vesemirnoje Slovo, Sankt Petersborg.
- Højrup, Thomas (2017). State, Culture and Life-Modes : the Foundations of Life-Mode Analysis. Routledge revivals. Milton: Routledge. ISBN 9781138718517. OCLC 1089432353.

=== Thesis ===
- Højrup, Thomas (1983). The concept of life-mode : a form-specifying mode of analysis applied to contemporary Western Europe (Doctoral dissertation). Ethnologia Scandinavica. Arlöv Berlings, University of Copenhagen.

== See also ==
- List of scholars of ethnology
