= Ontological turn =

2000s philosophers' and anthropologists' increased interest in ontology

The ontological turn is an increased interest in ontology within a number of philosophical and academic disciplines during the early 2000s. The ontological turn in anthropology is not concerned with anthropological notions of culture, epistemology, nor world views. Instead, the ontological turn generates interest in being in the world and accepts that different world views are not simply different representations of the same world. More specifically, the ontological turn refers to a change in theoretical orientation according to which differences are understood not in terms of a difference in world views but a difference in worlds, and all of these worlds are of equal validity.

== Definitions ==
Ontology is the study of reality as constructed in both human and non-human worlds. Conversely, ontology has also been understood as a process of "becoming". Finally, ontology has also been defined as the set of historical circumstances through which individuals comprehend reality. However, this last definition in particular has garnered significant critics due to its similarity to definitions of culture.

=== Philosophical influence ===
The field of ontology corresponds to the philosophical study of being. This focus on being draws on Martin Heidegger's insights into the specific nature of what it means to "be" in the world. Heidegger's theorizing on the fundamental nature of being drew on ontological ideals that emerged from the traditions of the Platonic school. In this view, the mind or the experience of being a human, does not refer to a singular entity. Instead, the mind refers to a collection of events, life events, or material objects an individual experiences. Thus, ontology relates the experience of being in the world. Further, interest in ontology is associated with a greater understanding of existence, reality, becoming, and how these concepts relate to broad categories of entities.

== In anthropology ==
Within the field of anthropology, ontological ideas first began emerging around the 1990s. However, the first influence of ontological understandings within anthropology emerged in the work of Roy Wagner, Marilyn Strathern, and Eduardo Viveiros de Castro. Following these initial deliberations, the ontological turn took hold of British anthropology. From there, North American anthropologists began considering how ontology might be useful in ethnographic research. The application of ontological frameworks really gained popularity following 2010 and were brought to national anthropological attention at the 2013 Annual Meeting of the American Anthropological Association in Chicago, where ontology became the focus of several sessions there. After the conference one of the oldest and prominent anthropology blog, Savage Minds, declared ontology to be "the next big thing" in anthropological theory. This burgeoning interest in ontology spawned a number of articles that highlighted the usefulness of ontological premises in anthropological research.

The concept of ontology and what people mean by ontology is diverse; therefore, tracing the ontological turn in anthropology remains difficult. However, if ontology refers to the study of reality then ontological anthropology incorporates theoretical and methodological elements of anthropology to a study of being or existence. Ethnographies are the most widely utilized method in anthropological research. While, in a theoretical sense, anthropology has contributed greatly to the concept of culture. These two elements in anthropology have broadened philosophical notions of ontology so that ontological anthropology is not simply about the world; rather, it is about the experience of being a human in the world. Moreover, ontological anthropology is explicitly concerned with how humans communicate and interact with a host of non-human actors. For example, as a trained biologist turned anthropologist, Donna Haraway insists on including other beings, both human and non-human, in her accounts of living with pets. Finally, ontological anthropology is not claiming that individuals or communities are living in distinct universes and by crossing into a different setting you are suddenly in a different reality. Instead, ontological anthropologists are claiming that we "should allow difference or alterity to challenge our understanding of the very categories of nature and culture themselves".

=== Other turns in anthropology ===
Anthropology as a field has experienced a number of turns in its history, including the linguistic turn, the reflexive turn, the temporal turn, the affective turn, the literary turn, and the post-human turn. The ontological turn presents differences in cultural phenomena not as different interpretations of a singular, natural world. Rather, the ontological turn in anthropology suggests that there are alternate realities and other ways of beings that exist in parallel with our own. The proponents of this movement claim that this way of framing cultural difference is the first attempt anthropologists have made in taking the beliefs of their interlocutors "seriously" or "literally". Critics of the ontological turn argue that claims of different worlds tend towards essentialism.

Political ontology is another theoretical development associated with the ontological turn.

=== Narrow turn towards ontology ===
The works of French authors Philippe Descola and Bruno Latour, and Brazilian author Eduardo Viveiros de Castro gravitated towards what has been termed "a narrow ontological turn". This narrow ontological turn produced much concern and curiosity within North American anthropology.

==== Descola's beyond nature ====
Philippe Descola in his work among the Amazonian Achuar suggested that the category of nature is not a human universal and therefore, should not be considered a line of anthropological inquiry. The domain of "nature", Descola argues has emerged from modern, Western notions that intend to posit "nature" as ontologically real. Instead, Descola claims that "Other civilizations have devised different ways of detecting qualities among existents, resulting in other forms of organizing continuity and discontinuity between humans and nonhumans, of aggregating beings in collectives, of defining who or what is capable of agency and knowledge". Meaning Descola treats animism not as some sort of mistaken belief, but as an extension of social relationality to nonhuman actors. In this sense, Descola utilizes ontology as an elementary analytical tool to explore how worlds are constructed in a manner that is distinct from the way anthropologists generally discuss worldviews. Descola proposes that anthropology can utilize ontological frameworks to best account for how worlds are composed.

==== Viveiros de Castro's perspectivism ====
Eduardo Viveiros de Castro utilizes a framework perspectivism in his synthesis of Amazonian ethnographic literature. His discussion of Amazonian understandings takes into account how perspectives of human versus nonhuman are not inherently different. Viveiros de Castro's reflections on perspectivism lead him to conclude that we are dealing with a perspective that is fundamentally different from those which inform Western academic thought. Viveiros de Castro's approach inherently takes an ontological approach that "allows him to see more clearly the ways in which anthropology is founded on a nature/culture divide that posits nature as a sort of universal, unitary, and existent ground and culture as the infinitely variable form of representing nature."

==== Latour's modes of existence ====
Bruno Latour argues that researchers should not sort entities into the "social" world and the "natural" world. Latour argues that instead of predetermining what things are deemed as part of society and what things are deemed as part of nature, social scientists should view these categories as complex negotiations between people and their world. This resistance to the division between the social and natural is integral to ontological anthropology.

== Reception ==
Haidy Geismar, one of the critics of ontological anthropology, has claimed that in presenting others not as having different cultures, but in having different worlds, is just a novel form of essentialism. Further, many critics of ontological anthropology have demonstrated that this framework does not take difference as seriously as it claims to. Specifically, Pierre Charbonnier, Gildas Salmon, and Peter Skafish have brought attention to the fact that many ontological anthropologists have drawn similar conclusions to anthropologists not using ontological frameworks, while also utilizing much of the same theoretical bases in their arguments.

However, the ontologists have responded that many of these critiques are merely attempts to reproduce the status quo. In response to turn towards ontology a Group for Debates in Anthropological Theory's debate was held on 9 February 2008 in Manchester, on the motion 'Ontology is just another word for culture'. Speaking for the motion were Michael Carrithers (Durham) and Matei Candea (Cambridge), and against were Karen Sykes (Manchester) and Martin Holbraad (University College London). The final vote - 19 in favour, 39 against and six abstentions - reflected a general consensus that between culture and ontology, ontology might have something to contribute.

Marshall Sahlins echos this consensus in his claim that ontology "offers a radical change in the current anthropological trajectory—a paradigm shift if you will—that would overcome the present analytic disarray by what amounts to a planetary table of the ontological elements and the compounds they produce" in the forward to Beyond Nature and Culture. Sahlins celebrates how anthropology, through this ontological focus, will return to its true focus: the state of being other.

In 2025, a special issue of the Revue du MAUSS (one of France's leading social science journals) was devoted to the ontological turn, and drew up a rather negative assessment of the legacy of this moment, both for the French social sciences and for ecology. In the introduction, the editors summarize:

While in principle the elimination of the word nature is supposed to help us go beyond traditional ecological struggles and open up broader horizons, in the end it leads to nothing palpable, or rather [...] either to a liberal conservatism that leaves everything as it is (while turning to the Gospels), as with Bruno Latour, or to a rather anti-modern ecology, reversing all signs of modernity, following Viveiros de Castro. Or a simple environmentalism, celebrating living things but saying nothing about the social order required to sustain them. By dispensing with reading the authors of the ecological tradition and criticizing them rather than seeking to build bridges, the proponents of the Ontological Turn prove incapable of proposing a political project equal to the issues of the day. We could sum up some of these criticisms by saying that it is perilous to claim to save nature by asserting that it does not exist, and problematic to want to advance knowledge, and therefore science, by positing as a starting point that there is no objective reality. [...] By locking each culture or cultural zone into its own irreducible self-enclosure, it cannot propose any form of universal, even relative, except to say that we must pay attention to cultural differences, which is undeniable. It cannot therefore be the bearer of any political philosophy capable of countering the neoliberal ideology that is ravaging the planet and giving rise to increasingly fascistic dictatorships everywhere.
