= Eduardo Kohn =

Canadian anthropologist

Eduardo (né Edward) Kohn is Associate Professor of Anthropology at McGill University and winner of the 2014 Gregory Bateson Prize. He is best known for the book, How Forests Think.

== Work ==
Kohn's 2013 book, How Forests Think, has been described by Cambridge Professor of Anthropology Marilyn Strathern as "thought-leaping in the most creative sense," and "[a] supreme artifact of the human skill in symbolic thinking.". The work draws upon four years of ethnographic fieldwork with the Runa in the Upper Amazon in order to challenge the most basic assumptions of anthropological thought. Using the semiotic theory of Charles Sanders Peirce, Kohn proposes that all life forms, not only humans, engage in processes of signification and therefore should be considered as able to think and learn. Arguing that selfhood does not solely belong to humans, Kohn proposes that any entity which communicates through the use of signs can be considered a self, leading to a complex 'ecology of selves' of which humans and nonhumans are both a part. Kohn's work builds upon a growing body of literature, from authors such as Bruno Latour, Donna Haraway and Eduardo Viveiros de Castro, which seeks to take the social sciences beyond the limits of strictly human relations.

How Forests Think has been criticized for using a very weak definition of "thinking": "Under such a definition, a wide range of things could be said to think. However, this is no revolutionary discovery; it is simply a semantic shift giving the illusion of novelty." Moreover, it has been argued that Kohn's weak definition of thinking does not account for the phenomenon of anthropomorphism and animism discussed by Philippe Descola and others.

In 2014 HAU included an entire section based on a book symposium discussing How Forests Think including contributions from Bruno Latour and Philippe Descola.

== Publications ==
- Further Thoughts on Sylvan Thinking in Hau vol. 4 No. 2 (2014)
- How Forests Think: Towards an Anthropology Beyond the Human, University of California Press (2013)
- How dogs dream: Amazonian natures and the politics of transspecies engagement in American Ethnologist, Vol. 34, No. 1, pp. 3–24 (2007)
