= Randall H. McGuire =

American archaeologist (born 1951)

Dr. Randall H. McGuire
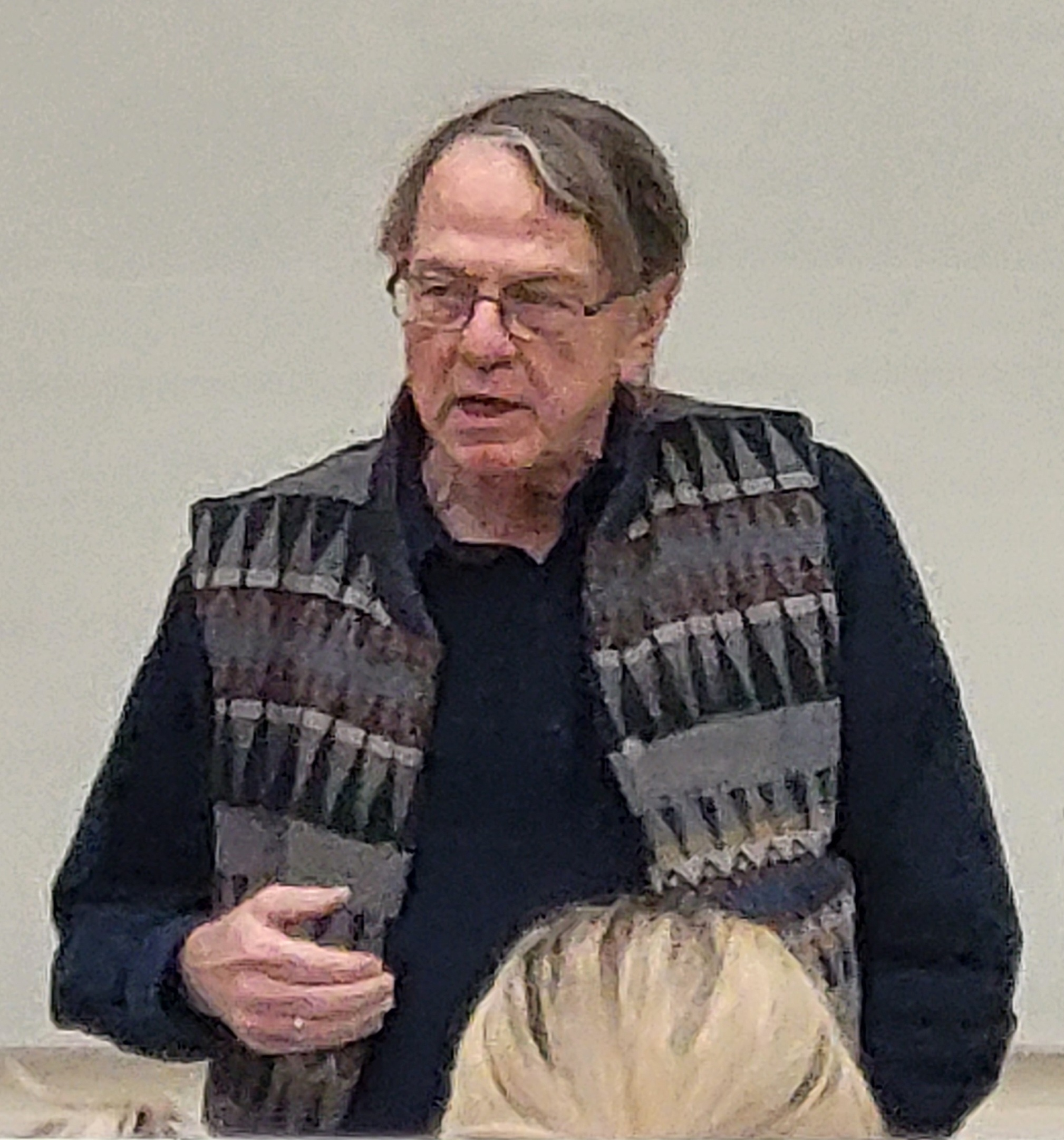
- Born: December 23, 1951 (age 74); Fort Collins, Colorado, United States
- Occupations: Distinguished Professor of Anthropology, Department of Anthropology, Binghamton University
- Years active: 1982–present

Academic background
- Education: Ph.D., University of Arizona

Academic work
- Main interests: Archaeology
- Website: http://bingweb.binghamton.edu/~rmcguire/index.html

Randall H. McGuire is an American archaeologist, known for his theoretical contributions to Marxist archaeology. He currently lectures in the Department of Anthropology at Binghamton University. McGuire completed his doctoral work in Anthropology at the University of Arizona in 1982, with a thesis directed by Michael Brian Schiffer entitled "The Prehistory of Southwestern Arizona: a Regional Research Design".

== Bibliography ==
=== Books ===
Title	Year	Co-author(s)	Publisher	ISBN
The Archaeology of Inequality	1991	Robert Paynter (edited volume)	Blackwell (Oxford)	
A Marxist Archaeology	1992	n/a	Academic Press (San Diego)	
Archaeology as Political Action	2008	n/a	University of California Press (Berkeley)	
The Archaeology of Class War: The Colorado Coalfield Strike of 1913-1914	2009	Karin Larkin (edited volume)	University of Colorado (Boulder)	
Entre Muros de Piedra	2009	Elisa Villalpando	Sonoran Cultural Center (Hermosillo)	
Ideologies in Archaeology	2011	Reinhard Bernbeck (edited volume)	University of Arizona Press (Tucson)	
Excavations at Cerro de Trincheras, Sonora, Mexico	2011	María Elisa Villalpando Canchola (edited volume)	Arizona State Museum (Tucson); Arizona State Museum Archaeological Series 204	
