= Brackette Williams =

American anthropologist

- Born: Brackette F. Williams; October 21, 1955 (age 70)
- Education: Cornell University; Johns Hopkins University; University of Arizona
- Scientific career
- Fields: Anthropology
- Workplaces: Duke University; Queens College, City University of New York; The New School; University of California, Berkeley; Johns Hopkins University; University of Chicago; University of Arizona

Brackette F. Williams is an American anthropologist, and Senior Justice Advocate, Open Society Institute. She is currently an associate professor of cultural anthropology at the University of Arizona.

Williams graduated from Cornell University with a BS, from the University of Arizona with a master's in Education, and from the Johns Hopkins University with a PhD in Cultural Anthropology. She has taught at Duke University, Queens College, the New School for Social Research, the University of California, Berkeley, the Johns Hopkins University, the University of Chicago, and the University of Arizona.

Her work has centered on the Caribbean region, and in particular, examined how racial and ethnic categories are reproduced in Guyana nationalism. Categories and classification systems - how they are developed, what basis they have in cultural contexts, and how they are put to use, by whom and for whom - have been a general theme in her work as well. Williams's ethnographic work on the categories informing capital punishment in the United States demonstrates has also been an interest. She was editor of the journal Transforming Anthropology.

== Awards ==
- 1997 MacArthur Fellows Program
- 2008 Soros Justice Fellowships

== Works ==
- Williams, Brackette F. 1989. "A Class Act: Anthropology and the Race to Nation Across Ethnic Terrain." Annual Review of Anthropology 18: 401– 444.
- Williams, Brackette F. 1991. Stains on My Name, War in My Veins: Guyana and the Politics of Cultural Struggle, Durham, NC: Duke University Press, ISBN 978-0-8223-1119-5.
- Williams, Brackette F. 1995. Classification Systems Revisited: Kinship, Caste, Race, and Nationality as the Flow of Blood and the Spread of Rights. In Naturalizing Power: Essays in Feminist Cultural Analysis, ed. Sylvia Yanagisako and Carol Delaney, 201-236. London: Routledge.
- Williams, Brackette F., ed. 1996. "A Race of Men, A Class of Women", Women out of place: the gender of agency and the race of nationality, Routledge, ISBN 978-0-415-91497-0.
- Williams, Brackette F. 2005. "Getting out of the Hole",South Atlantic Quarterly 104(3):481-499
- Williams, Brackette F. 2008. “‘Dominando’ os bárbaros: Barbados, ativismo abolicionista e classificação da pena de morte.” Revista Brasileira de Ciências Sociais 23 (68): 23-39.
