= Philippe Buc =

French historian

Philippe Buc is a French/American historian concentrating on religion and politics, mainly in the European Middle Ages. Since 2021 he is Professor of Medieval History at the Leiden University.

Buc did his undergraduate studies at Swarthmore College, graduating in 1982. He then attended the prestigious EHESS (quasi-university) in Paris between 1984 and December 2011, studying History and receiving his doctorate for his dissertation entitled "Potestas: prince, pouvoir, et peuple dans les commentaires de la Bible (Paris et France du Nord, 1100-1330") (loosely, "Potestas: Prince power and people in bible commentaries - Paris and northern France: 1100-1330"). The work was supervised by Jean-Claude Schmitt and informally but energetically by Jacques Le Goff.

He was a professor at Stanford University (USA) between 1990 and 2011. An important focus of his research is on Christian violence and cultures of violence shaped by Christianity. See Holy War, Martyrdom, and Terror (2015). Buc's book, The Dangers of Ritual (2001), garnered a lot of attention from early medieval historians for its commentary on the subject of ritual. In September 2011 he became Professor for Medieval History at the University of Vienna, Institut für Geschichte and Institut für Österreichische Geschichtsforschung. At around the same time he accepted US citizenship (while still retaining the French citizenship acquired by virtue of his birth in Paris).
