= Aihwa Ong =

American anthropologist (born 1950)

- 王愛華
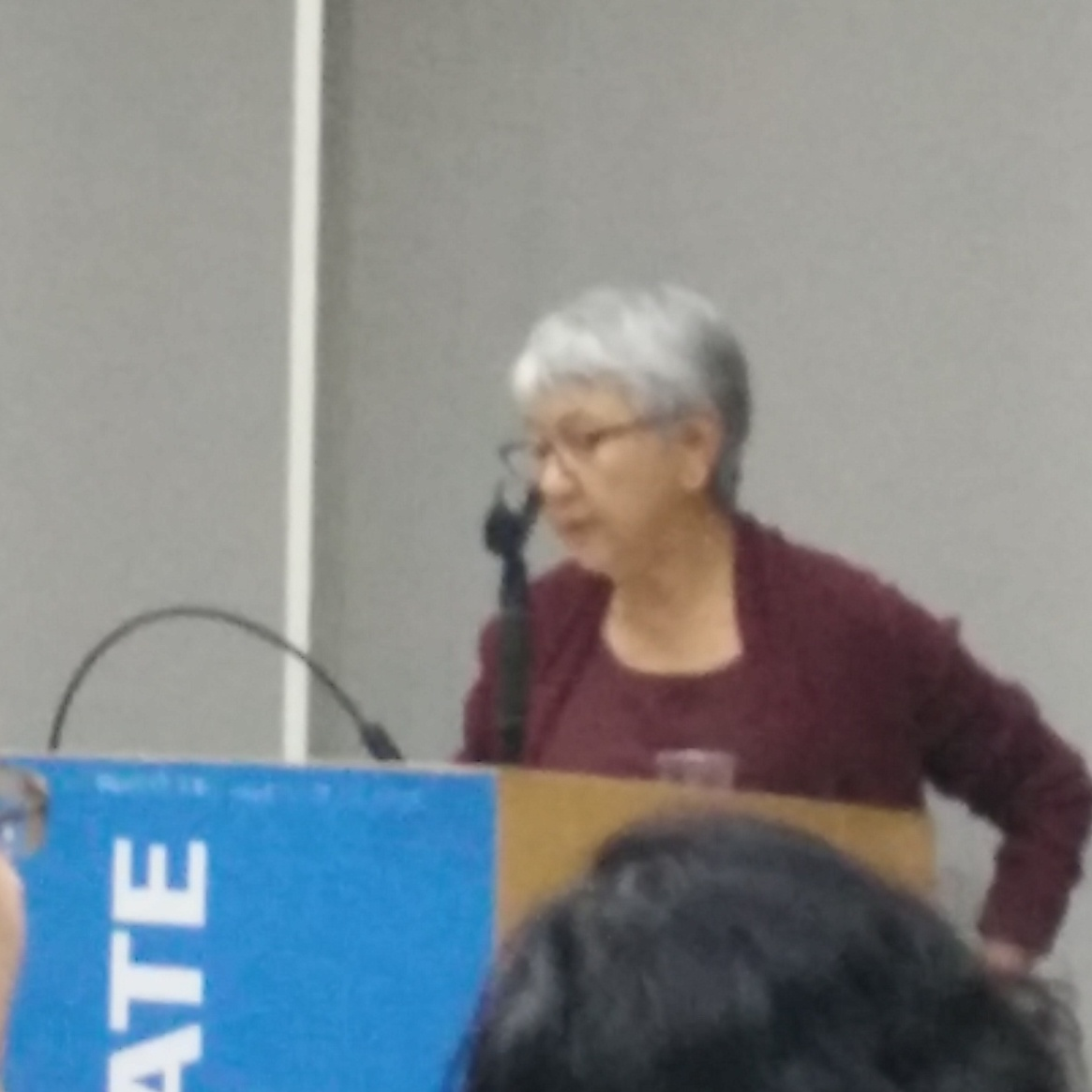
- Ong in 2016
- Born: February 1, 1950 (age 76); George Town, Penang, Federation of Malaya
- Occupation: Emeritus Professor of Anthropology
- Known for: Anthropologist, Professor & Author

Academic background
- Education: Barnard College (B.A.) Columbia University (Ph.D.)
- Thesis: Women and Industry: Malay Peasants in Coastal Selangor, 1975-80 (1982)
- Doctoral advisor: Joan Vincent, Myron Cohen, Robert F. Murphy

Academic work
- Discipline: Anthropology
- Sub-discipline: Sociocultural anthropology, anthropology of Southeast Asia
- Institutions: University of California, Berkeley
- Main interests: Science technology and society, anthropology of citizenship, neoliberalism, modernity
- Notable works: Spirits of Resistance and Capitalist Discipline: Factory Women in Malaysia; Neoliberalism as Exception: Mutations in Citizenship and Sovereignty; Buddha is Hiding: Refugees, Citizenship, the New America; Flexible Citizenship: The Cultural Logics of Transnationality; Global Assemblages: Technology, Politics, and Ethics as Anthropological Problems
- Notable ideas: Global assemblages, flexible citizenship, graduated sovereignty, fungible life

Aihwa Ong

Chinese name
- Traditional Chinese: 王愛華
- Hanyu Pinyin: Wáng Àihuá

Aihwa Ong (born February 1, 1950) is a professor emerita of anthropology at the University of California, Berkeley. She is well known for her interdisciplinary approach in investigations of globalization, modernity, and citizenship from Southeast Asia and China to California. Her notions of 'flexible citizenship', 'graduated sovereignty,' and 'global assemblages' have widely impacted conceptions of the global in modernity across the social sciences and humanities. She is specifically interested in the connection and links between an array of social sciences such as; sociocultural anthropology, urban studies, and science and technology studies, as well as medicine and the arts.

== Life and career ==
Ong was born in Penang, Malaysia to a Straits Chinese family in 1950. She received her B.A. in anthropology (1974) from Barnard College and earned her Ph.D. (1982) in anthropology from Columbia University. Her older brother, Nai Phuan Ong also went to Columbia University, earned a Ph.D. in physics at UC Berkeley, and is currently a Professor of Physics at Princeton University. Aihwa Ong started her career as a visiting lecturer at Hampshire College (1982–84) before joining the Department of Anthropology at the University of California Berkeley (1984 – present) where she is now Professor Emerita. She was the Chair of the Center for Southeast Asian Studies, Berkeley (1999–2001), Visiting Professor at City University of Hong Kong (2001), Visiting Professor at Yonsei University (2011), and a senior researcher at the Asia Research Institute of the National University of Singapore (2010).

Ong was awarded a MacArthur Fellowship for the study of sovereignty and citizenship (2001-2003) and has been awarded grants from the National Science Foundation and the Sloan Foundation for the Social Science Research Council. She received the Cultural Studies Book Award for Flexible Citizenship (1999) from the Association for Asian American Studies as well as a prize from the American Ethnological Society. In addition, she received honorable mention for Buddha is Hiding (2003) from the Society for Urban, National, and Transnational Anthropology.

In 2007, Ong was invited to the World Economic Forum in Davos. She was the Chair of the US National Committee for Pacific Science Association from 2009-2011, and was named Robert H. Lowie Distinguished Chair in Anthropology in 2015. She continues to teach, publish, and lecture internationally.

Throughout her career, she received several fellowships and honors from the MacArthur Foundation, the National Science Foundation, the Sloan Foundation, and the Social Science Research Council.

Her first book, Spirits of Resistance &amp; Capitalist Discipline: Factory Women in Malaysia (1986; second edition 2010) is widely considered a classic in the study of female factory workers in multinational companies. Flexible Citizenship: the Cultural Logics of Transnationality (1999) received an award from the Association of Asian American Studies.

Off-campus, she served on the Science Council of the International Panel on Social Progress, Paris (2014-2017), Executive Program Committee of the American Anthropological Association (2013), and President-elect of the Society for East Asian Anthropology, American Anthropological Association (2009-2011).

== Academic work ==
Aihwa Ong's work deals with particular entanglements of politics, technology and ethics shape particular contexts of globalization. Her angle of inquiry unsettles conventional academic frameworks, suggesting new ways of investigating global phenomena such as capitalism, migration, class, citizenship, cities, and knowledge formation in Asia and the world.

As an anthropologist, Ong employs ethnographic observation and analytical concept-work to investigate diverse subjective and institutional effects of the global on emerging situations for ways of being human today. From the novel freedoms and accompanying restrictions experienced by Malaysian female workers in multinational factories to the accumulative strategies of Asian entrepreneurs in relocating family and capital overseas; from the disciplining of Cambodian refugees towards an embrace of American values to the neoliberal reasoning and graduated modes of governing at work; from the transformation of cities to the rise of contemporary art in Asia; Ong's work tracks the interplay of global forces and everyday practices as they crystallize into myriad and uneven contexts for human living and belonging in modernity.

Her current work focuses on regimes of governing, technology, and culture that shape new meanings and practices of the human in an emerging global region. Her field research shifts between Singapore and China in order to track emerging global hubs for biotechnical experiments with genomic science in contemporary East Asia.

== Work Overview ==
Global Capitalism &amp; Labor

Spirits of Resistance &amp; Capitalist Discipline: Factory Women in Malaysia (1986; second edition 2010)

This is the first book to investigate the impact of multinational factories on female workers in the developing world. Ong studies the wide ranging effects of factory discipline on Muslim factory women in Malaysia, sparking everyday protests, including spirit possession episodes that disrupt production. But factory employment also gains female workers new freedoms in modern consumption and public life. As former peasant girls become industrial workers, they seek upward social mobility, not working-class consciousness.

Asian Diasporas

Ungrounded Empires (1997) is a collection that sparked the revival of Asian diaspora studies in the age of globalization. This collection includes case studies of diverse Asian flows and their varied receptions in Western liberal democracies.

Citizenship

Flexible Citizenship (1999) is an innovative approach that links global flows to changing notions of citizenship. With China’s opening to market capitalism, the Chinese business elite seek economic opportunities and political safety by skillfully navigating the immigration rules of advanced economies. In response to this entrepreneurial influx, liberal citizenship eases rules in order to capture the flight of Pacific rim capital, human skills and knowledge. Global flows instigate the embedding of neoliberal values in citizenship.

Buddha Is Hiding (2003)

This book speaks about the Cambodian refugees in America and their experiences and adventures with American citizenship. It explains how the Cambodian refugees earn their American citizenship by working their way up through society. Ong also concentrates on the activity behind American institutions and how it affects the minority citizens in the society, in terms of health care, law, welfare, etc.

Global Assemblages: Technology, Politics, and Ethics as Anthropological Problems (2005)

This book argues that emerging global milieus are reinforced through the intersecting of global and local systems. Ong argues that different systems that emerge as a result of capitalism, technology, and science that proliferate Asia.

Neoliberalism as Exception: Mutations in Citizenship and Sovereignty (2006)

This book explores the application of uneven neoliberal strategies by Asian states as a mode of thinking and practicing governing for optimal outcomes. In particular, Ong uses the example of the development of free trade zones to attract capital flows, describing it as a method of "graduated sovereignty".

Mutations in Citizenship (2006)

This article shows us how the mutations in citizenship are continuously moving, flowing and changing according to markets, technologies, societies and the population of the society. Ong starts by identifying the elements of citizenship such as citizen’s rights and duties. Citizens' rights are becoming incoherent from each other and being reformed to the criteria of neoliberalism and human rights. She also shows us that the “assemblage” are being taken over by political mobilizations of diverse groups instead of national terrain.

Asian Biotech: Ethics and Communities of Fate (2010)

This book shows us a glimpse of the emerging biosciences landscape in Asia. Ong provided a collection of case studies on biotech topics including genetically modified foods, clinical trials, blood collection, stem cell research etc. These are studies conducted all over Asia in countries such as Singapore, China and India.

Worlding Cities: Asian Experiments with the Art of Being Global (2011)

Worlding Cities (2011) presents studies of emerging cities that challenge Western narratives of “the global city.” Diverse examples from East Asia and the Middle East highlight various aspirations, strategies, and speculations to raise their urban profiles and styles of being distinctive and global.

Fungible Life: Experiment in the Asian City Of Life (2016)

In this book, Ong speaks about the world of bioscience research and explains how Asian biosciences and cosmopolitan sciences go hand in hand and are connected in a tropical climate due the threat of many diseases. She presents examples of biomedical centers in Asia, such as Singapore and China and explains how they map genetic variants, disease risks, biomarkers, etc. Singapore is a diverse country with citizens having an array of many ethnicities, which makes a good example for ethnic stratified databases that represent the populations in Asia. Allowing public access to genomic science in Asia, researchers and scientists will be able to study and discover the relationships between people, objects and spaces, these researches will eventually make a big impact and evolution in the scientific field and put Asia on the map for these discoveries.

== Publications ==
=== Books and edited volumes ===
- Fungible Life: Experiment in the Asian City of Life, Duke University Press, 2016.
- Worlding Cities: Asian Experiments with the Art of Being Global, ed. with Ananya Roy, Wiley-Blackwell, 2011.
- Asian Biotech: Ethics and Communities of Fate, ed. with Nancy N. Chen, Duke University Press, 2010.
- Privatizing China, Socialism from Afar, ed. with Li Zhang, Cornell University Press, 2008.
- Neoliberalism as Exception: Mutations in Citizenship and Sovereignty, Duke University Press, 2006 [Italian, Japanese].
- Global Assemblages: Technology, Politics, and Ethics as Anthropological Problems, ed. with Stephen J. Collier, Blackwell Publishers, 2005.
- Buddha is Hiding: Refugees, Citizenship, the New America, University of California Press, 2003 [Italian].
- Flexible Citizenship: The Cultural Logics of Transnationality, 1999 [German]. Recipient of the Cultural Studies Book Award by the Association of Asian American Studies in 2001.
- Ungrounded Empires: The Cultural Politics of Modern Chinese Transnationalism, ed. with Donald Nonini, Routledge, 1997.
- Bewitching Women, Pious Men: Gender and Labor Politics in Southeast Asia, ed. with Michael Peletz, University of California Press, 1995.
- Spirits of Resistance and Capitalist Discipline: Factory Women in Malaysia, State University of New York Press, 1987 [2010].

=== Selected articles and chapters ===
- "A Questionnaire on Diaspora and the Modern," October, 186: 69–75, 2023.
- "Buoyancy: Blue Territorialization of Chinese Power," in Voluminous States, edited by Franck Bille, Duke University Press, pp. 191–203, 2020.
- "Citizenship: Flexible, Fungible, and Fragile," Citizenship Studies, DOI: 10.1080/13621025.2022.2091244, 2022
- "Why Singapore Trumps Iceland: Gathering Genes in the Wild," Journal of Cultural Economy, vol. 8, no. 3, 2015.
- "A Milieu of Mutations: The Pluripotency and Fungibility of Life in Asia," East Asian Science, Technology and Society, 7, (2013).
- "What Marco Polo Forgot: Asian Art Negotiates the Global," Current Anthropology, vol. 53, no. 4 (2012).
- "Hyperbuilding: Spectacle, Speculation, and the Hyperspace of Sovereignty," in Worlding Cities eds. Ananya Roy and Aihwa Ong, Wiley-Blackwell, 2011.
- "The Human and Ethical Living," in Globalizing the Research Imagination, Jane Kenway and Johannah Fahey eds. pp. 87–100. London: Routledge (2008).
- "Neoliberalism as a Mobile Technology," Transactions of the Institute of British Geographers, vol. 32, no. 3 (2007).
- "Please Stay: Pied-a-Terre Subjects in the Megacity," Citizenship Studies, vol. 11, no. 1 (2007).
- "Mutations in Citizenship," Theory, Culture, and Society, vol. 22, no. 3, (2006).
- "Experiments with Freedom: Milieus of the Human," American Literary History , vol. 8, no. 2 (2006).
- "(Re)Articulations of Citizenship," Political Science and Politics, vol. 38, no. 4 (2005).
- "The Chinese Axis: Zoning Technologies and Variegated Sovereignty," Journal of East Asian Studies, vol. 4, no. 1 (2004).
- "Cyberpublics and Diaspora Politics among Transnational Chinese," Interventions, vol. 5, no. 1 (2003).
- "A Higher Learning: Educational Availability and Flexible Citizenship in Global Space," in Diversity and Citizenship Education, ed. James Banks, Wiley, 2003.
- "Graduated Sovereignty in Southeast Asia," Theory, Culture, and Society, vol. 17, no. 4 (2000).
- "Muslim Feminists in the Shelter of Corporate Islam," Citizenship Studies, vol. 3, no. 3 (1999).
- "Strategic Sisterhood or Sisters in Solidarity? Questions of Communitarianism and Citizenship in Asia," Indiana Journal of Global Legal Studies, vol. 4, no. 1 (1996).
- "Cultural Citizenship as Subject-Making: New Immigrants Negotiate Racial and Ethnic Boundaries," Current Anthropology, vol. 37, no. 5 (1996).
- "On the Edge of Empires: Flexible Citizenship among Chinese in Diaspora," Positions, vol. 1, no. 3 (1995).
- "The Gender and Labor Politics of Postmodernity," Annual Review of Anthropology, vol. 20 (1991).
- "State versus Islam: Malay Families, Women's Bodies, and the Body Politic in Malaysia," American Ethnologist, vol. 17, no. 2 (1991).
- "The Production of Possession: Spirits and Multinational Corporation in Malaysia," American Ethnologist, vol. 15, no. 1 (1988).
