= Charlotte Gower Chapman =

American ethnologist

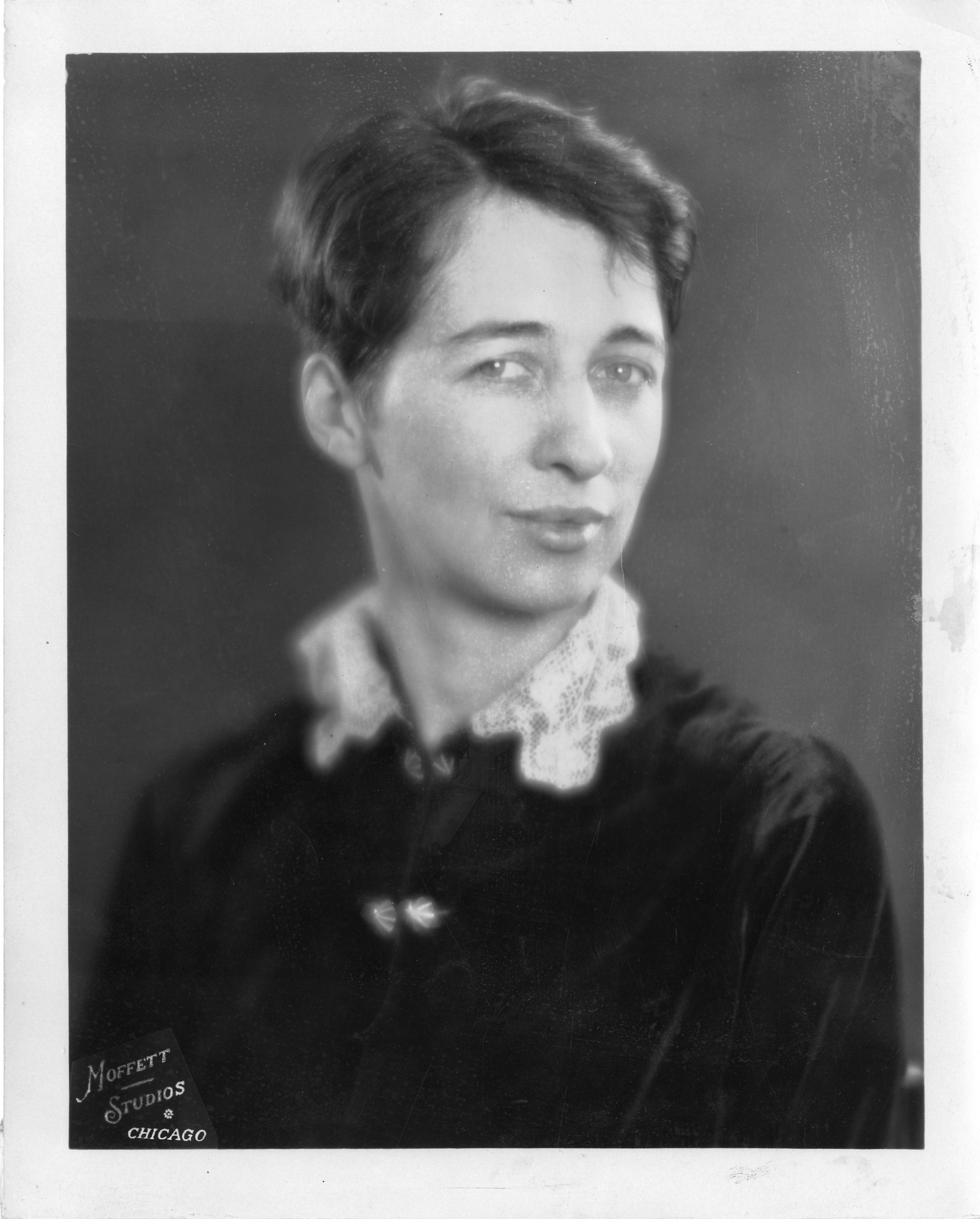
- Born: Charlotte Day Gower; 1902; Kankakee, Illinois, US
- Died: 1982 (aged 79–80)
- Spouse: Savilion H. Chapman

Charlotte Gower Chapman, born Charlotte Day Gower, was an ethnologist and an author. In 1928, she received a PhD in Anthropology from the University of Chicago. Later on while working at Lingnan University in China during World War II she was taken prisoner by the Japanese when the US entered the war, but was released by 1942. After, she joined the United States Marine Corps and worked in the Office of Strategic Services until 1947 when she became an employee of the Central Intelligence Agency until her retirement in 1964.

Chapman wrote an anthropological study titled Milocca: A Sicilian Village, which included a detailed account of daily life, traditions and even mysticism that would have been familiar to earlier generations of Sicilians but was about to be inexorably changed by the events of the twentieth century.

== Education ==
Gower enrolled in the Department of Sociology and Anthropology at the University of Chicago in 1924. Gower's M.A. and PhD research was heavily influenced by both Franz Boas' four-fields anthropology and Chicago School sociology. She served as a member of Fay-Cooper Cole's field survey work studying Illinois' prehistory for two years beginning in 1926, and presented on the work of the archaeological field party at the Central Section of the American Anthropological Association's Chicago meeting in 1927. Gower was awarded her master's degree in 1926 for her historical ethnology thesis on aboriginal West Indian cultures titled, "The Northern and Southern Affiliations of Antillean Culture." She conducted her PhD dissertation research among Chicago's Sicilian immigrant community, focusing initially on Sicilian religion and culture during that city's Prohibition era. However, Gower then departed for 18 months of field research, supported by a Social Science Research Council fellowship, in the remote Sicilian mountain village of Milocca, where she became fluent in both the local Sicilian dialect and standard Italian, and pursued her research goals despite the challenges of working as a woman in the field in early 20th century Italy. She received her PhD in 1928, and was one of only two women awarded that degree from the University of Chicago's Department of Sociology and Anthropology during her four years of study at that institution.

== Work ==
In Milocca, Gower not only describes the traditional aspects of the community in which she immersed herself, but also recorded and relayed the political tensions of the time between socialists and fascists, and described a 1920 uprising where local laborers took possession of six large estates. She also described the rise of the fascists to power throughout Italy at the time, and the role of the Sicilian Mafia in village life, with Milocca the site of a mass arrest of suspected mafiosi in January 1928. Gower's Milocca is considered a comprehensive community study focusing on social stratification, while also serving as an account of Sicilian kinship, religious beliefs and practices, including the annual processions of saints or festas, and remains one of the only accounts of Sicilian village life from the pre-war period, and is cited extensively in John Davis's People of the Mediterranean (1977). Charlotte Gower joined the faculty of the University of Wisconsin in 1930 as an assistant professor, but left in 1938 to take a teaching position at Ling-Nan University in China.
