= Eugene S. Hunn =

American anthropologist

Eugene S. Hunn (born 1943) is a professor emeritus in anthropology at the University of Washington. His research interests include ethnobiology, ethnoecology, and cognitive anthropology.

Hunn obtained his bachelor's degree in sociology from Stanford University in 1964. He went on to receive a PhD in anthropology from the University of California, Berkeley, in 1973. He began teaching in the department of anthropology at the University of Washington in 1972. Hunn has conducted fieldwork in indigenous communities throughout North America.

Hunn became a Fellow of the American Association for the Advancement of Science in 1983. Hunn has served as host of the annual conference of the Society of Ethnobiology. He has also served as editor of the Journal of Ethnobiology and president of the Society of Ethnobiology. In 2014, Hunn was awarded the Distinguished Ethnobiologist Award from the Society of Ethnobiology.

== Selected publications ==
- Williams, N. M., & Hunn, E. S. (2019). Resource managers: North American and Australian hunter-gatherers. Routledge.
- Hunn, E. S. (2008). A Zapotec Natural History: Trees, Herbs, and Flowers, Birds, Beasts, and Bugs in the Life of San Juan Gbëë. University of Arizona Press.
- Hunn, E. S., & Selam, J. (1990). Nch'i-wana," the big river": Mid-Columbia Indians and their land. University of Washington Press.
- Hunn, E. S. (1977). Tzeltal Folk Zoology: The Classification of Discontinuities in Nature.
