= Odette Mennesson-Rigaud =

French and Haitian ethnographer (1907–1990)

Odette Mennesson-Rigaud (1907–1990) was a French and Haitian ethnographer and photographer. She is most known for her research into the African diasporic religion of Haitian vodou.

== Biography ==
Mennesson-Rigaud was born in 1907 in France. She married Haitian Milo Rigaud on 10 January 1935 in New York City, United States. She became a Haitian citizen after her marriage.

Mennesson-Rigaud was a self-taught ethnographer. She worked as a field guide to foreign scholars who travelled to Port-au-Prince to study Haitian culture and the African diasporic religion of Haitian vodou, introducing them to vodou ritual specialists in an intermediary role. Mennesson-Rigaud supported the research of Erika Bourguignon, Maya Deren, Michel Leiris, and Alfred Métraux; Métraux dedicated his book Voodoo in Haiti (1959) to her. American anthropologist Harold Courlander, who studied in Haiti, described Mennesson-Rigaud as "the ultimate insider, the outstanding non-Haitian. She knew everybody. She was the best informed of all researchers and scholars."

In 1958, Mennesson-Rigaud published Le role de Vandou dans l'indépendence d'Haiti in the journal Présence Africaine, which explored the role of vodou in the Haitian Revolution and recounted the origin story of "Lakou Soukri". She theorised that marronage provided Africans who escaped enslavement the freedom to develop their own religion.

Mennesson-Rigaud also wrote about the Haitian twin cult and Marassa Jumeaux (the divine twins in Vodou), describing them as "the divine principle of life." She described how twins were "semi-divinised" and recounted stories of the parents of twins trying to escape the children's power and wrath. Details in Mennesoson-Rigaud's manuscript notes recorded that leafy vegetables were never given to twins, as they were thought to diminish their powers.

As a photographer, Mennesson-Rigaud's photographs and drawings accompanied her husband's book Secrets of Voodoo (1969). She also contributed images to the French periodical Haïti, Poètes Noirs (1951) and photographed a pilgrimage to the Saut d'Eau Falls.

== Archive and legacy ==
Mennesson-Rigaud collected reptile and insect familiars or totems.

Mennesson-Rigaud's archive, covering almost fifty years of work, was entrusted to the Bibliothèque Haïtienne des Pères du Saint-Esprit, which was destroyed by an earthquake on 12 January 2010. The archive of 488 documents has since been recovered. UNESCO recognised the global significance of this archive in 2017 by adding it to the Memory of the World International Register.

In 2019, sound recordings covering religious expression in Haiti by Mennasson-Rigaud made in the early 1980s were donated to the collection of the American Folklife Center in Washington, D.C, United States.

A mural of Mennesson-Rigaud was painted at the National Office of Ethnology in Port-au-Prince.
