= Carl-Herman Tillhagen =

Swedish folklorist and ethnologist

- Born: 17 December 1906; Sundsvall, Sweden
- Died: 28 May 2002 (aged 95)

Academic background
- Education: Uppsala University; Stockholm University

Academic work
- Discipline: folklore studies ethnology
- Main interests: Scandinavian folklore

Carl-Herman Tillhagen (17 December 1906 – 28 May 2002) was a Swedish folklorist and ethnologist who did extensive research on Scandinavian folklore.

== Life ==
He was born on 17 December 1906 in Sundsvall, Sweden. From 1932 to 1936 Tillhagen studied at Uppsala University. He continued his studies at Stockholm University until 1943, and until 1960 in Oslo where he received his doctorate. In 1939 he was employed by Nordiska museet, where he was a curator from 1961 to 1972.

In 1954 he was employed for a study of the Romani people. He was on the board of directors in the International Society for Folk Narrative Research. In 1966 he was guest professor at Indiana University and University of California.

== Bibliography ==
- Taikon berättar (1946)
- Svenska folklekar och danser I-II (1949–50, med N. Denker)
- Folklig läkekonst (1960)
- Folklig spådomskonst (1961)
- Papers on Folk-Medicine (1964)
- Zigenarna i Sverige (1965)
- Glada juledagar (1965)
- Fåglarna i folktron (1978)
- Folklig ordakonst (1980)
- Järnet och människorna, verklighet och vidskepelse (1981)
- Vardagsskrock (1982)
- Barnet i folktron (1983)
- Jaktskrock (1985)
- Arbetsliv och julglädje (1985)
- Drömrosor och kärleksört (1985)
- Bellmanhistorier (1986)
- Vävskrock (1986)
- Allmogejakt i Sverige (1987)
- Malmsägner och gruvskrock (1988)
- Vår kropp i folktron (1989)
- Himlens stjärnor och vädrets makter (1991)
- Skogarna och träden (1995)
- Vattnens folklore (1997)
- Bergen de blå och stenarna där barn du lekte (1998)
- Våra folkminnen (1999)
