= Sharlotte Neely =

American anthropologist (born 1948)

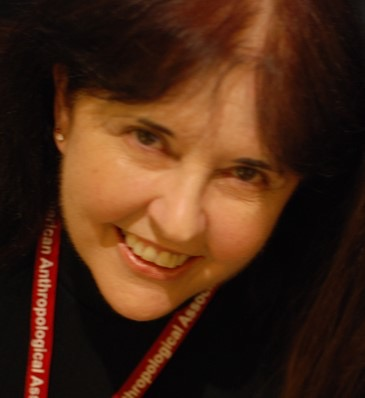
- Sharlotte Neely, Anthropologist
- Born: Sharlotte Kathleen Neely; August 13, 1948 (age 78); Savannah, Georgia, U.S.
- Other name: Sharlotte Neely Donnelly

Academic background
- Education: University of North Carolina at Chapel Hill
- Thesis: Ethnicity in a Native American Community (1976)
- Doctoral advisor: John J. Honigmann

Academic work
- Institutions: Northern Kentucky University

Sharlotte Kathleen Neely is an American anthropologist who is known for her research on Native North Americans, especially the Cherokee Indians. As of 2017, she was Professor Emerita of Anthropology at Northern Kentucky University. In 2025 the Eastern Band of Cherokee Indians Tribal Council awarded her the title Honorary Cherokee.

== Early life and education ==
Sharlotte Kathleen Neely was born in Savannah, Georgia on Friday the 13th of August 1948 the only child of Joseph Bowden Neely and Kathleen Bell Neely. Her father nicknamed her “Sharkey.” The family lived in Savannah until 1962 when they moved to the Atlanta area. Neely is a graduate (1966) of Druid Hills High School in Atlanta.

She earned her B.A. degree in anthropology from Georgia State University in 1970 and her M.A. (1971) and Ph.D. (1976) degrees in anthropology from the University of North Carolina at Chapel Hill. At UNC-CH Neely was a student of anthropologist John J. Honigmann. She joined the faculty at Northern Kentucky University in 1974 and retired in 2017 as professor emerita. At NKU Neely served as both Anthropology Coordinator and Native American Studies Director.

She was President of Anthropologists and Sociologists of Kentucky from 1979 until 1980.

== Career ==
Neely's topics of study include ethnicity, indigenousness, gender roles, social organization, the origins of human behavior and institutions, and ethnohistory. Neely’s very first publication was in the American Anthropologist while still a first-year graduate student. Her most recent is the book, Global Indigenous Cultures: Their Struggles for Survival, co-edited with Douglas W. Hume.

Neely started investigating Snowbird Cherokees in the 1970s and published her book Snowbird Cherokees: People of Persistence in 1991. The book is an ethnographic study of Snowbird, North Carolina, a remote mountain community of Cherokees who are regarded as simultaneously the most traditional and the most adaptive members of the entire tribe. The book led to a documentary film of the same name, which won multiple awards. In 2021 Neely was honored with a 30th anniversary edition of her book. The foreword of that edition was written by Trey Adcock (Cherokee Nation, Oklahoma) and Gill Jackson (Eastern Band of Cherokee Indians, North Carolina).

Anthropologist Sharlotte Neely (far left) does fieldwork among North Carolina Cherokees in the 1970s.

She has also written a science fiction book, Kasker, under the name Sharlotte Donnelly.

== Selected publications ==
- Neely Williams, Sharlotte (1971). "The Limitations of the Male/Female Activity Distinction among Primates: An Extension of Judith K. Brown's "A Note on the Division of Labor by Sex"". American Anthropologist. 73 (3): 805–806. doi:10.1525/aa.1971.73.3.02a00240. ISSN 0002-7294.
- Neely, Sharlotte (1975). "The Quaker Era of Cherokee Indian Education, 1880-1892". Appalachian Journal. 2 (4): 314–322. ISSN 0090-3779. JSTOR 40932066.
- Neely, Sharlotte (2021). Snowbird Cherokees : people of persistence. ISBN 978-0-8203-6092-8. OCLC 1308672109.
- Neely, Sharlotte (2017). Native nations : the survival of fourth world peoples. JCharlton Publishing Limited. ISBN 978-1-926476-17-9. OCLC 974489802.
- Neely, Sharlotte (2011). "Wolves and Monogamy: A Comment on Shipman". Current Anthropology. 52 (3): 435. doi:10.1086/659843. S2CID 142484851.

== Honors and awards ==
In 1976 the American Association of University Women recognized her for her potential for achievement. While at Northern Kentucky University, she was named Outstanding Professor in 1994, recognized by the alumni association in 1996 with the Strongest Influence Award, and by the student body in 1998 with the Dr. Martin Luther King, Jr. Service Award.
