= Philippe Descola =

French anthropologist (born 1949)

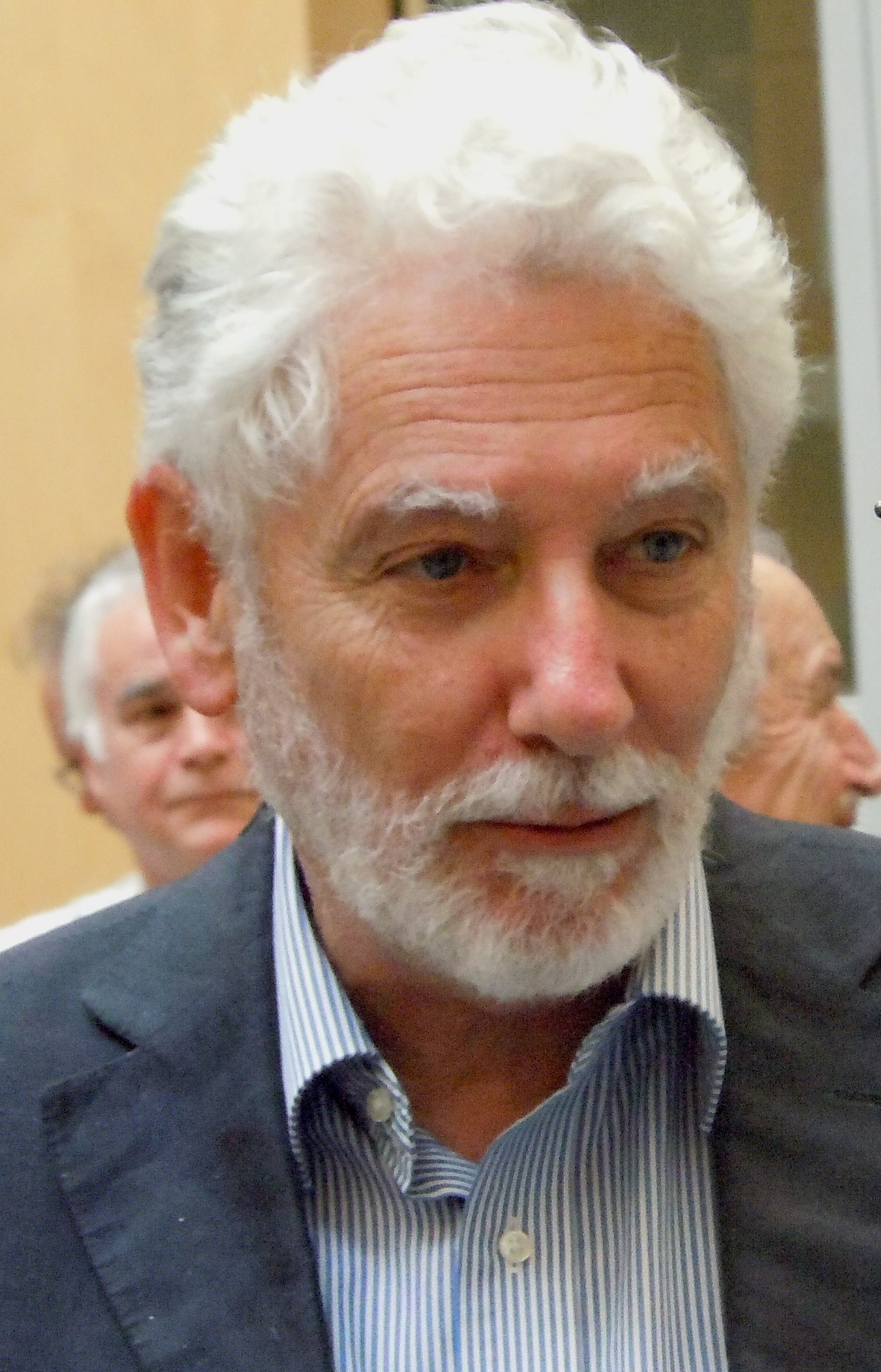
- Born: 19 June 1949 (age 77); France

Philosophical work
- Era: Contemporary philosophy/Social anthropology/Ethnology/Social science
- Region: French philosophy
- School: Structuralism
- Main interests: Anthropology, Epistemology, Ethnology, Ontology
- Notable ideas: The four ontologies (animism, totemism, analogism, naturalism)

Philippe Descola, FBA (French: [fi.lip de.skɔ.la]; born 19 June 1949) is a French anthropologist noted for studies of the Achuar, one of several Jivaroan peoples, and for his contributions to anthropological theory.

== Background ==
Descola first graduated in philosophy at the École normale supérieure de Lyon and later turned to anthropology, and became a student of Claude Lévi-Strauss (who had followed the same academic path).

His ethnographic studies in the Amazon region of Ecuador began in 1976 and were funded by CNRS. He lived with the Achuar from 1976 to 1978. His reputation largely arises from these studies.

== Academic career ==
As a professor, he has been invited several times to the Universities of São Paulo, Beijing, Chicago, Montreal, London School of Economics, Cambridge, St. Petersburg, Buenos Aires, Gothenburg, Uppsala and Leuven. He has given lectures in over forty universities and academic institutions abroad, including the Beatrice Blackwood Lecture at Oxford, the George Lurcy Lecture at Chicago, the Munro Lecture at Edinburgh, the Radcliffe-Brown Lecture at the British Academy, the Clifford Geertz Memorial Lecture at Princeton, the Jensen Lecture at Frankfurt and the Victor Goldschmidt Lecture at Heidelberg. He has chaired the Société des Américanistes since 2002 and the scientific committee of the Fondation Fyssen from 2001 to 2009, as well as holding memberships in many other scientific committees. He has also been elected Honorary fellow of the Royal Anthropological Institute and received in 2015 the honoris causa doctorate from the University of Montreal, Canada. From 2000 to 2019, he was chair of anthropology at the Collège de France.

== Published works ==
From his 2005 book Beyond Nature and Culture he has turned towards a more theoretical anthropology, reviving his philosophical studies to propose a new anthropological epistemology, influenced by the sociological work of his friend Bruno Latour. This new and controversial trend has been dubbed the "narrow ontological turn", and has been the subject of a fashion effect between 2014 and 2017, particularly in France.

In his book Spears of Twilight: Life and Death in the Amazon Jungle, Descola documents and explains the culture of the Achuar in terms of cosmology and metaphysics. He "parses out the subtleties of Achuar cosmology and metaphysics but also treats the mores and manners of everyday life -- like the etiquette of drinking manioc beer when visiting -- with empathy and a keen eye." With attention to the minutest detail, the book focuses on one of hundreds of distinct Indigenous societies in the Amazon, the biological diversity of the tropical forest where they live, and the interdependence between the Achuar society and its natural environment, thus stressing the critical point that what happens to one aspect affects the whole. Moreover, this book aligns with a key insight from his overarching theory, emphasized in later works, in particular Beyond Nature and Culture, that challenges Western notions of neutrality between culture and nature.

== Personal life ==
His wife, Anne-Christine Taylor, is an ethnologist, specialist of Amazonian peoples.

== Distinctions ==
- 1996: CNRS Silver medal
- 1997: Knight of the French Order of Academic Palms
- 2004: French National Order of Merit
- 2006: Foreign Honorary Members of the American Academy of Arts and Sciences
- 2010: Elected as corresponding fellow of the British Academy
- 2010: Officer in the French Legion of Honor
- 2011: Édouard Bonnefous Prize from Academy of Moral and Political Sciences
- 2012: CNRS Gold Medal
- 2014: International Cosmos Prize
- 2016: Commander in the French Legion of Honor
- 2022: Winner of the Principality Prize in Monaco, presented for lifetime achievements and entire body of work by Les Rencontres Philosophiques de Monaco & the Prince Pierre Foundation.

== English-translated bibliography (partial) ==
- Descola, Philippe (1994). In the society of nature: a native ecology in Amazonia. Cambridge Studies in Social and Cultural Anthropology 93. Nora Scott (trans.). Cambridge; New York: Cambridge University Press. ISBN 9780521574679. OCLC 27974392.
- Descola, Philippe (1996). The spears of twilight: life and death in the Amazon jungle. Janet Lloyd (trans.). New York: New Press. ISBN 9781565844384. OCLC 34471521.
- Philippe Descola (2010). "Cognition, Perception and Worlding". Interdisciplinary Science Reviews. 35 (3–4): 334–340. doi:10.1179/030801810x12772143410287. Wikidata Q113836660.
- Descola, Philippe (2013). Beyond Nature and Culture. Janet Lloyd (trans.). Chicago: University of Chicago Press. ISBN 9780226145006. OCLC 809911095.
- Descola, Philippe (2023). The Composition of Worlds: Interviews with Pierre Charbonnier. Pierre Charbonnier. Polity Press. ISBN 9781509555499.
- Descola, Philippe (2025). Forms of the Visible: An Anthropology of Figuration. Catherine Porter. Polity Press. ISBN 9781509561971.

=== Titles in French ===
- Les Formes du visible, Paris:Seuil, 2021, ISBN 978-2-02-147698-9
- Par-delà nature et culture, Paris:Gallimard, 2005, ISBN 9782070772636
- Le Sport est-il un jeu ?, Paris:Robert Laffont, 2022, ISBN 9782221264454
- Cultures, Paris:PUF, 2017, ISBN 9782355362675
- Étre au monde, Presses universitaires de Lyon, 2014, ISBN 9782729708870
- La composition des mondes, ISBN 9782081395947
- Les Grandes Civilisations, ISBN 9782227483118
