= Eduardo Viveiros de Castro =

Brazilian anthropologist (born 1951)

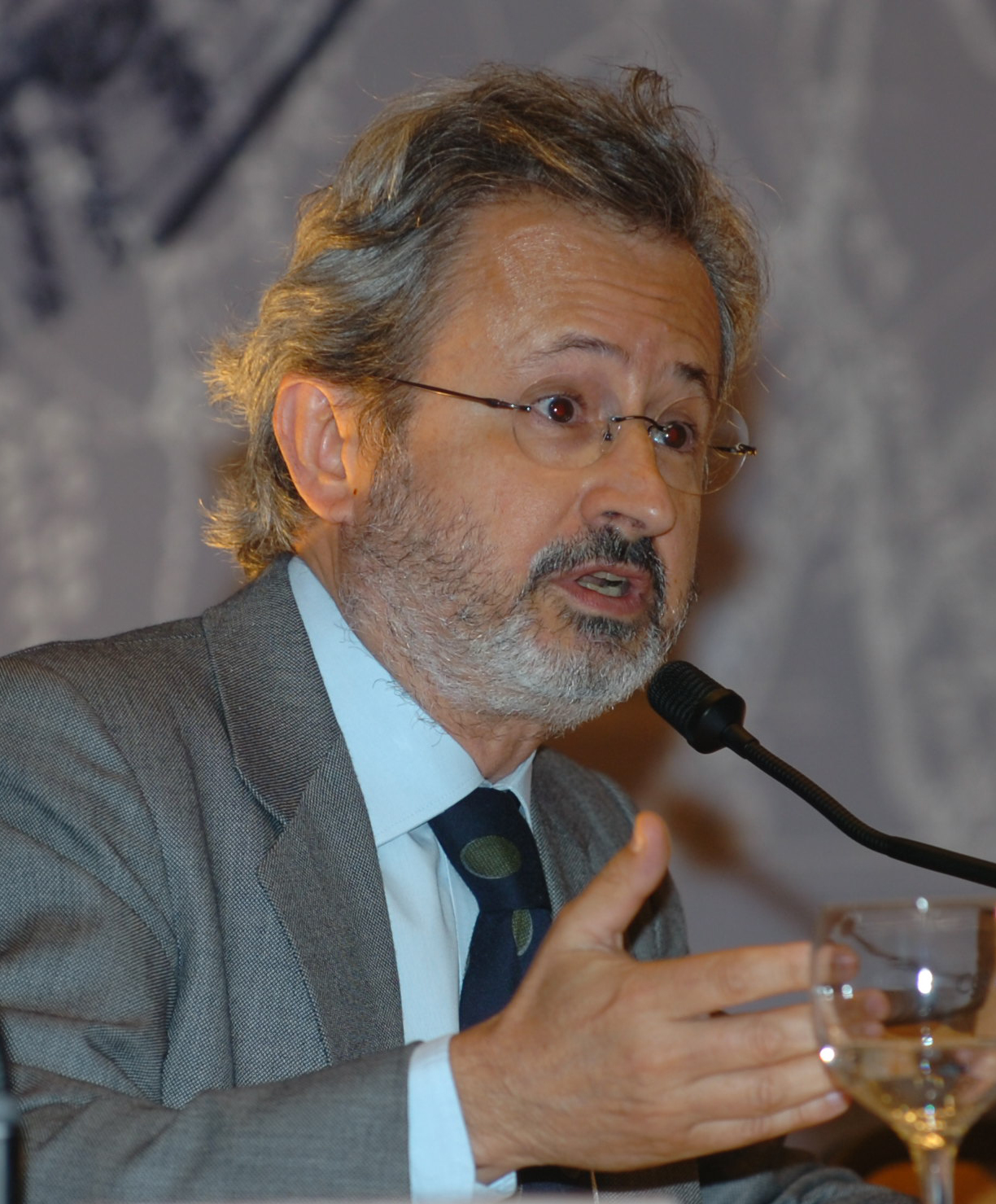
Eduardo Viveiros de Castro at Brasília in 2007

Eduardo Batalha Viveiros de Castro (born 1951) is a Brazilian anthropologist and a professor at the National Museum of the Federal University of Rio de Janeiro.

He has published many books and articles which are considered important in anthropology and in Americanist ethnology, among them: Cannibal Metaphysics, From the enemy's point of view: humanity and divinity in an Amazonian society, Amazônia: etnologia e história indígena ("The Amazon: Ethnology and Indigenous History" - coeditor with Manuela Carneiro da Cunha), and A inconstância da alma selvagem e outros ensaios de antropologia ("The Inconstancy of the Indian Soul and other essays on Anthropology").

Born in Rio de Janeiro, Viveiros de Castro taught at the École des Hautes Études en Sciences Sociales, the University of Chicago, and at the University of Cambridge. Among his principal contributions is the understanding of Amerindian perspectivism. His works are among the key influences for the emergence of the ontological turn in anthropology.

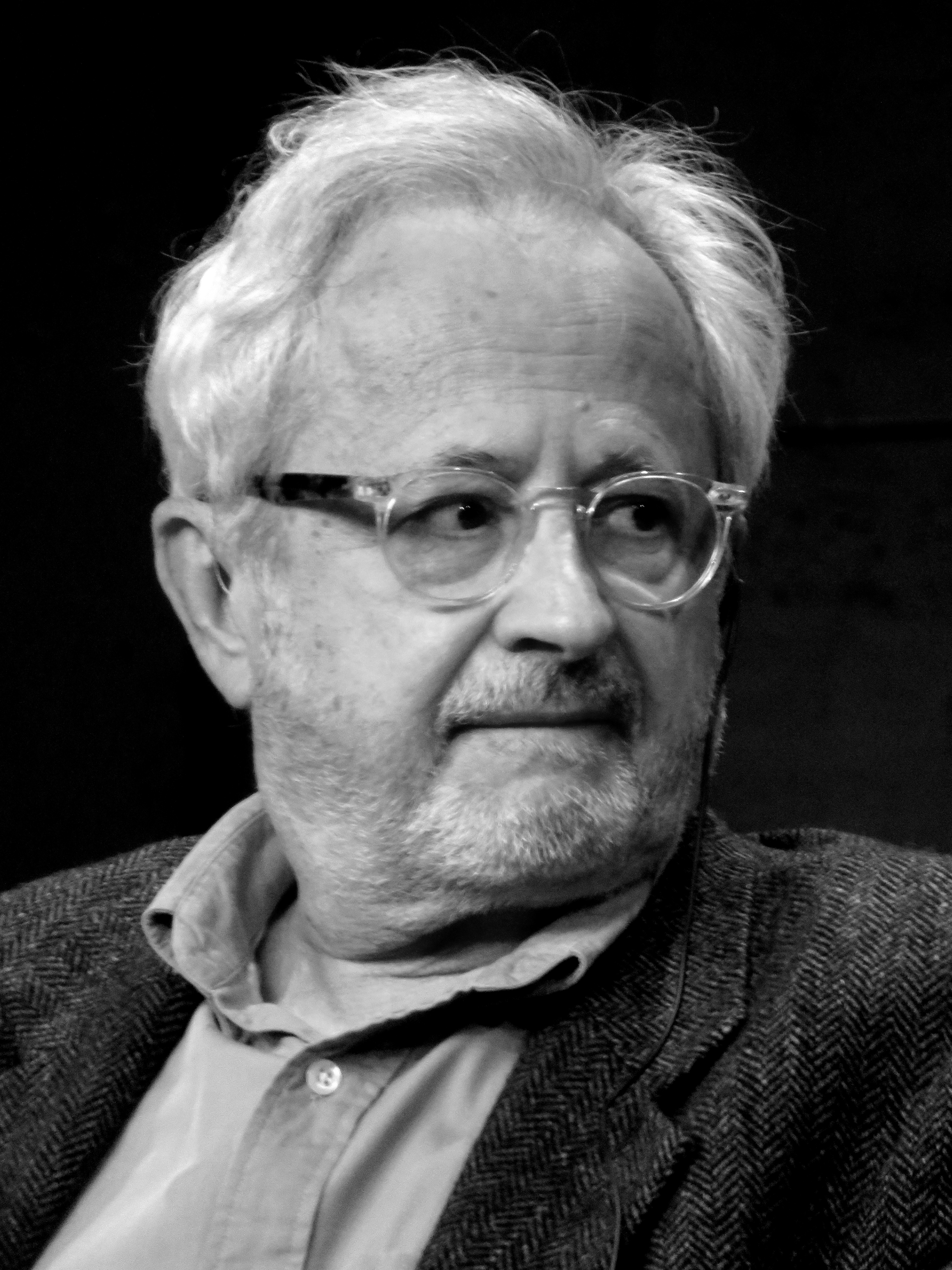
Eduardo Viveiros de Castro_Barcelona_ 2025 [CCCB]

== Publications in English ==
- From the Enemy's Point of View: Humanity and Divinity in an Amazonian Society, The University of Chicago Press (1992)
- Cosmological Deixis and Amerindian Perspectivism in The Journal of the Royal Anthropological Institute, Vol. 4 (3), (1998)
- Exchanging Perspectives: The Transformation of Objects into Subjects in Amerindian Ontologies in Common Knowledge, vol. 1 (3), (2004)
- Perspectival Anthropology and the Method of Controlled Equivocation in Tipití: Journal of the Society for the Anthropology of Lowland South America, vol 2 (1) (2004)
- The Inconstancy of the Indian Soul: The Encounter of Catholics and Cannibals in Sixteenth-century Brazil, Prickly Paradigm Press (2011)
- Cosmological Perspectivism in Amazonia and Elsewhere, Hau Masterclass Series (vol. 1) (2012)
- Radical Dualism, Hatje Cantz (2012)
- Cannibal Metaphysics, Univocal Publishing (2014)
- The Relative Native: Essays on Indigenous Conceptual Worlds, Hau - Special Collections in Ethnographic Theory (2015)
- The Ends of the World, with Déborah Danowski, Polity (2017)
