= Risk and Blame =

Book by Mary Douglas

- Author: Mary Douglas
- Original title: Risk and Blame: Essays in Cultural Theory
- Subject: Cultural anthropology, Cultural theory of risk
- Publisher: Routledge
- Publication date: 1992
- ISBN: 0-415-06280-2
- Preceded by: How Institutions Think
- Followed by: In the Wilderness

Risk and Blame: Essays in Cultural Theory (first published 1992) is a collection of essays by the influential British cultural anthropologist Mary Douglas.

== Contents ==
The collection contains sixteen lectures and essays, grouped in three parts: "Risk and blame" (six pieces) on the cultural theory of risk; "Wants and institutions" (five pieces) applying cultural theory to issues other than risk; and "Believing and thinking" (five pieces) on the cultural determinants of individual production of and response to ideas.

The final piece in the volume, "The Hotel Kwilu: A Model of Models", recounts a return to Lele territory four decades after first undertaking fieldwork there. It was originally delivered in 1988 as the Distinguished Lecture at the 87th annual meeting of the American Anthropological Association.

== Editions ==
After hardback publication in 1992, the collection was brought out in paperback in 1994, and reissued in 1996. In 2003 it was published as volume 12 in Mary Douglas: Collected Works (ISBN 0415291151)

== Reviews ==
- Zygmunt Bauman in British Journal of Sociology, 45:1 (1994), pp. 143–144.
- Robert Paine in Current Anthropology, 37:4 (1996), pp. 721–722.
- T. O. Beidelman in American Anthropologist, New Series, 95:4 (1993), pp. 1065–1066.
- Elaine Draper in Contemporary Sociology, 22:5 (1993), pp. 641–644.

== Sources ==
- Richard Fardon, Mary Douglas: An Intellectual Biography (London: Routledge, 1999).
