= Implicit Meanings =

Book by Mary Douglas

- First edition
- Author: Mary Douglas
- Original title: Implicit Meanings: Essays in Anthropology
- Language: English
- Subject: Cultural anthropology
- Genre: Non-fiction
- Publisher: Routledge & Kegan Paul Ltd
- Publication date: 1975 (1991, 1999, 2001, 2003)
- Publication place: United Kingdom
- Media type: Print
- Pages: xxi, 325 p.
- ISBN: 0-415-29108-9
- Preceded by: Rules and Meanings (1973)
- Followed by: The World of Goods (1979)

Implicit Meanings: Essays in Anthropology is a collection of essays written in the 1950s, 1960s and 1970s by the influential social anthropologist and cultural theorist Mary Douglas.

== Publication history ==
The volume Implicit Meanings was first published by Routledge in 1975 and was reprinted in 1978 and 1991. It went into a second edition in 1999, with revisions and additional material (including a new preface), which was reprinted in 2001, and again in 2003 as volume 5 of Mary Douglas: Collected Works (ISBN 0415291089). The essays printed had originally appeared in journals, such as Man or Daedalus, or as contributions to scholarly collections.

== Contents ==
In the second edition, the volume contains 21 essays divided into three sections: "Essays on the Implicit", comprising essays from the 1950s, primarily about specific aspects of Lele culture and ending with "Looking Back on the 1950s essays"; "Critical Essays", comprising essays from the 1960s, often commenting directly on the work of other anthropologists, such as Godfrey Lienhardt, and ending with "Looking Back on the 1960s essays"; and "Essays on the a priori", comprising essays from the 1970s, discussing risk, food, and the broader issues of categorization that were becoming one of Douglas's main intellectual concerns, and ending with "Looking Back on the 1970s essays".

The essay "Jokes" was reprinted in Rethinking Popular Culture: Contemporary Perspectives in Cultural Studies, edited by Chandra Mukerji and Michael Schudson (1991), pp. 291–310.

== Reviewers ==
- Rodney Needham in Man, New Series, 11:1 (1976), pp. 127–128.
- David Silverman, Edward A. Tiryakian, Nanette J. Davis and Barry Schwartz in The Sociological Quarterly, 19:2 (1978), pp. 355–368.
- Barry Barnes and Steven Shapin, “Where Is the Edge of Objectivity?”, in The British Journal for the History of Science, 10:1 (1977), pp. 61–66.
- Bennetta Jules-Rosette in Contemporary Sociology, Vol. 6, No. 5 (1977), pp. 554–555.
- Renato Rosaldo in The American Journal of Sociology, Vol. 82, No. 5 (Mar., 1977), pp. 1152–1156.
