= Purity Laws =

Purity Laws may refer to:

- Reinheitsgebot, laws regulating beer manufacturing in Germany
- Sacred contagion, the belief that spiritual properties may be passed through interaction
- ṭumah and ṭaharah, purity in Jewish tradition
