= Purity and Danger =

1966 anthropology book by Mary Douglas

Purity and Danger: An Analysis of Concepts of Pollution and Taboo
- Cover of the first edition
- Author: Mary Douglas
- Language: English
- Subject: Social anthropology
- Publisher: Routledge and Kegan Paul
- Publication date: 1966
- Publication place: United Kingdom
- Media type: Print
- Pages: 196 pp.
- ISBN: 0-7100-1299-3
- OCLC: 50333732
- Preceded by: The Lele of the Kasai
- Followed by: Natural Symbols

Purity and Danger: An Analysis of Concepts of Pollution and Taboo is a 1966 book by the anthropologist and cultural theorist Mary Douglas. It is her best known work. In 1991 the Times Literary Supplement listed it as one of the hundred most influential non-fiction books published since 1945.

== Summary ==
The line of inquiry in Purity and Danger traces the words and meaning of dirt in different contexts. What is regarded as dirt in a given society is any matter considered out of place. (Douglas took that lead from William James.) She attempted to clarify the differences between the sacred, the clean and the unclean in different societies and times, but that did not entail judging religions as pessimistic or optimistic in their understanding of purity or dirt, such as dirt-affirming or otherwise. Through a complex and sophisticated reading of ritual, religion and lifestyle, Douglas challenged Western ideas of pollution and clarified how context and social history are essential.

As an example of that approach, Douglas first proposed that the kosher laws were not, as many believed, either primitive health regulations or randomly chosen tests of the Israelites' commitment to God. Instead, Douglas argued that the laws were about symbolic boundary-maintenance. Prohibited foods were those that did not seem to fall neatly into any category. For example, the place of pigs in the natural order was ambiguous because they shared the cloven hoof of the ungulates but did not chew cud.

Later, in a 2002 preface to Purity and Danger, Douglas went on to retract this explanation of the kosher rules and said that it had been "a major mistake". Instead, she proposed that "the dietary laws intricately model the body and the altar upon one another". For instance, among land animals, Israelites were allowed to eat animals only if they were allowed to be sacrificed as well: animals that depend on herdsmen. Douglas concluded from that that animals that are abominable to eat are not in fact impure but that "it is abominable to harm them". She claimed that later interpreters (even later Biblical authors) had misunderstood this.

== Influence ==
A historian of Late Antiquity, Peter Brown, stated that Purity and Danger was a major influence in his important 1971 article "The Rise and Function of the Holy Man in Late Antiquity", which is considered to be one of the bases for all subsequent study of early Christian asceticism.

In Powers of Horror (1980), Julia Kristeva elaborates her theory of abjection and recognises the influence of Douglas's "fundamental work" but criticises certain aspects of her approach. More recently, the book was the subject of Ansgar Allen’s novel Midden Hill (2025), in which its core ideas are discussed.

== Publication history ==
- — (1966). Purity and danger: An analysis of the concepts of pollution and taboo (1st ed.). Routledge & Kegan Paul. LCCN 66073266. OCLC 4881280.
- — (1966). Purity and danger: An analysis of concepts of pollution and taboo. New York City: Frederick A. Praeger, Inc. LCCN 66023887. OCLC 1617121.
- — (1984). Purity and danger: An analysis of the concepts of pollution and taboo. London: Ark Paperbacks. ISBN 978-0-7448-0011-1. OCLC 12451903.
- — (1996). Purity and danger: An analysis of concepts of pollution and taboo. Mary Douglas: Collected Works. Vol. 2. London: Routledge. ISBN 978-0-415-06608-2. OCLC 39189620.
- — (2002-09-12). Purity and danger: An analysis of concept of pollution and taboo. Routledge Classics. Routledge. ISBN 978-0-415-28995-5. (with new preface by Mary Douglas)
- — (2003). Purity and danger: An analysis of concept of pollution and taboo. Routledge Classics. Routledge. doi:10.4324/9780203361832. ISBN 978-0-203-36183-2. OCLC 7390553996. Excerpt
- — (2003). Purity and danger: An analysis of concepts of pollution and taboo. Mary Douglas: Collected Works. Vol. 2. Routledge. ISBN 978-0-415-29105-7. OCLC 54401333. Excerpt
- — (2013-06-17). Purity and danger: An analysis of concepts of pollution and taboo (ebook). Mary Douglas: Collected Works. Vol. 2. Routledge. doi:10.4324/9781315015811. ISBN 978-1-31501581-1.

== Reviews ==
- Ardener, Edwin (March 1967). "Purity and Danger: An Analysis of Concepts of Pollution and Taboo". Man. 2 (1): 139. doi:10.2307/2798681. JSTOR 2798681.
- Beidelman, Thomas O. (1966). "[Review of Purity and Danger : An Analysis of Concepts of Pollution and Taboo, by M. Douglas]". Anthropos. 61 (3). Nomos Verlag: 907–908. JSTOR 40458397.
- Bergesen, Albert James (1978). "Rituals, Symbols, and Society: Explicating the Mechanisms of the Moral Order". American Journal of Sociology. 83 (4): 1012–1021. doi:10.1086/226648. ISSN 0002-9602. (also dealing with Douglas's later book, Natural Symbols).
- Datta, Ronjon Paul (2005). "Book Review: Purity and Danger". Anthropological Theory. 5 (3): 301–302. doi:10.1177/1463499605055724. ISSN 1463-4996.
- Davidoff, Leonore (19 May 1995). "Speaking Volumes: Purity and Danger". Times Higher Education Supplement. Archived from the original on 2011-12-11.
- Gulliver, P. H. (1967). "[Review of Purity and Danger: An Analysis of Concepts of Pollution and Taboo, by M. Douglas]". Bulletin of the School of Oriental and African Studies. 30 (2): 462–464. doi:10.1017/S0041977X00062765. JSTOR 611049.
- Kunz, Phillip R. (1969). "Purity and Danger: An Analysis of Concepts of Pollution and Taboo". Review of Religious Research. 10 (2): 114–115. doi:10.2307/3510915. JSTOR 3510915.
- Madge, Charles (1967). "[Review of Purity and Danger: An analysis of concepts of pollution and taboo, by M. Douglas]". Sociology. 1 (2): 209–210. doi:10.1177/003803856700100211. JSTOR 42850525.
- McCormack, William; Douglas, Mary (Autumn 1967). "Purity and Danger: An Analysis of Concepts of Pollution and Taboo". Journal for the Scientific Study of Religion. 6 (2): 313–314. doi:10.2307/1384077. JSTOR 1384077.
- Roux, J.-P. (1968). "[Review of Purity and Danger. An analysis of concepts of pollution and taboo, by M. Douglas]". Revue de l'histoire des Religions. 174 (2): 229. JSTOR 23668319.
- Spiro, Melford E. (1968). "[Review of Purity and Danger: An Analysis of Concepts of Pollution and Taboo, by M. Douglas]". American Anthropologist. 70 (2): 391–393. doi:10.1525/aa.1968.70.2.02a00530. JSTOR 671165.
- Tamney, Joseph B. (1967). "Purity and Danger: An Analysis of Concepts of Pollution and Taboo". Sociological Analysis. 28 (1): 56–57. doi:10.2307/3710425. JSTOR 3710425.

== See also ==
- Sacred contagion
