= Opposition to water fluoridation =

Debate over the anti-tooth-decay measure

Opposition to the addition of fluoride to drinking water arises from political, ethical, economic, and health considerations. International and national agencies and dental associations across the world support the safety and effectiveness of water fluoridation. Proponents see it as a question of public health policy and equate the issue to vaccination and food fortification, citing significant benefits to dental health and minimal risks. In contrast, opponents view it as an infringement of individual rights, if not an outright violation of medical ethics, on the basis that individuals have no choice in the water that they drink, unless they drink more expensive bottled water. A small minority of scientists have challenged the medical consensus, variously claiming that water fluoridation has no or little cariostatic benefits, may cause serious health problems, is not effective enough to justify the costs, or is pharmacologically obsolete.

Opposition to fluoridation has existed since its initiation in the 1940s. During the 1950s and 1960s, conspiracy theorists claimed that fluoridation was a communist plot to undermine American public health. In recent years, water fluoridation has become a prevalent health and political issue in many countries, resulting in some countries and communities discontinuing its use while it has expanded in others. The controversy is propelled by a significant public opposition supported by a minority of professionals, which include researchers, dental and medical professionals, alternative medical practitioners, health food enthusiasts, a few religious groups (mostly Christian Scientists in the U.S.), and occasionally consumer groups and environmentalists. Organized political opposition has come from libertarians, the John Birch Society,, Robert F. Kennedy Jr., and the Green Party of the United States.

Proponents of fluoridation have been criticized for overstating the benefits, while opponents have been criticized for understating them and for overstating the risks. Systematic reviews have cited the lack of high quality research for the benefits and risks of water fluoridation and questions that are still unsettled. Researchers who oppose the practice state this as well. According to a 2013 Congressional Research Service report on fluoride in drinking water, these gaps in the fluoridation scientific literature fuel the controversy.

Public water fluoridation was first practiced in 1945 in the U.S. As of 2015, about 25 countries have supplemental water fluoridation to varying degrees, and 11 of them have more than 50% of their population drinking fluoridated water. A further 28 countries have water that is naturally fluoridated, though in many of them there are areas where fluoride is above the optimum level. As of 2012, about 435 million people worldwide received water fluoridated at the recommended level, of whom 57 million (13%) received naturally fluoridated water and 377 million (87%) received artificially fluoridated water. In 2014, three-quarters of the US population on the public water supply received fluoridated water, which represented two-thirds of the total US population.

== Medical consensus ==
National and international health agencies and dental associations throughout the world have endorsed water fluoridation as safe and effective. The views on the most effective method for community prevention of tooth decay are mixed. The Australian government states that water fluoridation is the most effective means of achieving fluoride exposure that is community-wide. The World Health Organization states water fluoridation, when feasible and culturally acceptable, has substantial advantages, especially for subgroups at high risk, while the European Commission finds no advantage to water fluoridation compared with topical use.

FDI World Dental Federation supports water fluoridation as safe and effective. the European Academy of Paediatric Dentistry, and the national dental associations of Australia, Canada, and the U.S. The American Dental Association calls water fluoridation "one of the safest and most beneficial, cost-effective public health measures for preventing, controlling, and in some cases reversing, tooth decay."

In the English speaking nations—the United States, Canada, UK, Australia and New Zealand, all of which practice water fluoridation—many medical associations and authorities have published position statements and endorsed water fluoridation. The U.S. Surgeon General, the American Public Health Association, the Royal Commission on the National Health Service, Australian Medical Association, New Zealand Medical Association, and Health Canada support fluoridation, citing a number of international scientific reviews that indicate "there is no link between any adverse health effects and exposure to fluoride in drinking water at levels that are below the maximum acceptable concentration of 1.5 mg/L." The Centers for Disease Control and Prevention listed water fluoridation as one of the ten great public health achievements of the 20th century in the U.S., along with vaccination, family planning, recognition of the dangers of smoking, and other achievements.

In Israel, the Israeli Association of Public Health Physicians, the Israel Pediatric Association, and the Israel Dental Association, support fluoridation. The World Health Organization, looking at global public health, identifies fluoride as one of a few chemicals for which the contribution from drinking-water to overall intake is an important factor in preventing disease. This is because there is clear evidence that optimal concentrations of fluoride provide protection against cavities, both in children and in adults.

There is a minor scientific view against water fluoridation. The scientists or doctors who oppose water fluoridation argue that it has no or little cariostatic benefits, may cause serious health problems, is not effective enough to justify the costs, and is pharmacologically obsolete.

== Evidence ==
Proponents and opponents have been both criticized for overstating the benefits or risks, and understating the other, respectively. Systematic reviews have cited the lack of high-quality research for the benefits and risks of water fluoridation and questions that are still unsettled. A 2007 Nuffield Council on Bioethics report concluded that good evidence for or against water fluoridation is lacking. Researchers who oppose the practice state this as well. According to a 2013 Congressional Research Service report on fluoride in drinking water, these gaps in the fluoridation scientific literature fuel the controversy. John Doull, chairman of the 2006 National Research Council committee report on fluoride in drinking water, has stated a similar conclusion regarding the source of the controversy: "In the scientific community, people tend to think this is settled. I mean, when the U.S. surgeon general comes out and says this is one of the 10 greatest achievements of the 20th century, that's a hard hurdle to get over. But when we looked at the studies that have been done, we found that many of these questions are unsettled and we have much less information than we should, considering how long this [fluoridation] has been going on. I think that's why fluoridation is still being challenged so many years after it began. In the face of ignorance, controversy is rampant."

=== Safety ===
Fluoride can be present naturally in water at concentrations well above recommended levels, which can have several long-term adverse effects, including severe dental fluorosis, skeletal fluorosis, and weakened bones. In 1984 the World Health Organization recommended a guideline maximum fluoride value of 1.5 mg/L as a level at which fluorosis should be minimal, reaffirming it in 2006.

Fluoridation has little effect on risk of bone fracture (broken bones); it may result in slightly lower fracture risk than either excessively high levels of fluoridation or no fluoridation. There is no clear association between fluoridation and cancer or deaths due to cancer, both for cancer in general and specifically for bone cancer and osteosarcoma.

In rare cases improper implementation of water fluoridation can result in overfluoridation that causes outbreaks of acute fluoride poisoning, with symptoms that include nausea, vomiting, and diarrhea. Three such outbreaks were reported in the U.S. between 1991 and 1998, caused by fluoride concentrations as high as 220 mg/L; in the 1992 Alaska outbreak, 262 people became ill and one person died. In 2010, approximately 60 gallons of fluoride were released into the water supply in Asheboro, North Carolina, in 90 minutes—an amount that was intended to be released in a 24-hour period.

Like other common water additives such as chlorine, hydrofluosilicic acid and sodium silicofluoride decrease pH and cause a small increase of corrosivity, but this problem is easily addressed by increasing the pH. Although it has been hypothesized that hydrofluosilicic acid and sodium silicofluoride might increase human lead uptake from water, a 2006 statistical analysis did not support concerns that these chemicals cause higher blood lead concentrations in children. Trace levels of arsenic and lead may be present in fluoride compounds added to water; however, concentrations are below measurement limits.

The effect of water fluoridation on the natural environment has been investigated, and no adverse effects have been established. Issues studied have included fluoride concentrations in groundwater and downstream rivers; lawns, gardens, and plants; consumption of plants grown in fluoridated water; air emissions; and equipment noise.

=== Efficacy ===
Reviews have shown that water fluoridation reduces cavities in children. A conclusion for the efficacy in adults is less clear with some reviews finding benefit and others not. Studies in the U.S. in the 1950s and 1960s showed that water fluoridation reduced childhood cavities by fifty to sixty percent, while studies in 1989 and 1990 showed lower reductions (40% and 18% respectively), likely due to increasing use of fluoride from other sources, notably toothpaste, and the "halo effect" of food and drink that is made in fluoridated areas and consumed in unfluoridated ones.

A 2000 UK systematic review (York) found that water fluoridation was associated with a decreased proportion of children with cavities of 15% and with a decrease in decayed, missing, and filled primary teeth (average decreases was 2.25 teeth). The review found that the evidence was of moderate quality: few studies attempted to reduce observer bias, control for confounding factors, report variance measures, or use appropriate analysis. Although no major differences between natural and artificial fluoridation were apparent, the evidence was inadequate for a conclusion about any differences. A 2002 systematic review found strong evidence that water fluoridation is effective at reducing overall tooth decay in communities. A 2015 Cochrane review also found benefit in children.

Fluoride may also prevent cavities in adults of all ages. A 2007 meta-analysis by CDC researchers found that water fluoridation prevented an estimated 27% of cavities in adults, about the same fraction as prevented by exposure to any delivery method of fluoride (29% average). A 2011 European Commission review concluded that water fluoridation has no known advantage over topical prevention (e.g. through fluoride toothpaste). It also found that water fluoridation has limited benefit for adults, because the continued administration of systemic fluoride after the permanent teeth have erupted has questionable efficacy in preventing tooth decay. A 2015 Cochrane review found no conclusive research in adults.

Most countries in Europe have experienced substantial declines in cavities without the use of water fluoridation. For example, in Finland and Germany, tooth decay rates remained stable or continued to decline after water fluoridation stopped. Fluoridation may be useful in the U.S. because unlike most European countries, the U.S. does not have school-based dental care, many children do not visit a dentist regularly, and for many U.S. children water fluoridation is the prime source of exposure to fluoride. The effectiveness of water fluoridation can vary according to circumstances such as whether preventive dental care is free to all children.

== Ethics ==
Water fluoridation pits the common good against individual rights. Some say the common good overrides individual rights, and equate it to vaccination and food fortification. Others say that individual rights override the common good, and say that individuals have no choice in the water that they drink, unless they drink more expensive bottled water, and some argue unequivocally that it does not stand up to scrutiny relative to the Nuremberg Code and other codes of medical ethics.

Those who emphasize the public good emphasize the medical consensus that appropriate levels of water fluoridation are safe and effective to prevent cavities and see it as a public health intervention, replicating the benefits of naturally fluoridated water, which can free people from the misery and expense of tooth decay and toothache, with the greatest benefit accruing to those least able to help themselves. This perspective suggests it would be unethical to withhold such treatment. In her book 50 Health Scares That Fizzled, Joan Callahan writes that, "For lower-income people with no insurance, fluoridated water (like enriched flour and fortified milk) looks more like a free preventative health measure that a few elitists are trying to take away."

Those who emphasize individual or local choice, may view fluoridation as a violation of ethical or legal rules that prohibit medical treatment without medical supervision or informed consent or that prohibit administration of unlicensed medical substances, view it as "mass medication", or may even characterize it as a violation of the Nuremberg Code and the Council of Europe's Biomedical Convention of 1999. Another journal article suggested applying the precautionary principle to this controversy, which calls for public policy to reflect a conservative approach to minimize risk in the setting where harm is possible (but not necessarily confirmed) and where the science is not settled. Others have opposed it on the grounds of potential financial conflicts of interest driven by the chemical industry.

A 2007 Nuffield Council on Bioethics report reached a conclusion mainly on three points, stating that :

- The balance of benefit to risk ratio – is unclear due to the lack of good evidence for or against water fluoridation.
- Alternatives to the practice exist – topical fluoride therapy (toothbrushing, etc.)
- The role of consent – it gets priority when there are potential harms.

The report therefore concluded that local and regional democratic procedures are the most appropriate way to decide whether to fluoridate.

== Opposition groups and campaigns ==
The controversy is propelled by a significant public opposition supported by a minority of professionals, including researchers, dental and medical professionals, alternative medical practitioners such as chiropractors, health food enthusiasts, a few religious groups (mostly Christian Scientists in the U.S.), and occasionally consumer groups and environmentalists. Organized political opposition has come from libertarians, the John Birch Society, the Ku Klux Klan, and from groups like the Green parties in the UK and New Zealand.

Opposition campaigns involve newspaper articles, talk radio, and public forums. Media reporters are often poorly equipped to explain the scientific issues, and are motivated to present controversy regardless of the underlying scientific merits. Websites, which are increasingly used by the public for health information, contain a wide range of material about fluoridation ranging from factual to fraudulent, with a disproportionate percentage opposed to fluoridation. Antifluoridationist literature links fluoride exposure to a wide variety of effects, including AIDS, allergy, Alzheimer's disease, arthritis, cancer, and low IQ, along with diseases of the gastrointestinal tract, kidney, pineal gland, and thyroid, though there is no scientific evidence linking fluoridation to these adverse health effects.

== Public opinion ==
Many people do not know that fluoridation is meant to prevent tooth decay, or that natural or bottled water can contain fluoride. As fluoridation does not appear to be an important issue for the general public in the U.S., the debate may reflect an argument between two relatively small lobbies for and against fluoridation. A survey of Australians in 2009 found that 70% supported and 15% opposed fluoridation. Those opposed were much more likely to score higher on outrage factors such as "unclear benefits".

A study of focus groups from 16 European countries in 2003 found that fluoridation was opposed by a majority of focus group members in most of the countries, including France, Germany, and the UK. A survey in Sheffield, UK, performed in 1999 found that while a 62% majority favored water fluoridation in the city, the 31% who were opposed expressed their preference with greater intensity than supporters. Every year in the U.S., pro- and anti-fluoridationists face off in referendums or other public decision-making processes: in most of them, fluoridation is rejected.

== Use throughout the world ==
Percentage of population receiving fluoridated water, including both artificial and natural fluoridation, as of 2012: 80–100% 60–80% 40–60% 20–40% 1–20% < 1% unknown

A 2012 study found that 25 countries have artificial water fluoridation to varying degrees, with 11 of them delivering fluoridated water to more than 50% of their population. It found that a further 28 countries have water that is naturally fluoridated, though in many of them the fluoride concentration is above the maximum recommended level. About 435 million people worldwide received water fluoridated at the recommended level, with about 211 million of them living in the United States.

Despite support by public health organizations and dental authorities, the practice is controversial as a public health measure; some countries and communities have discontinued it, while others have expanded it. In the U.S., rejection in state and local communities is more likely when the decision is made by a public referendum; in Europe, most decisions against fluoridation have been made administratively. Neither side of the dispute appears to be weakening or willing to concede.

Water fluoridation is used in the United States, United Kingdom, Ireland, Canada, Australia, Israel, Hong Kong and a handful of other countries. Most countries failed to adopt fluoridation, yet experienced the same or greater decline in cavities as those countries that did fluoridate during the later half of the twentieth century. The following nations previously fluoridated their water, but stopped the practice, with the years when water fluoridation started and stopped in parentheses:

- Federal Republic of Germany (1952–1971)
- Sweden (1952–1971)
- Netherlands (1953–1976)
- Czechoslovakia (1955–1990)
- German Democratic Republic (1959–1990)
- Soviet Union (1960–1990)
- Finland (1959–1993)
- Japan (1952–1972)
- Israel (1981–2014, 2016–) *Mandatory by law since 2002.

Water had been fluoridated in Israel in all major cities since 1981. This was stopped by the Minister of Health in 2014 which was met with backlash. The subsequent Minister of Health in 2016 ordered the reintroduction of fluoride to Israel's public drinking water. Due to budgetary constraints, it has never taken effect. Dental health professionals and scholarly journals have noted the steep rise in tooth decay, especially in children due to the removal of fluoride in tap water in Israel.

In the United Kingdom a strategic health authority can direct a water company to fluoridate the water supply in an area if it is technically possible. The strategic health authority must consult with the local community and businesses in the affected area. The water company will act as a contractor in any new schemes and cannot refuse to fluoridate the supply. In areas with complex water sources, water fluoridation is more difficult and more costly. Alternative fluoridation methods have been proposed, and implemented in some parts of the world. The World Health Organization (WHO) is currently assessing the effects of fluoridated toothpaste, milk fluoridation and salt fluoridation in Africa, Asia, and Europe. The WHO supports fluoridation of water in some areas. In some other countries, sodium fluoride is added to table salt.

== History ==
Fluoridation began during a time of great optimism and faith in science and experts (the 1950s and 1960s); even then, the public frequently objected. Opponents drew on distrust of experts and unease about medicine and science. Controversies include disputes over fluoridation's benefits and the strength of the evidence basis for these benefits, the difficulty of identifying harms, legal issues over whether water fluoride is a medicine, and the ethics of mass intervention.

The first large fluoridation controversy occurred in Wisconsin in 1950. Fluoridation opponents questioned the ethics, safety, and efficacy of fluoridation. Rio Vista, the first city in California to fluoridate its water in 1951, voted to remove their fluoridation equipment in 1956. New Zealand was the second country to fluoridate, and similar controversies arose there. Fears about fluoride were likely exacerbated by the reputation of fluoride compounds as insect poisons and by early literature which tended to use terms such as "toxic" and "low grade chronic fluoride poisoning" to describe mottling from consumption of 6 mg/L of fluoride prior to tooth eruption, a level of consumption not expected to occur under controlled fluoridation. When voted upon, the outcomes tend to be negative, and thus fluoridation has had a history of gaining through administrative orders in North America.

Conspiracy theories involving fluoridation are common, and include claims that fluoridation was motivated by protecting the U.S. atomic bomb program from litigation, that (as famously parodied in the film Dr. Strangelove, where a deranged U.S. Air Force general claimed that it would "sap and impurify all of our precious bodily fluids") it is part of a Communist or New World Order plot to take over the world, that it was pioneered by a German chemical company to make people submissive to those in power, that behind the scenes it is promoted by the sugary food or phosphate fertilizer or aluminium industries, or that it is a smokescreen to cover failure to provide dental care to the poor. One such theory is that fluoridation was a public-relations ruse sponsored by fluoride polluters such as the aluminium maker Alcoa and the Manhattan Project, with conspirators that included industrialist Andrew Mellon and the Mellon Institute's researcher Gerald J. Cox, the Kettering Laboratory of the University of Cincinnati, the Federal Security Agency's administrator Oscar R. Ewing, and public-relations strategist Edward Bernays. Specific antifluoridation arguments change to match the spirit of the time.

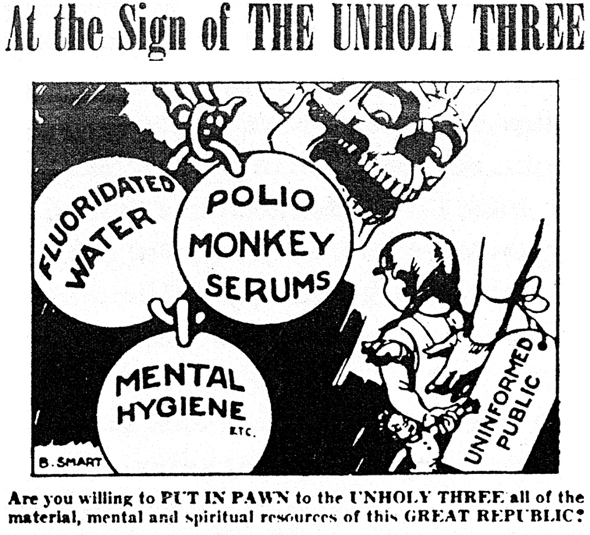
Illustration in a 1955 flier by the Keep America Committee, alleging that fluoridation was a Communist plot

Outside North America, water fluoridation was adopted in some European countries, but in the late 1970s and early 1980s, Denmark and Sweden banned fluoridation when government panels found insufficient evidence of safety, and the Netherlands banned water fluoridation when "a group of medical practitioners presented evidence" that it caused negative effects in a percentage of the population.

=== Communist conspiracy theory (1940s–1960s) ===
Water fluoridation has frequently been the subject of conspiracy theories. During the "Second Red Scare" in the United States during the late 1940s and 1950s, and to a lesser extent in the 1960s, activists on the far right of American politics routinely asserted that fluoridation was part of a far-reaching plot to impose a socialist or communist regime. These opponents believed it was "another aspect of President Truman's drive to socialize medicine." They also opposed other public health programs, notably mass vaccination and mental health services. Their views were influenced by opposition to a number of major social and political changes that had happened in recent years: the growth of internationalism, particularly the UN and its programs; the introduction of social welfare provisions, particularly the various programs established by the New Deal; and government efforts to reduce perceived inequalities in the social structure of the United States.

Others asserted the existence of "a Communist plot to deplete the brainpower and sap the strength of a generation of American children". Charles Betts, a prominent anti-fluoridationist, charged that fluoridation was "better than using the atom bomb because the atom bomb has to be made, has to be transported to the place it is to be set off while poisonous fluorine has been placed right beside the water supplies by the Americans themselves ready to be dumped into the water mains whenever a Communist desires!" Similarly, a right-wing newsletter, the American Capsule News, claimed that "the Soviet General Staff is very happy about it. Anytime they get ready to strike, and their 5th column takes over, there are tons and tons of this poison 'standing by' municipal and military water systems ready to be poured in within 15 minutes." This controversy had a direct impact on local program during the 1950s and 1960s, where referendums on introducing fluoridation were defeated in over a thousand Florida communities. It was not until as late as the 1990s that fluoridated water was consumed by the majority of the population of the United States.

The communist conspiracy argument declined in influence by the mid-1960s, becoming associated in the public mind with irrational fear and paranoia. It was portrayed in Stanley Kubrick's 1964 film Dr. Strangelove, in which the character General Jack D. Ripper initiates a nuclear war in the hope of thwarting a communist plot to "sap and impurify" the "precious bodily fluids" of the American people with fluoridated water. Another satire appeared in the 1967 movie In Like Flint, in which a character's fear of fluoridation is used to indicate that he is insane. Some anti-fluoridationists claimed that the conspiracy theories were damaging their goals; Frederick Exner, an anti-fluoridation campaigner in the early 1960s, told a conference: "most people are not prepared to believe that fluoridation is a communist plot, and if you say it is, you are successfully ridiculed by the promoters. It is being done, effectively, every day ... some of the people on our side are the fluoridators' 'fifth column'."

=== Later conspiracy theories ===
In 1987, Ian E. Stephens authored a self-published booklet, an extract of which was published in the Australian New Age publication Nexus in 1995. In it he claimed he was told by "Charles Elliot Perkins" that: "Repeated doses of infinitesimal amounts of fluoride will in time reduce an individual's power to resist domination by slowly poisoning and narcotising a certain area of the brain and will thus make him submissive to the will of those who wish to govern him ... Both the Germans and the Russians added sodium fluoride to the drinking water of prisoners of war to make them stupid and docile." These statements have been dismissed by reputable Holocaust historians as untrue, but they are regularly repeated to the present day in conspiracy publications and websites.

=== 2006 US NRC report ===
U.S. opponents of fluoridation were heartened by a 2006 National Research Council report about hazards of water naturally fluoridated to high levels; the report recommended lowering the U.S. maximum limit of 4 mg/L for fluoride in drinking water. The EPA did not act on that recommendation.

== Court cases ==
=== Ireland ===
In Ryan v. Attorney General (1965), the Supreme Court of Ireland held that water fluoridation did not infringe the plaintiff's right to bodily integrity. The court found that such a right to bodily integrity did exist, even though it was not explicitly mentioned in the Constitution of Ireland, thus establishing the doctrine of unenumerated rights in Irish constitutional law.

=== Netherlands ===
Water was fluoridated in large parts of the Netherlands from 1960 to 1973, at which point the Supreme Court of the Netherlands declared fluoridation of drinking water unauthorized. The Dutch Court decided that authorities had no legal basis for adding chemicals to drinking water if they did not also improve safety. It was also stated as support that consumers cannot choose a different tap water provider. Drinking water has not been fluoridated in any part of the Netherlands since 1973.

=== United States ===
Fluoridation has been the subject of many court cases wherein activists have sued municipalities, asserting that their rights to consent to medical treatment and due process are infringed by mandatory water fluoridation. Individuals have sued municipalities for a number of illnesses that they believe were caused by fluoridation of the city's water supply. In most of these cases, the courts have held in favor of cities, finding no or only a tenuous connection between health problems and widespread water fluoridation. To date, no federal appellate court or state court of last resort (i.e., state supreme court) has found water fluoridation to be unlawful.

In September 2024, in Food and Water Watch et al. v. United States Environmental Protection Agency, U.S. Federal Judge Edward Chen ruled that water fluoridation posed an, "unreasonable risk of reduced IQ in children…a risk sufficient to require the EPA to engage with a regulatory response…One thing the EPA cannot do, however, in the face of this Court's finding, is to ignore that risk."

== See also ==
- Fluoride therapy
- Fluoride toxicity
- Hexafluorosilicic acid
- Sodium monofluorophosphate
