= Risk perception =

Subjective judgement one makes of a risk

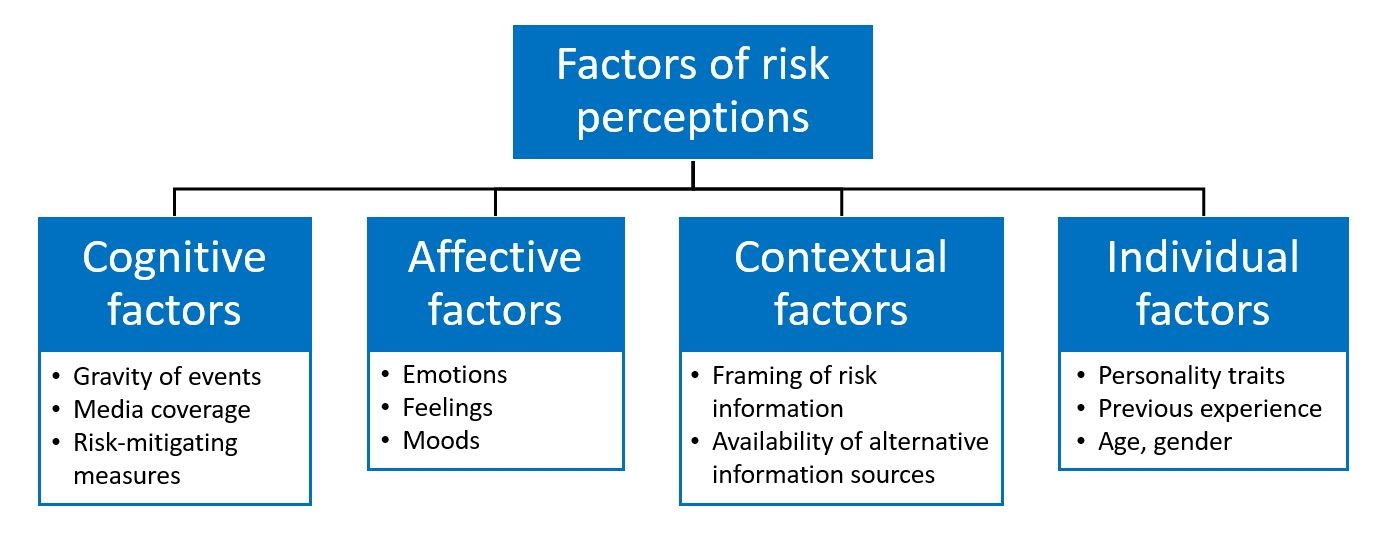
Factors of risk perceptions

Risk perception is the subjective judgement that people make about the characteristics and severity of a risk. Risk perceptions often differ from statistical assessments of risk since they are affected by a wide range of affective (emotions, feelings, moods, etc.), cognitive (gravity of events, media coverage, risk-mitigating measures, etc.), contextual (framing of risk information, availability of alternative information sources, etc.), and individual (personality traits, previous experience, age, etc.) factors. Several theories have been proposed to explain why different people make different estimates of the dangerousness of risks. Three major families of theory have been developed: psychology approaches (heuristics and cognitive), anthropology/sociology approaches (cultural theory) and interdisciplinary approaches (social amplification of risk framework).

== Early theories ==
The study of risk perception arose out of the observation that experts and lay people often disagreed about how risky various technologies and natural hazards were.

The mid 1960s saw the rapid rise of nuclear technologies and the promise of clean and safe energy. However, public perception shifted against this new technology. Fears of both longitudinal dangers to the environment and immediate disasters creating radioactive wastelands turned the public against this new technology. The scientific and governmental communities asked why public perception was against the use of nuclear energy when all the scientific experts were declaring how safe it really was. The problem, as non-experts perceived it, was a difference between scientific facts and an exaggerated public perception of the dangers.

A key early paper was written in 1969 by Chauncey Starr. Starr used a revealed preference approach to find out what risks are considered acceptable by society. He assumed that society had reached equilibrium in its judgment of risks, so whatever risk levels actually existed in society were acceptable. His major finding was that people will accept risks 1,000 times greater if they are voluntary (e.g. driving a car) than if they are involuntary (e.g. a nuclear disaster).

This early approach assumed that individuals behave rationally by weighing information before making a decision, and that individuals have exaggerated fears due to inadequate or incorrect information. Implied in this assumption is that additional information can help people understand true risk and hence lessen their opinion of danger. In risk communication, this understanding led to the deficit model (presuming that lay people have a knowledge deficit), one of the earliest models of communicating risk to the public. While researchers in the engineering school did pioneer research in risk perception, by adapting theories from economics, it has little use in a practical setting. Numerous studies have rejected the belief that additional information alone will shift perceptions, therefore risk communication later moved toward dialogue-based, participatory and partnership models that involve the public more actively.

== Psychological approach ==
The psychological approach began with research in trying to understand how people process information. These early works maintained that people use cognitive heuristics in sorting and simplifying information, leading to biases in comprehension. Later work built on this foundation and became the psychometric paradigm. This approach identifies numerous factors responsible for influencing individual perceptions of risk, including dread, novelty, stigma, and other factors.

Research also shows that risk perceptions are influenced by the emotional state of the perceiver. The valence theory of risk perception only differentiates between positive emotions, such as happiness and optimism, and negative ones, such as fear and anger. According to valence theory, positive emotions lead to optimistic risk perceptions whereas negative emotions influence a more pessimistic view of risk.

Research also has found that, whereas risk and benefit tend to be positively correlated across hazardous activities in the world, they are negatively correlated in people's minds and judgements.

=== Heuristics and biases ===
The earliest psychometric research was done by psychologists Daniel Kahneman and Amos Tversky, who performed a series of gambling experiments to see how people evaluated probabilities. Their major finding was that people use a number of heuristics to evaluate information. These heuristics are usually useful shortcuts for thinking, but they may lead to inaccurate judgments in some situations – in which case they become cognitive biases.

- Representativeness: is usually employed when people are asked to judge the probability that an object or event belongs to a class / processes by its similarity:
  - insensitivity to prior probability
  - insensitivity to sample size
  - misconception of chance
  - insensitivity to predictability
  - illusion of validity
  - misconception of regression
- Availability heuristic: events that can be more easily brought to mind or imagined are judged to be more likely than events that could not easily be imagined:
  - biases due to retrievability of instances
  - biases due to the effectiveness of research set
  - biases of imaginability
  - illusory correlation
- Anchoring and Adjustment heuristic: people will often start with one piece of known information and then adjust it to create an estimate of an unknown risk – but the adjustment will usually not be big enough:
  - insufficient adjustment
  - biases in the evaluation of conjunctive and disjunctive event (conjunction fallacy)
  - anchoring in the assessment of subjective probability distributions
- Asymmetry between gains and losses: People are risk averse with respect to gains, preferring a sure thing over a gamble with a higher expected utility but which presents the possibility of getting nothing. On the other hand, people will be risk-seeking about losses, preferring to hope for the chance of losing nothing rather than taking a sure, but smaller, loss (e.g. insurance).
- Threshold effects: People prefer to move from uncertainty to certainty over making a similar gain in certainty that does not lead to full certainty. For example, most people would choose a vaccine that reduces the incidence of disease A from 10% to 0% over one that reduces the incidence of disease B from 20% to 10%.

Another key finding was that the experts are not necessarily any better at estimating probabilities than lay people. Experts were often overconfident in the exactness of their estimates, and put too much stock in small samples of data.

=== Cognitive Psychology ===
The majority of people in the public express a greater concern for problems which appear to possess an immediate effect on everyday life such as hazardous waste or pesticide-use than for long-term problems that may affect future generations such as climate change or population growth. People greatly rely on the scientific community to assess the threat of environmental problems because they usually do not directly experience the effects of phenomena such as climate change. The exposure most people have to climate change has been impersonal; most people only have virtual experience through documentaries and news media in what may seem like a “remote” area of the world. However, coupled with the population’s wait-and-see attitude, people do not understand the importance of changing environmentally destructive behaviors even when experts provide detailed and clear risks caused by climate change.

=== Psychometric paradigm ===
Research within the psychometric paradigm turned to focus on the roles of affect, emotion, and stigma in influencing risk perception. Melissa Finucane and Paul Slovic have been among the key researchers here. These researchers first challenged Starr's article by examining expressed preference – how much risk people say they are willing to accept. They found that, contrary to Starr's basic assumption, people generally saw most risks in society as being unacceptably high. They also found that the gap between voluntary and involuntary risks was not nearly as great as Starr claimed.

Slovic and team found that perceived risk is quantifiable and predictable. People tend to view current risk levels as unacceptably high for most activities. All things being equal, the greater people perceived a benefit, the greater the tolerance for a risk. Following Starr's research concluding that risks taken voluntarily are perceived by the public as a thousand times more acceptable than non-voluntary risks, Slovic found that voluntary risks were also perceived to be more controllable. Accidents and unfortunate events can affect risk perception: for example, the Three Mile Island accident lead to stricter regulation of the nuclear industry, as a result of increased perceived risk. If a person derived pleasure from using a product, people tended to judge its benefits as high and its risks as low. If the activity was disliked, the judgments were opposite. Research in psychometrics has proven that risk perception is highly dependent on intuition, experiential thinking, and emotions.

Psychometric research identified a broad domain of characteristics that may be condensed into three high order factors: 1) the degree to which a risk is understood, 2) the degree to which it evokes a feeling of dread, and 3) the number of people exposed to the risk. A dread risk elicits visceral feelings of terror, uncontrollable, catastrophe, inequality, and uncontrolled. An unknown risk is new and unknown to science. The more a person dreads an activity, the higher its perceived risk and the more that person wants the risk reduced.

== Anthropology/sociology approach ==
The anthropology/sociology approach posits risk perceptions as produced by and supporting social institutions. In this view, perceptions are socially constructed by institutions, cultural values, and ways of life.

=== Cultural theory ===
One line of the Cultural Theory of risk is based on the work of anthropologist Mary Douglas and political scientist Aaron Wildavsky first published in 1982. In cultural theory, Douglas and Wildavsky outline four “ways of life” in a grid/group arrangement. Each way of life corresponds to a specific social structure and a particular outlook on risk. Grid categorizes the degree to which people are constrained and circumscribed in their social role. The tighter binding of social constraints limits individual negotiation. Group refers to the extent to which individuals are bounded by feelings of belonging or solidarity. The greater the bonds, the less individual choice are subject to personal control. Four ways of life include: Hierarchical, Individualist, Egalitarian, and Fatalist.

Risk perception researchers have not widely accepted this version of cultural theory. Even Douglas says that the theory is controversial; it poses a danger of moving out of the favored paradigm of individual rational choice of which many researchers are comfortable.

On the other hand, writers who drawn upon a broader cultural theory perspective have argued that risk-perception analysis helps understand the public response to terrorism in a way that goes far beyond 'rational choice'. As John Handmer and Paul James write:

In the area of embodied risk, people are not as fearful of the themselves as perhaps they should be on the issues of illicit drug use, unsafe sex and so on. Yet with the compounding of both more abstract and more embodied risk this package appears to have met its goal to generate support for government policy. Fear of 'outsiders' and of a non-specific, invisible and uncontrollable threat was a powerful motivator in shaping perception.

=== National Culture and Risk Survey ===
The First National Culture and Risk Survey of cultural cognition found that a person's worldview on the two social and cultural dimensions of "hierarchy-egalitarianism," and "individualism-solidarism" was predictive of their response to risk.

== Interdisciplinary approach ==
=== Social amplification of risk framework ===
The Social Amplification of Risk Framework (SARF), combines research in psychology, sociology, anthropology, and communications theory. SARF outlines how communications of risk events pass from the sender through intermediate stations to a receiver and in the process serve to amplify or attenuate perceptions of risk. All links in the communication chain, individuals, groups, media, etc., contain filters through which information is sorted and understood.

The framework attempts to explain the process by which risks are amplified, receiving public attention, or attenuated, receiving less public attention. The framework may be used to compare responses from different groups in a single event, or analyze the same risk issue in multiple events. In a single risk event, some groups may amplify their perception of risks while other groups may attenuate, or decrease, their perceptions of risk.

The main thesis of SARF states that risk events interact with individual psychological, social and other cultural factors in ways that either increase or decrease public perceptions of risk. Behaviors of individuals and groups then generate secondary social or economic impacts while also increasing or decreasing the physical risk itself.

Media coverage often serves as a key amplification station within this process. For example, a 2026 randomized controlled trial in occupational safety found that repeated weekly exposure to news reports regarding childhood agricultural injuries increased farm parents' perceived severity of farm hazards and reinforced their intents to adopt safety practices.

These ripple effects caused by the amplification of risk include enduring mental perceptions, impacts on business sales, and change in residential property values, changes in training and education, or social disorder. These secondary changes are perceived and reacted to by individuals and groups resulting in third-order impacts. As each higher-order impacts are reacted to, they may ripple to other parties and locations. Traditional risk analyses neglect these ripple effect impacts and thus greatly underestimate the adverse effects from certain risk events. Public distortion of risk signals provides a corrective mechanism by which society assesses a fuller determination of the risk and its impacts to such things not traditionally factored into a risk analysis.

== See also ==
- Risk
- Risk communication
- Cultural theory of risk
- Fuzzy-trace theory
- Foresight
