= Outrage factor =

In public policy, outrage factor is public opposition to a policy that is not based on the knowledge of the technical details. The term "outrage factor" originates from Peter Sandman's 1993 book, Responding to Community Outrage: Strategies for Effective Risk Communication.

== Causes ==
"Outrage factors" are the emotional factors that influence perception of risk. The risks that are considered involuntary, industrial and unfair are often given more weight than factors that are thought of as voluntary, natural and fair.

Sandman gives the formula:

Risk = Hazard + Outrage

The following are listed in Covello and Sandman's 2001 article, Risk Communication: Evolution and Revolution

Factor	Risks considered to…	Are less acceptable than…
Voluntariness	Be involuntary or imposed	Risks from voluntary activities
Controllability	Be under the control of others	Risks under individual control
Familiarity	Be unfamiliar	Risks associated with familiar activities
Fairness	Be unfair or involve unfair processes	Risks from fair activities
Benefits	Have unclear, questionable, or diffused personal or economic benefits	Risks from activities with clear benefits
Catastrophic potential	Have the potential to cause a significant number of deaths and injuries at once	Risks from activities that cause deaths and injuries at random or over a long period of time
Understanding	Be poorly understood	Well understood or self-explanatory risks
Uncertainty	Be relatively unknown or are highly uncertain	Risks from activities that appear to be relatively well known to science
Delayed effects	Have delayed effects	Risks from activities that have immediate effects
Effects on children	Put children specifically at risk	Risks that appear to primarily affect adults
Effects on future generations	Pose a threat to future generations	Risks from activities that do not
Victim Identity	Produce identifiable victims	Risks that produce statistical victims
Dread	Evoke fear, terror, or anxiety	Risks from activities that don’t arouse such feelings and emotions
Trust	Be associated with individuals, institutions, or organizations lacking in trust and credibility	Risks from activities associated with those that are trustworthy and credible
Media attention	Receive considerable media coverage	Risks from activities that receive little coverage
Accident history	Have a history of major accidents or frequent minor accidents	Risks from activities with little to no such history
Reversibility	Have potentially irreversible adverse effects	Risks from activities considered to have reversible adverse effects
Personal stake	Place people or their families personally and directly at risk	Risks from activities that pose no direct or personal threat
Ethical/moral nature	Be ethically objectionable or morally wrong	Risks from ethically neutral activities
Human vs. natural origin	Generated by human action, failure, or incompetence	Risks believed to be caused by nature or “Acts of God”

== Risk communications ==
While policy analysis by institutional stakeholders typically focuses on risk-benefit analysis and cost-benefit analysis, popular risk perception is not informed by the same concerns. The successful implementation of a policy relying on public support and cooperation must address the outrage factor when informing the public about the policy.

In an interview with New York Times journalist and Freakonomics author Stephen J. Dubner, Sandman emphasized "the most important truth in risk communication is the exceedingly low correlation between whether a risk is dangerous, and whether it's upsetting".

The relevance of public outrage has been acknowledged in discussions of various policy debates, including

- nuclear safety.
- terrorism.
- public health.
- environmental management.

== See also ==
- Cultural theory of risk
- Risk aversion
- Risk perception
- Worry
