= Mary Douglas =

British anthropologist (1921–2007)

Dame Mary Douglas DBE FBA
- Born: Margaret Mary Tew; 25 March 1921; Sanremo, Kingdom of Italy
- Died: 16 May 2007 (aged 86); London, England
- Education: University of Oxford
- Known for: Purity and Danger (1966), Natural Symbols (1970), Cultural theory of risk
- Scientific career
- Fields: Social anthropology, Comparative religion
- Workplaces: University College London, Russell Sage Foundation, Northwestern University, Princeton University
- Doctoral advisor: E. E. Evans-Pritchard

Dame Mary Douglas (25 March 1921 – 16 May 2007) was a British anthropologist, known for her writings on human culture, symbolism and risk, whose area of speciality was social anthropology. Douglas was considered a follower of Émile Durkheim and a proponent of structuralist analysis, with a strong interest in comparative religion.

== Biography ==
She was born as Margaret Mary Tew in Sanremo, Italy, to Gilbert and Phyllis (née Twomey) Tew. Her father, Gilbert Tew, was a member of the Indian Civil Service serving in Burma, as was her maternal grandfather, Sir Daniel Twomey, who retired as the Chief Judge of the Chief Court of Lower Burma. Her mother was a devout Roman Catholic, and Mary and her younger sister, Patricia, were raised in that faith. After their mother's death, the sisters were raised by their maternal grandparents and attended the Roman Catholic Sacred Heart Convent in Roehampton. Mary went on to study at St. Anne's College, Oxford, from 1939 to 1943; there she was influenced by E. E. Evans-Pritchard. She graduated with a second-class degree.

She worked in the British Colonial Office, where she encountered many social anthropologists. In 1946, Douglas returned to Oxford to take a "conversion" course in anthropology and registered for the doctorate in anthropology in 1949. She studied with M. N. Srinivas as well as E. E. Evans-Pritchard. In 1949 she did field work with the Lele people in what was then the Belgian Congo; this took her to village life in the region between the Kasai River and the Loange River, where the Lele lived on the edge of what had previously been the Kuba Kingdom. Ultimately, a civil war prevented her from continuing her fieldwork, but nevertheless, this led to Douglas' first publication, The Lele of the Kasai, published in 1963.

In the early 1950s, she completed her doctorate and married James Douglas. Like her, he was a Catholic and had been born into a colonial family (in Simla, while his father served in the Indian army). They had three children. She taught at University College London, where she remained for around 25 years, becoming Professor of Social Anthropology.

Her reputation was established by her most celebrated book, Purity and Danger (1966).

She wrote The World of Goods (1978) with an econometrist, Baron Isherwood, which was considered a pioneering work on economic anthropology. She co-authored with Aaron Wildavsky a book on risk and danger. They used the cultural theory of risk to explore how and why social groups disregard some dangers but identify others as risks that require mitigating action.

She taught and wrote in the United States for 11 years. She published on such subjects as risk analysis and the environment, consumption and welfare economics, and food and ritual, all increasingly cited outside anthropology circles. After four years (1977–81) as Foundation Research Professor of Cultural Studies at the Russell Sage Foundation in New York, she moved to Northwestern University as Avalon Professor of the Humanities with a remit to link the studies of theology and anthropology, and spent three years at Princeton University. She received an honorary doctorate from the Faculty of Humanities at Uppsala University, Sweden in 1986. In the Fall of 1987, she was a Fellow at the Swedish Collegium for Advanced Study in Uppsala. In 1988 she returned to Britain, where she gave the Gifford Lectures in 1989.

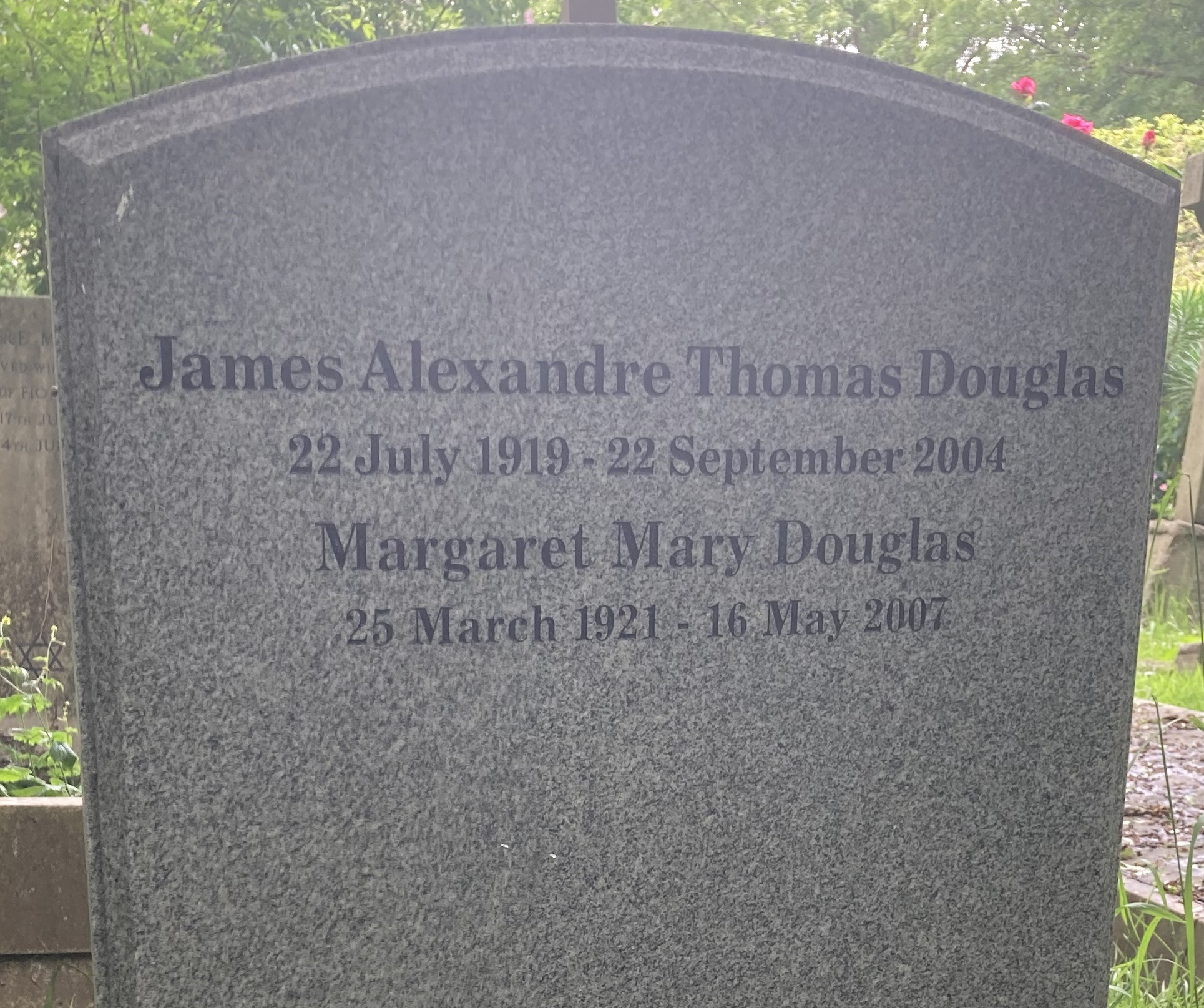
Family grave of Mary Douglas in Highgate Cemetery

In 1989 she was elected a Fellow of the British Academy. She became a Commander of the Order of the British Empire (CBE) in 1992, and was appointed Dame Commander of the Order of the British Empire (DBE) in the Queen's New Year's Honours List published on 30 December 2006. She died on 16 May 2007 in London, aged 86, from complications of cancer, survived by her three children. She was buried in Highgate Cemetery, alongside her husband James, who had died in 2004.

In 2002 a twelve volume edition of her "Collected work" was published by Routledge.

== Contributions to anthropology ==
=== Fieldwork and Ethnography: The Lele of the Kasai ===
When Mary Douglas started her fieldwork in the late 1940s in the Belgian Congo, British social anthropology was a small elite discipline dominated by men who, as Edmund Leach caustically commented, saw themselves as gentlemen scholars. Entry to this elite club involved undertaking intense ethnographic fieldwork following the model developed by Bronislaw Malinowski in the Trobriand Islands. Edmund Leach described this approach to anthropology as ‘butterfly collecting’, it was a way of recording ‘Other Cultures’ before they were overwhelmed by European political, religious and cultural institutions. Underpinning this approach was a paradox, social anthropologists worked alongside colonial officials, indeed their safety could depend on the intervention of such officials yet, in their accounts of these other cultures, such colonial interventions were conspicuous by their absence. For example in his ethnography of the Nuer in Southern Sudan, Evans-Pritchard omits to mention that the Nuer were in conflict with the British Colonial authorities in Khartoum who sent planes to intimidate them and even bomb their cattle.

For the most part, Mary Douglas’s ethnography of the Lele hand cultivators who lived in the forests of South Western Belgian Congo, follows the conventional pattern of contemporary ethnographies. Working in the structural function tradition in which the anthropologist seeks to identify the key structures and institutions and examines how they work to maintain society, Douglas explored how the Lele maintained social stability when there was no apparent authority, no leaders with legitimate power. Douglas described a society in which older men collectively controlled key resources, women, cult membership and knowledge of divination and sorcery. Younger men were dependent on these older men but in time took their places. The tensions between these groups were kept under control by potential and actual accusations of sorcery. Older men were careful not cause offence and avoid accusations of sorcery and younger men could use sorcery accusations to blame their older relatives for their misfortunes.

Douglas’s ethnography differed from conventional ethnographies. In particular it was written in the past tense. Conventionally ethnographies were written in the present tense; an attempt to record and preserve a reality that was destined to disappear. Douglas explicitly acknowledged and examined the ways in which colonial authorities were changing the Lele. For example she noted that Belgian colonial authorities had outlawed the poison ordeal. This was an important mechanism that limited the number of sorcery accusations as both the accuser and accused had to take the poison and one was expected to die; either the guilty sorcerer or the false accuser.

When Douglas returned to Kasai in the 1987 she found major changes in social and religious relationships. Many younger Lele had taken advantage of European education and had migrated to the capital, Kinshasa where they thrived as professionals, entrepreneurs or catholic priests. Those older people who remained in the villages and retained allegiances to traditional beliefs, were by the 1980s experiencing economic hardship. Younger urban Lele were adopting Christianity. This changed the nature of sorcery accusations which were increasingly used as a way for young Lele priests to attack and destroy traditional religion through the purging of older sorcerers and their sinful practices. There were public purges of sorcerers and ‘Those who were suspected of sorcery were beaten and burned until they confessed’.

=== Purity and Danger (1966) ===
Douglas' book Purity and Danger (first published 1966) is an analysis of the concepts of ritual purity and pollution in different societies and times to construct a general concept on how ritual purity is established, and is considered a key text in social anthropology. The text is renowned for its passionate defense of both ritual and purity during a time when the very concept of defilement was treated with disdain. Purity and Danger is most notable for demonstrating the comparative nature of her reflexions. In contrast to Claude Lévi-Strauss, who takes a structuralist approach, Douglas seeks to demonstrate how peoples' classifications play a role in determining what is considered abnormal and their treatment of it. Douglas insists on the importance of understanding the concept of pollution and ritual purity by comparing our own understandings and rituals to "primitive" rituals.

==== Purity in European and "primitive" societies ====
Douglas states that "primitive" societies are classified as those that do not recognize a distinction between being pure and being unclean. For western societies, there exists a clear distinction between what is dirty and what is considered holy. Therefore,

Sacred rules are thus merely rules hedging divinity off, and uncleanness is the two-way danger of contact with divinity.

For primitive societies, the ideas of taboo and holiness are personified by the notions of friendly or unfriendly deities; there exists a separation because objects, people, or places are associated with either good or bad deities. For this uncleanness to be transmitted, material contact must occur; being in physical contact with an object considered as unclean allows for the transmission of uncleanness to the body. A distinction to be made with Christianity, for example, would be that the uncleanness would pass not onto the body itself, but the spirit. Douglas emphasizes that in order to fully comprehend other societies understanding of taboo and sacred, one must first understand one's own.

==== The notion of "dirt" ====
Douglas dismantles a common euro-centric misconception that rituals and rites for cleanliness were devised with hygiene or sanitation as its goals. The avoidance of pork in Islam is often considered as having a hygienic basis, or that incense was used to mask body odors rather than symbolizing the ascending smoke of sacrifice. For Douglas, there exists a clear distinction between recognizing the side-benefits of ritual actions and considering them as a whole and sufficient explanation for ritual actions. Furthermore, Douglas recognized that there exists a strong resemblance between European rituals and primitive rituals in principle, omitting the differing foundations that separate European rituals based on hygiene and primitive ones on symbolism, European rituals of cleanness seek to kill off germs, whereas primitive rituals of cleanness seek to ward off spirits. However, Douglas states that it is not enough to limit the differentiation between European rituals and primitive ritual to simply hygienic benefits. She claims that the modern conception of dirt is synonymous with the knowledge of germs and bacteria;

It is difficult to think of dirt except in the context of pathogenicity.

If one removes the notions of bacteria and hygiene from the concept of dirt, all that remains is the symbolism of dirt;

The product of a systematic order and classification of matter.

==== Dirt as disorder in the symbolic structure ====
Douglas then proceeds to establish the notion that humans have a tendency to structure objects and situations around them into schema, well-organized systems. The older people become, the more confidence and experiences they establish into their structures. Ideally, the more consistent an experience is within a structure, the more confidence an individual will place on that experience. As a result, when an individual encounters facts or tendencies that disrupt the structure, they will largely ignore it. What is deemed impure are objects or phenomena that do not correspond with the pre-existing social or symbolic structure. Douglas associates dirt as a form of disruption to order, therefore it must be excluded in order to maintain the integrity of the system.

==== The Abomination of Leviticus ====
Mary Douglas is also known for her interpretation of the book of Leviticus, in the chapter The Abomination of Leviticus in Purity and Danger, in which she analyses the dietary laws of Leviticus II through a structuralist and symbolist point of view, and for her role in creating the Cultural Theory of risk. In The Abomination of Leviticus she states that the dietary laws were not based on medical materialism, but rather social boundaries, deeming that what is pure and impure is a way for a society to structure human experiences. At heart, what matters is using themes such as purity, separation and defilement to bring about order and structure to unorganized experiences. In Leviticus II, when categorizing which animals are authorized to be consumed, the pig is prohibited because while it has cloven feet like cows or goats, it does not produce milk, making it an anomaly within the structure of the world, hence its exclusion from the structure and its categorization as an impure animal.

=== Natural Symbols (1970) ===
In Natural Symbols (first published 1970), Douglas introduced the interrelated concepts of "group" (how clearly defined an individual's social position is as inside or outside a bounded social group) and "grid" (how clearly defined an individual's social role is within networks of social privileges, claims and obligations). The group-grid pattern was to be refined and redeployed in laying the foundations of Cultural Theory.

== Contributions to the study of misfortune, risk and blame ==
=== Blaming individuals for using supernatural power to cause misfortune: witchcraft and sorcery accusation ===
Douglas developed the insights of her Oxford supervisor, Evans-Pritchard. In his classic study of the ways in which the Azande responded to events that caused misfortune such as illness or death. Evans-Pritchard observed that while the Azande were aware of the technical causes of such events, they attributed the social consequences (the harm) to human agency in the form of witchcraft. Mary Douglas, in her fieldwork observed that the Lele blamed sorcerers for their misfortunes. Younger Lele men who had limited access to resources could counteract their dependence on the elders who controlled social, economic and political resources with accusations of sorcery. Thus younger men attributed their various misfortunes to their older relatives who were members of and had access to the knowledge of religious cults and the economic benefits of such membership.

In 1968, when Evans-Pritchard retired from the Chair of Social Anthropology at Oxford, the learned society which he founded in 1946, the Association of Social Anthropologists decided to hold a conference in his honour. Since it was just over 30 years since the publication of Evans-Pritchard's Witchcraft Among the Azande, the ASA invited Mary Douglas to organise a conference focusing on witchcraft. Douglas brought together anthropologists and historians who explored the ways in which accusations of the use of supernatural powers by individuals were used to explain misfortune and allocate blame in different part of the globe and in different historical periods.

=== Religion, sin and the allocation of blame ===
When Douglas revisited the Lele in the 1987 she observed important changes in the blaming system. Many younger Lele had taken advantage of colonial education and had migrated to the capital, Kinshasa where they thrived as professionals, entrepreneurs and Catholic priests. Older Lele, who remained in the villages, were by the 1980s experiencing economic hardship. While the older Lele retained allegiance to traditional beliefs and practices, younger Lele increasingly adopted Christianity. These changes led to a major change in blaming. Rather than being part of traditional religion and part of a balancing act between generations, sorcery accusation became a tool used by young Lele priests to attack and destroy traditional religion through purging the older sorcerers and their sinful practices.

Mary Douglas also used historical anthropology to explore the ways in which the concept of sin was used to explain misfortune and allocate blame. She examined the ways in which leprosy was linked to sin and used in 12th century Europe to allocate blame and protect from threats to the social order. The disease ‘was associated with sin, it was a chastisement by the hand of God’.

=== Modernity and risk: a new way of allocating blame ===
Douglas observed that in contemporary societies in the global North, risk has, for the most part, replaced witchcraft/sorcery and sin as the explanation for misfortune. Risk appears to be a very different sort of concept to witchcraft and sin, it is secular and based on rationality while both witchcraft and sin are grounded in the belief in supernatural powers. However, Douglas argues that they perform the same function, they explain and allocate responsibility for misfortune to human agents. In the case of sin, the sinful individual has failed to heed warnings about their sinful behaviour and there is divine retribution. In the case of risk, the accountable individual has failed to properly assess and mitigate the risk and should be publicly named and shamed for this failure.

While the concept of an accident, a random chance event, exists in contemporary society, there is strong pressure to ascribe all misfortune to human error, especially by those who have suffered its direct consequences. As the sociologist, Judith Green notes disasters and tragedies ‘are [by definition] the outcome of poorly managed risks, rather than the inevitable misfortunes that we all suffer from time-to-time’. This is perhaps most evident in public inquiries, state sanctioned investigations into existential misfortunes. Those individuals blamed in such Inquiries may see themselves as scapegoats sacrificed because they failed to prevent an event that they could not have predicted. Sharon Shoesmith, the former Islington Director of Education and Children’s Social Care, was sacked and blamed for the death of ‘Baby P’. In her account of events, Shoesmith argued that modern society’s inability to accept that some risks are unavoidable, and the fact that in the wake of a scandal a political and media feeding frenzy will not abate until someone is ‘named, blamed and shamed’, create huge challenges for those who work within particularly salient, sensitive and arguably invidious parts of the public sector.

== Collections ==
During her lifetime Douglas deposted her archive with Northwestern University, Evanston, Illinois. The collection includes biographical material in addition to research papers.

In 2007 University College London acquired an additional collection of Douglas' work, which spans 43 boxes, as a gift. The archive includes offprints, correspondence and working papers.

== Works ==
- Peoples of the Lake Nyasa Region (1950) as Mary Tew
- The Lele of the Kasai (1963)
- Purity and Danger: An Analysis of Concepts of Pollution and Taboo (1966)
- "Pollution", in International Encyclopedia of the Social Sciences, edited by David L. Sills and Robert K. Merton (New York, Macmillan Co. and the Free Press, 1968).
- Natural Symbols: Explorations in Cosmology (1970) (John Desmond Bernal Prize for 1995)
- Implicit Meanings: Essays in Anthropology (1975).
- The World of Goods: towards an anthropology of consumption (1979) with Baron Isherwood
- Evans-Pritchard (Fontana Modern Masters, 1980)
- Risk and Culture (1980) with Aaron Wildavsky
- In the Active Voice (1982)
- How Institutions Think (1986)
- Missing persons: a critique of the social sciences (1988) with Steven Ney
- Risk and Blame: Essays in Cultural Theory (London: Routledge, 1992).
- In the Wilderness: The Doctrine of Defilement in the Book of Numbers (1993)
- Thought styles: Critical essays on good taste (1996)
- Leviticus as Literature (1999)
- Jacob's Tears: The Priestly Work of Reconciliation (2004)
- Thinking in Circles (2007)

=== Editorial work ===
- Witchcraft Confessions and Accusations, ed. by M. Douglas (Tavistock, 1970).
- Rules and Meanings. The Anthropology of Everyday Knowledge: Selected Readings, ed. by M. Douglas (Penguin Books, 1973).
- Constructive Drinking: Perspectives on Drink from Anthropology, ed. by M. Douglas (1987)

== See also ==
- Risk perception
- Cultural Theory of risk
- Sacred contagion

== Sources ==
- Richard Fardon, Mary Douglas: an Intellectual Biography (1999)
- Richard Fardon (2020). « Mary Douglas, mémoire(s) d'un biographe », in BEROSE - International Encyclopaedia of the Histories of Anthropology, Paris.
- Richard Fardon (2020). « L'immortalité, déjà ? Ou la postérité de Mary Douglas », in BEROSE - International Encyclopaedia of the Histories of Anthropology, Paris.
