= Lucy Grace Allen =

American chef and author

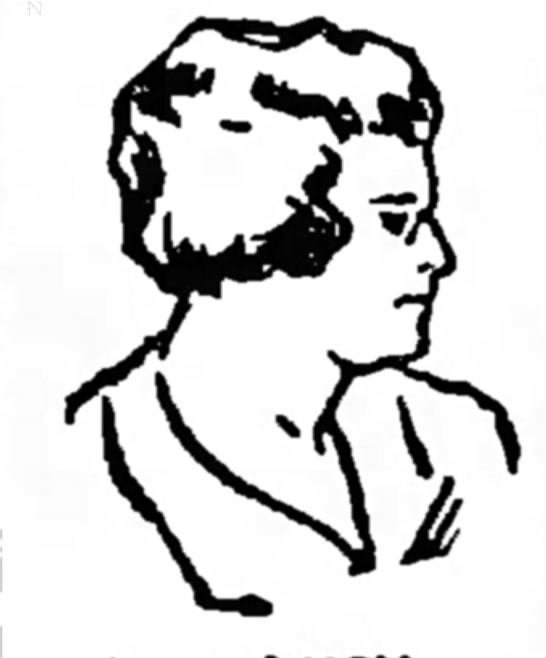
- Drawing of Allen in a Denton Journal article from 1926
- Born: 1867
- Died: May 10, 1966 (aged 98); Lakeville, Massachusetts, USA
- Education: Miss Farmer's School of Cookery
- Occupations: Cookery teacher, author

Lucy Grace Allen (1867 – May 10, 1966) was an American cookery teacher and author.

== Biography ==
Allen studied and then taught at Miss Farmer's School of Cookery (founded by Fannie Farmer) in Boston, Massachusetts. In 1915, together with Minnie S. Turner, Allen co-founded the Boston School of Cookery at 48a Gloucester Street, becoming the new school's director.

In 1926, she was described as having lived her whole life in New England.

An excerpt from her influential Table Service (first edition 1915), once described as "a clear, concise and yet comprehensive exposition of the waitress' duties", was printed in the anthropological anthology Rules and Meanings (1973).

Allen died in Lakeville on May 10, 1966, at the age of 98.

== Books ==
- Table Service. 1915.
- Choice Recipes for Clever Cooks. 1924.
- A Book of hors d'oeuvres. 1925.
- Choice Candy Recipes. 1930.
- Modern Menus and Recipes. 1935.
