= Natural Symbols =

Book by Mary Douglas

- US 1970 edition (publ. Pantheon Books)
- Author: Mary Douglas
- Original title: Natural Symbols: Explorations in Cosmology
- Language: English
- Subject: Cultural anthropology, Anthropology of religion
- Genre: Non-fiction
- Publisher: Barrie & Rockliff, Cresset Press
- Publication date: 1970
- Publication place: United Kingdom
- Media type: Print
- Pages: 177 pp.
- ISBN: 0-214-65075-8
- Preceded by: Purity and Danger
- Followed by: Rules and Meanings

Natural Symbols: Explorations in Cosmology (first published 1970) is an influential book by the British cultural anthropologist Mary Douglas. Further editions were published in 1973, 1982, 1996, 2003. It was also published in 2003 as volume 3 in Mary Douglas: Collected Works (ISBN 0415291062).

== Theoretical innovation ==
It was in Natural Symbols that Douglas introduced the "group-grid" theory, with "group" indicating how clearly defined an individual's social position is as inside or outside a bounded social group, and "grid" indicating how clearly defined an individual's social role is within networks of social privileges, claims, and obligations. The group–grid pattern was later to be refined and redeployed in laying the foundations of the cultural theory of risk.

== Reviews ==
Natural Symbols was reviewed by:

- K. O. L. Burridge in Man, New Series, 5:3 (1970), p. 530;
- David Martin in British Journal of Sociology, 21:3 (1970), pp. 343–344;
- David R. Bell in The Philosophical Quarterly, Vol. 22, No. 88 (1972), pp. 280–282;
- Shlomo Deshen in American Journal of Sociology, 77:1 (1971), pp. 163–166;
- Martin G. Silverman in American Anthropologist, New Series, 73:6 (1971), pp. 1293–1295;
- Anthony Storr, "The Ritual of Language and Vice Versa", in Chicago Tribune, June 28, 1970.

== Sources ==
- Albert James Bergesen, "Rituals, Symbols, and Society: Explicating the Mechanisms of the Moral Order", a review essay in American Journal of Sociology, 83:4 (1978), pp. 1012–1021 (also dealing with Mary Douglas's earlier work, Purity and Danger).
- Richard Fardon, Mary Douglas: An Intellectual Biography (London: Routledge, 1999), ch. 5.
