= Rules and Meanings =

1973 book edited by Mary Douglas

Rules and Meanings: The Anthropology of Everyday Knowledge. Selected Readings
- Paperback edition
- Author: Mary Douglas
- Language: English
- Subjects: Cultural anthropology, Sociology of knowledge
- Publisher: Penguin Books
- Publication date: 1973
- Publication place: United Kingdom
- Media type: Print
- Pages: 320 pp.
- ISBN: 0-415-29107-0
- Preceded by: Natural Symbols
- Followed by: Implicit Meanings

Rules and Meanings: The Anthropology of Everyday Knowledge. Selected Readings is an anthology of readings in cultural anthropology and the sociology of knowledge, edited by Mary Douglas and first published by Penguin Books in 1973 in their series Penguin Modern Sociology Readings. The background to the selection and the treatment of the 45 excerpts provided was a course on cognitive anthropology taught by Douglas at University College London. She not only selected the readings, but also provided a general introduction to the volume and a brief introduction to each of the eight sections. The theme running throughout is that "reality is socially constructed".

== Contents ==
A number of writers are represented by multiple excerpts in more than one section. Each is listed below only at first mention.

- Part One, "Tacit Conventions", contains excerpts from the writings of Ludwig Wittgenstein, Alfred Schütz, Harold Garfinkel and E. E. Evans-Pritchard.
- Part Two "The Logical Basis of Constructed Reality", provides selections from works by Émile Durkheim and Marcel Mauss, James C. Faris, Edmund Husserl, and Godfrey Lienhardt.
- Part Three, "Orientations in Time and Space", includes writing by Julius Alfred Roth, John Cage (from Silence: Lectures and Writings), M. L. J. Abercrombie, Lorna Marshall, Pierre Bourdieu and Peter Gidal.
- Part Four, "Physical Nature Assigned to Classes and Held to Them by Rules", opens with an excerpt from Mr Justice Ormrod's summing up in the case Corbett v Corbett, and further includes passages penned by Robert Hertz, Franz Steiner, Mrs Humphry, Stanley Jeyaraja Tambiah, and Ralph Bulmer.
- Part Five, "The Limits of Knowledge", again uses Wittgenstein and Husserl, as well as Basil Bernstein.
- Part Six, "Interpenetration of Meanings", provides an excerpt from D. R. Venables and R. E. Clifford, Academic Dress of the University of Oxford (1957), as well as from Tom Wolfe's The Electric Kool-Aid Acid Test (1968), from an anonymous 19th-century etiquette manual (1872), from Lucy Grace Allen's Table Service (1915), and from the 7th edition of Ceremonies of the Roman Rite Described (1943) by Adrian Fortescue and John Berthram O'Connell.
- Part Seven, "Provinces of Meaning", includes excerpts from C. W. M. Hart and Arnold R. Pilling's The Tiwi of North Australia, Hermann Hesse's The Glass Bead Game, and Leo Sherley-Price's translation of the Little Flowers of St. Francis.
- Part Eight, "Formal Correspondences", contains pieces written by S. M. Salim, Alan Segal, Roger Vailland, and M. A. K. Halliday.
