= Julius Alfred Roth =

American sociologist

Julius A. Roth (1924 – 2002) was Professor of Sociology at University of California, Davis. He is best known for his 1963 groundbreaking work in medical sociology, Timetables: Structuring the Passage of Time in Hospital Treatment and Other Careers, based in part on his own experience as a tuberculosis (TB) patient. Excerpts from Timetables were included in the Penguin Modern Sociology Readings anthology Rules and Meanings (1973).

Roth is sometimes associated with the so-called "Second" Chicago School of Sociology, although his University of Chicago degrees (M.A., 1950; Ph.D., 1954) were both awarded through the Committee on Human Development. Roth describes how his mentors Everett Hughes and David Riesman encouraged him to keep a journal during his TB hospitalizations, which eventually led to the publication of Timetables.
