= Sacred contagion =

Sacred contagion is the belief that spiritual properties within an object, place, or person may be passed to another object, place, or person, usually by direct contact or physical proximity. While the concept of sacred contagion has existed in numerous cultures since before recorded history, the term "sacred contagion" originated with French sociologist Émile Durkheim, who introduced it in his book, The Elementary Forms of Religious Life. For example, the Book of Leviticus, in Chapters 11 through 15, specifies which animals are considered spiritually clean and unclean, and defines women during menstruation and men after a nocturnal emission as unclean.

The text also gives many examples of sacred contagion brought about by contact with these spiritually unclean people and things. For example, chapter 15 states that spiritual uncleanliness exists not only in the menstruating woman but also the bed she sleeps in, as well as any object placed upon that bed, and any person who touches an object placed upon that bed. We see not only the passing of uncleanliness through spiritual contagion, but also that the uncleanliness may be further passed, from person to object and back to person indefinitely.

Anthropologist Mary Douglas, whose work is heavily influenced by Durkheim, wrote an extensive modern work on the topic of sacred contagion entitled Purity and Danger: An Analysis of the Concepts of Pollution and Taboo. She states that, "We cannot understand sacred contagion unless we distinguish a class of cultures in which pollution ideas flourish from another class of cultures, including our own, in which they do not." Douglas and Durkheim both rejected the idea that concepts of purity and impurity, such as those found in Leviticus, were an attempt to use religion to explain hygiene, an otherwise impossible task in the scientific terms of the time, several millennia before the concept of germs. Instead, according to Douglas and Durkheim, spiritual cleanliness and physical cleanliness are wholly separate and must be considered on their own terms.

== See also ==
- Contagion heuristic
- Law of contagion
- Ritual purification
- Social contagion
- Tzaraath
