= Narrative bias =

Bias towards individual narratives

Narrative bias, also known as narrative information bias, is a cognitive bias that skews perceptions towards information contained in individual narratives, as compared to complex data or other forms of information.

It refers both to the tendency to trust anecdotes over other forms of information, as well as a form of illusory correlation that connects unrelated variables into a cohesive narrative.

== Origins ==
Michelle Scalise Sugiyama, an evolutionary psychologist and anthropologist, examined the possible origins of storytelling. In her 1996 paper, On the Origins of Narrative: Storyteller Bias as a Fitness-Enhancing Strategy, she proposed that humans might be predisposed to narrative bias. Sugiyama argues that storytelling could have enhanced fitness by strengthening group cohesion, facilitating the exchange of information and social learning, and increasing storyteller’s prestige.

Sugiyama argues that the storyteller bias, sometimes referred to as narrative bias, arises because individuals have different priorities based on factors such as sex, age, reproductive interests, social status, and social roles. These differing interests may influence how stories are told. Storytellers can selectively emphasize, frame, or distort details in ways that support their own perspectives or goals. Evidence to back this up includes folklore and ethnographic records showing that different tellers within the same culture may recount the same story with variation, suggesting that narrative delivery can be strategic. Historical uses of storytelling in propaganda, rumor-spreading, and political persuasion also illustrate that narratives have been used for a long time to influence beliefs and behaviors.

Proposed functions of storytelling include:

- Information transmission: Stories allow individuals to share knowledge about the physical environment, social norms and rules, and potential dangers. By transmitting experience through word of mouth, storytelling enables learning without direct exposure to risks, and allows information to be preserved across generations.
- Social coordination and norm enforcement: Narratives communicate moral lessons, social rules, and culturally important norms. By framing positive and negative behavior through stories, people can promote cooperation, and maintain social cohesion.
- Social status maintenance: Skilled storytellers could gain and maintain social recognition by engaging audiences, demonstrating intelligence, or providing valuable information. This can lead to greater influence within the group and reproductive advantages, potentially making storytelling a fitness enhancing trait.

Overall, Sugiyama concludes that narratives are not neutral recounting of events. They reflect the motives and interests of the storyteller, forming a theoretical basis for narrative bias.

== Empirical study on narrative bias ==
"The narrative bias revisited: What drives the biasing influence of narrative information on risk perceptions?" is an empirical study on narrative bias by Betsch and colleagues (2015). The authors conducted an experimental study to examine why narrative information, such as personal accounts, influences risk perception more strongly than statistical data. They found that narrative stories increased perceived risk even when they directly contradicted statistical evidence. This effect persisted even when participants were told about potential bias, indicating that people often attribute more weight to personal stories than statistical information. The authors suggested that narratives are more persuasive than numerical data due to emotional engagement and imagery.

== See also ==
- Illusory correlation
- List of cognitive biases
