= Cultural theory of risk =

Aspect of sociology

The cultural theory of risk, often referred to simply as "Cultural Theory" (with capital letters; not to be confused with culture theory), consists of a conceptual framework and an associated body of empirical studies that seek to explain societal conflict over risk. Whereas other theories of risk perception stress economic and cognitive influences, Cultural Theory asserts that structures of social organization endow individuals with perceptions that reinforce those structures in competition against alternative ones. This theory was first elaborated in the book Natural Symbols, written by anthropologist Mary Douglas in 1970. Douglas later worked closely with the political scientist Aaron Wildavsky, to clarify the theory. Cultural Theory has given rise to a diverse set of research programs that span multiple social science disciplines and that have in recent years, been used to analyze policymaking conflicts in general.

== Theory and evidence ==
=== Risk and blame, group and grid ===
Two features of anthropologist Mary Douglas's work inform the basic structure of "Cultural Theory". The first of these are a general account of the social function of cases of individual perceptions of societal dangers. Individuals, Douglas maintained, tend to associate societal harms—from sickness to famine to natural catastrophes—with conducts that transgresses societal norms. This tendency, she argued, plays an indispensable role in promoting certain social structures, both by imbuing a society's members with aversions to subversive behavior and by focusing resentment and blame on those who defy such institutions.

The second important feature of Douglas's work is a particular account of the forms that competing structures of social organization assume. Douglas maintained that cultural ways of life and affiliated outlooks can be characterized (within and across all societies at all times) along two dimensions, which she called "group" and "grid". A "high group" way of life exhibits a high degree of collective control, whereas a "low group" one exhibits a much lower one and a resulting emphasis on individual self-sufficiency. A "high grid" way of life is characterized by conspicuous and durable forms of stratification in roles and authority, whereas a "low grid" one reflects a more egalitarian ordering.

Although developed in Douglas's earlier work, these two strands of her thought were first consciously woven together to form the fabric of a theory of risk perception in her and Wildavsky's 1982 book, Risk and Culture: An Essay on the Selection of Technical and Environmental Dangers. Focusing largely on political conflict over air pollution and nuclear power in the United States, Risk and Culture attributed political conflict over environmental and technological risks to a struggle between adherents of competing ways of life associated with the group–grid scheme: an egalitarian, collectivist ("low grid", "high group") one, which gravitates toward fear of environmental disaster as a justification for restricting commercial behavior productive of inequality; and individualistic ("low group") and hierarchical ("high grid") ones, which resist claims of environmental risk in order to shield private orderings from interference, and to defend established commercial and governmental elites from subversive rebuke.

Later works in Cultural Theory systematized this argument. In these accounts, group–grid gives rise to either four or five discrete ways of life, each of which is associated with a view of nature (as robust, as fragile, as capricious, and so forth) that is congenial to its advancement in competition with the others.

=== Survey studies ===
A variety of scholars have presented survey data in support of Cultural Theory. The first of these was Karl Dake, a graduate student of Wildavsky, who correlated perceptions of various societal risks—environmental disaster, external aggression, internal disorder, market breakdown—with subjects' scores on attitudinal scales that he believed reflected the "cultural worldviews" associated with the ways of life in Douglas's group–grid scheme. Later researchers have refined Dake's measures and have applied them to a wide variety of environmental and technological risks. Such studies furnish an indirect form of proof by showing that risk perceptions are distributed across persons in patterns better explained by culture than by other asserted influences.

=== Case studies ===
Other scholars have presented more interpretive empirical support for Cultural Theory. Developed in case-study form, their work shows how particular risk-regulation and related controversies can plausibly be understood within a group-grid framework.

== Relationship to other risk perception theories ==
Cultural Theory is an alternative to two other prominent theories of risk perception. The first, which is grounded in rational choice theory, treats risk perceptions as manifesting individuals' implicit weighing of costs and benefits. Douglas and Wildavsky criticized this position in Risk and Culture, arguing that it ignores the role of cultural ways of life in determining what states of affairs individuals see as worthy of taking risks to attain. The second prominent theory, which is grounded in social psychology and behavioral economics, asserts that individuals' risk perceptions are pervasively shaped, and often distorted by heuristics and biases. Douglas maintained that this "psychometric" approach naively attempted to "depoliticize" risk conflicts by attributing to cognitive influences beliefs that reflect individuals' commitments to competing cultural structures.

Some scholars, including Paul Slovic, a pioneer in the development of the psychometric theory, and Dan Kahan have sought to connect the psychometric and cultural theories. This position, known as the cultural cognition of risk, asserts that the dynamics featured in the psychometric paradigm are the mechanisms through which group-grid worldviews shape risk perception. Considering such a program, Douglas herself thought it unworkable, saying that "[i]f we were invited to make a coalition between group-grid theory and psychometrics, it would be like going to heaven". Such deeply ironic statements are scattered through her work as indicating an unattainable mirage of 'positionlessness': understanding and knowledge must, for Douglas, always emerge from a particular, partial, position, as is evident from the opening chapters of her 1982 book with Wildavsky.

== Application beyond risk perception ==
Theorists working with Cultural Theory have adapted its basic components, and in particular the group-grid typology, to matters in addition to risk perception. These include political science, public policy, public management and organizational studies, law, and sustainability.

== Criticism ==
The Cultural Theory of risk has been subject to a variety of criticisms. Complexities and ambiguities inherent in Douglas's group-grid scheme, and the resulting diversity of conceptualizations among cultural theorists, lead Åsa Boholm to believe the theory is fatally opaque. She also objects to the theory's embrace of functionalism, a controversial mode of analysis that sees the needs of collective entities (in the case of Cultural Theory, the ways of life defined by group-grid), rather than the decisions of individuals about how to pursue their own ends, as the principal causal force in social relations. Furthermore, both Boholm and van der Linden (2015) note that cultural theory is circular in its logic. Commentators have also critiqued studies that purport to furnish empirical evidence for Cultural Theory, particularly survey studies, which some argue reflect unreliable measures of individual attitudes and in any case explain only a modest amount of the variance in individual perceptions of risk. Finally, some resist Cultural Theory on political grounds owing to Douglas and Wildavsky's harsh denunciation of environmentalists in Risk and Culture.

== See also ==
- Tightness–looseness theory
