= Dan Kahan =

American law professor

Dan M. Kahan
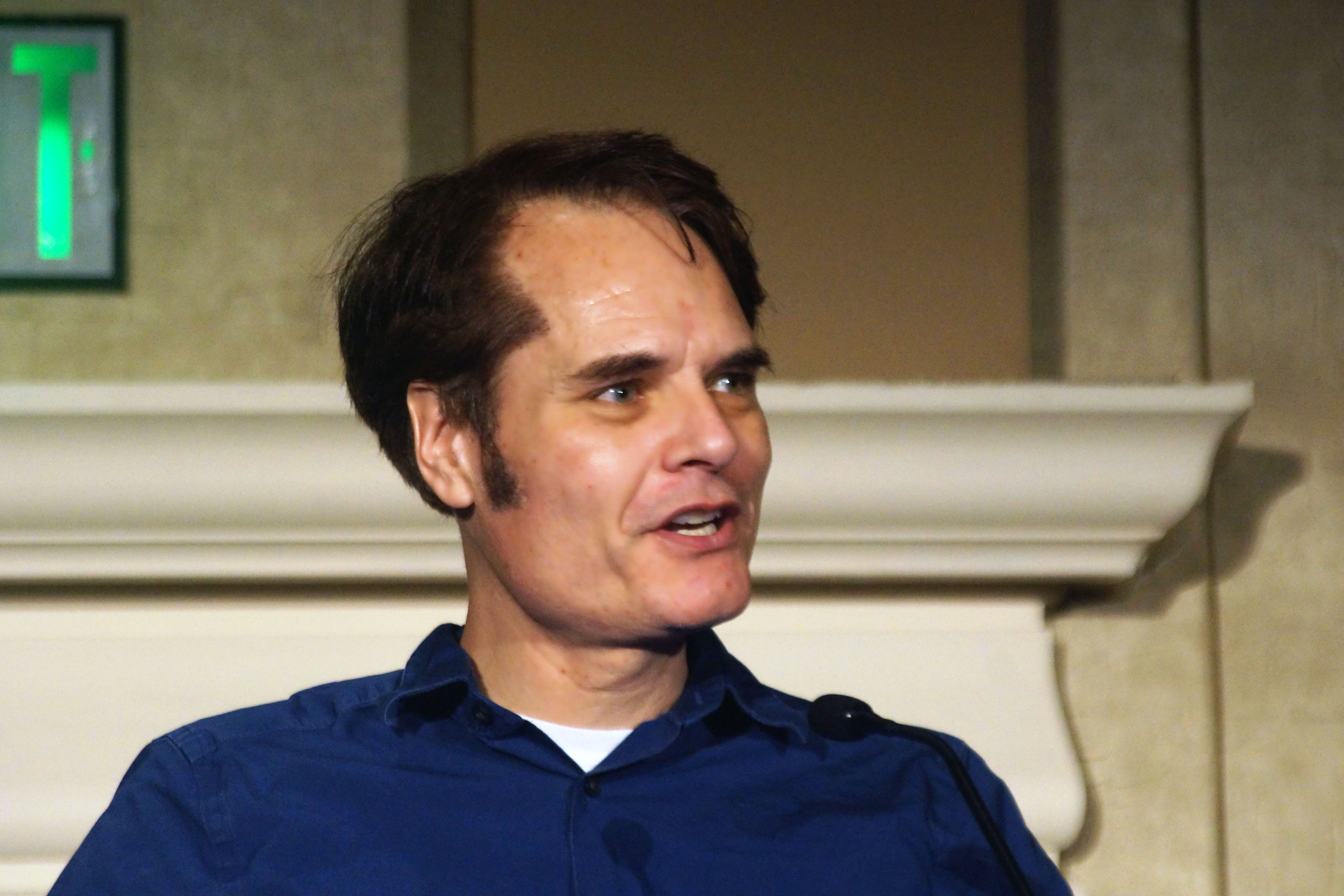
- On the Science and Public Policy Panel at CSICon Nashville, October 27, 2012
- Known for: Cultural cognition
- Scientific career
- Fields: Professor of Law
- Institutions: Elizabeth K. Dollard Professor at Yale Law School

Dan M. Kahan is the Elizabeth K. Dollard Professor of Law at Yale Law School. His professional expertise is in the fields of criminal law and evidence, and he is known for his theory of cultural cognition.

== Education ==
After attending a boarding school in Vermont, Kahan received a BA summa cum laude from Middlebury College in 1986, where he studied under Murray Dry. While at Middlebury, he spent his junior year at Lincoln College, Oxford. He then received a JD magna cum laude from Harvard Law School in 1989, where he learned Tort Law from Lewis Sargentich and Criminal Law from Charles Ogletree. While at Harvard Law School, he served as president of the Harvard Law Review for volume 102.

== Career ==
After law school, Kahan served as a law clerk to Judge Harry T. Edwards of the United States Court of Appeals for the D.C. Circuit (1989–90) and then to Justice Thurgood Marshall of the U.S. Supreme Court (1990–91). After clerking, he worked as an attorney for Mayer, Brown & Platt in Washington D.C. (1991–93). In 1993, Kahan joined the faculty of the University of Chicago Law School where he worked with Elena Kagan. He joined the Yale Law School faculty in 1999. At Yale, he is one of the instructors in the Law School's Supreme Court Advocacy Clinic and a professor of Criminal Law and Administration. He is a recurring visiting professor at Harvard Law School.

== Legal theory ==
He accepts the central tenets of legal realism. As developed at Yale Law School in the 1920s and 1930s, legal realism was less interested in demonstrating that legal rules are formally indeterminate than to explain how lawyers nonetheless form such uniform and predictable understandings of what those rules entail. Karl Llewellyn attributed this ability to what he called "situation sense", an intuitive perceptive faculty borne of immersion in professional and cultural norms.

Kahan argues that when lawyers exercise professional judgment, and perform their professional responsibilities, they affirm the authority and extend the vitality of the norms that construct society's professional situation sense. However, law is not merely a set of rigid rules robotically applied. There is a complex, additional element of moral agency. The content of the lawyers' situation sense is inevitably contingent and dynamic: professional norms – and in turn the law itself – evolve in response to the evaluations lawyers make of the decisions and actions of each other. The only test of whether some lawyer has reliable situation sense is to see whether other lawyers (including decisionmakers) agree with that lawyer's perceptions of how society's rules should be applied.

== The Cultural Cognition Project ==
Kahan is best known for his work on the cultural theory of risk. This research delves into cultural cognition, which is the study of how individuals form beliefs about the amount of risk in certain situations based on their preconceived cultural group identities. Most of this work is supported by empirical and statistical analyses of group responses to pre-created hypotheticals.

Project members use the methods of various disciplines—including social psychology, anthropology, communications, and political science—to chart the impact of this phenomenon and to identify the mechanisms through which it operates. The Project also has an explicit normative objective: to identify processes of democratic decisionmaking by which society can resolve culturally grounded differences in belief in a manner that is both congenial to persons of diverse cultural outlooks and consistent with sound public policymaking.

== Selected works ==
=== Shaming Sanctions ===
Kahan’s attitude towards shaming sanctions has changed from positive to negative over time. Kahan initially believed that shaming penalties were on the rise in American law and were an effective alternative to traditional punishments. This was, he argued, especially feasible and valuable for federal white collar offenders. He believed the efficiency of such penalties was affected by their power to express publicly valued social meanings. Thus, he developed a theoretical model that connected the deterrent efficacy of such penalties to their power to signal the undesirable propensities of wrongdoers and the desirable propensities of citizens who shun wrongdoers.

Kahan argued that American jurisdictions had traditionally resisted fines and community service as alternatives to imprisonment, notwithstanding strong support for these sanctions among academics and reformers. Why? The answer was that these forms of punishment were expressively inferior to incarceration. According to this view, the public expects punishment not only to deter crime and to impose deserved suffering, but also to make accurate statements about what the community values. Imprisonment has been and continues to be Americans' punishment of choice for serious offenses because of the resonance of liberty deprivation as a symbol of condemnation in American culture. By contrast, fines and community service either failed to express condemnation as unambiguously as imprisonment, or expressed other valuations that Americans rejected as false.

He also used expressive theory to explain why the American public had consistently rejected proposals to restore corporal punishment, a form of discipline that offended egalitarian moral sensibilities; and why the public was growing increasingly receptive to shaming punishments, which unlike conventional alternative sanctions could signal condemnation unambiguously.

In a later article entitled "What's Really Wrong with Shaming Sanctions" he stated that he now repudiated the premise of his earlier analysis: "Drawing on work that I’ve done since then, I now acknowledge that the premise of this analysis was flawed. Ordinary citizens expect punishments not merely to condemn but to do so in ways that affirm rather than denigrate their core values. By ritualistically stigmatizing wrongdoers as transgressors of shared moral norms, shaming penalties grate against the sensibilities of persons who subscribe to egalitarian and individualistic worldviews."

Kahan garnered national attention for his research. He has been cited on NBC News' Today Show and in such publications as the New York Times and the Wall Street Journal for his views on alternative sanctions.

=== Gentle Nudges vs. Hard Shoves ===
The resistance of law enforcers sometimes confounds the efforts of lawmakers to change social norms. Thus, as legislators expand liability for date rape, domestic violence, and drunk driving, police become less likely to arrest, prosecutors to charge, jurors to convict, and judges to sentence severely. The conspicuous resistance of these decisionmakers in turn reinforces the norms that lawmakers intended to change. Can this "sticky norms" pathology be effectively treated? It can be, if lawmakers apply "gentle nudges" rather than "hard shoves". When the law embodies a relatively mild degree of condemnation, the desire of most decisionmakers to discharge their civic duties will override their reluctance to enforce a law that attacks a widespread social norm. The willingness of most decisionmakers to enforce can initiate a self-reinforcing wave of condemnation, thereby allowing lawmakers to increase the severity of the law in the future without prompting resistance from most decisionmakers. Kahan presents a formal model of this strategy for norm reform, illustrates it with real-world examples, and identifies its normative and prescriptive implications.

=== The Secret Ambition of Deterrence ===
Kahan identifies the political and moral economies of deterrence theory in legal discourse. Drawing on an extensive social science literature, he shows that deterrence arguments in fact have little impact on citizens' views on controversial policies such as capital punishment, gun control, and hate crime laws. Citizens conventionally defend their positions in deterrence terms nonetheless only because the alternative is a highly contentious expressive idiom, which social norms, strategic calculation, and liberal morality all condemn. But not all citizens respond to these forces. Expressive zealots have an incentive to frame controversial issues in culturally partisan terms, thereby forcing moderate citizens to defect from the deterrence détente and declare their cultural allegiances as well. Accordingly, deliberations permanently cycle between the disengaged, face-saving idiom of deterrence and the partisan, face-breaking idiom of expressive condemnation. These dynamics complicate the normative assessment of deterrence. By abstracting from contentious expressive judgments, deterrence arguments serve the ends of liberal public reason, which enjoins citizens to advance arguments accessible to individuals of diverse moral persuasions. But precisely because deterrence arguments denude the law of social meaning, the prominence of the deterrence idiom impedes progressives from harnessing the expressive power of the law to challenge unjust social norms. There is no stable discourse equilibrium between the deterrence and expressive idioms, either as a positive matter or a normative one.

=== Cultural Cognition ===
Cultural Cognition: "Blunders" or "Values"?, 119 Harv. L. Rev. F. 166 (2006)(with Paul Slovic)

Cultural Cognition and Public Policy, 24 Yale L. & Pol'y Rev. 149 (2006) (with Donald Braman)

=== Miscellaneous Works ===
Fear of Democracy: A Cultural Evaluation of Sunstein on Risk, 119 Harv. L. Rev. 1071 (2006) (with Paul Slovic, Donald Braman & John Gastil)

Modeling Facts, Culture and Cognition in the Gun Debate, 18 Social Justice Res.203 (2005) (with Donald Braman & James Grimmelman)

== See also ==
- List of law clerks for the tenth seat of the Supreme Court of the United States
