= How Institutions Think =

1986 book by Mary Douglas

- Author: Mary Douglas
- Subject: Cultural anthropology
- Publisher: Syracuse University Press
- Publication date: 1986
- ISBN: 0-8156-2369-0
- Preceded by: In the Active Voice (1982)
- Followed by: Constructive Drinking (1987)

How Institutions Think (first published 1986) is the best-known book from cultural anthropologist Mary Douglas . (Not to be confused by the 2017 anthology of the same name). The book is considered a classic in the field and continues to be studied and cited in anthropology and organizational theory.

== Summary ==
This is the published version of the Frank W. Abrams Lectures delivered by Douglas at Syracuse University in March 1985. Douglas offers a critique of the rational choice theory, rooted in social anthropology and a structural functionalist approach. She builds on the work of Émile Durkheim and Ludwig Fleck to explain how humans cooperate and the role of institutions (in the sociological sense) in shaping ways of thinking.

She argues that rational choice theory cannot explain certain empirically observed phenomena, such as self-sacrifice or non-authoritarian, 'latent', groups. The book discusses alternative explanations, such as the building of analogies to support common understandings from early human communities.
