= Philip Gulliver =

Canadian anthropologist and academic (1921–2018)

Philip Hugh Gulliver (2 September 1921 – 30 March 2018) was a Canadian anthropologist specifically in Oriental and African Studies, a Distinguished Professor Emeritus at York University and also a Fellow of the Royal Society of Canada.
