= Paul Slovic =

American professor of psychology (b.1938)

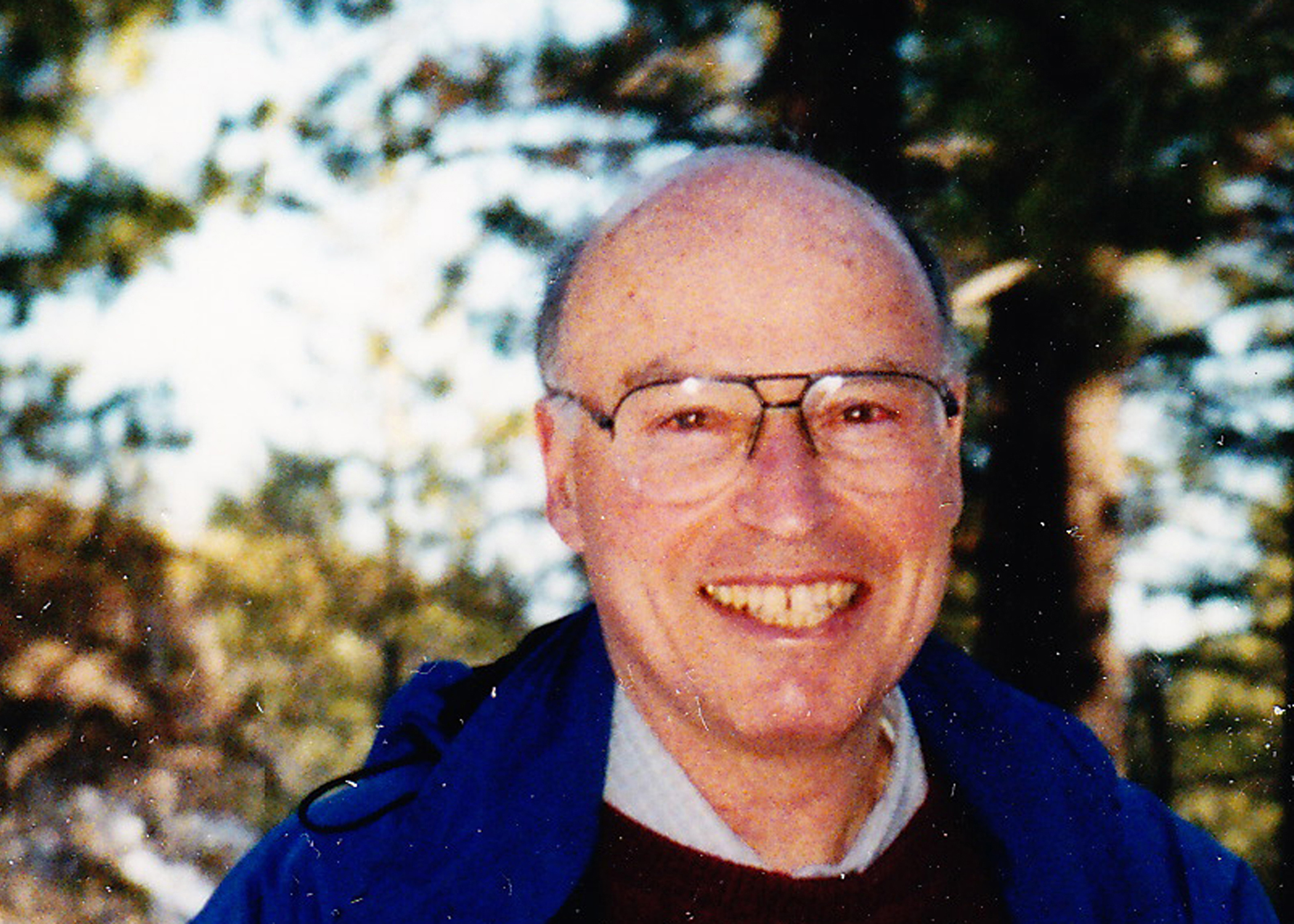
- Education: Stanford University; University of Michigan
- Known for: Risk perception Behavioural sciences Risk analysis Communication sciences
- Awards: Bower Award (2022)
- Scientific career
- Fields: Decision Sciences, Risk
- Workplaces: University of Oregon; University of Padova; Hebrew University; American Academy of Arts and Sciences

Paul Slovic (born 1938) is an American Emeritus professor of psychology at the University of Oregon and the president of Decision Research, a collection of scientists from all over the nation and in other countries that study decision-making in times when risks are involved. He was also the president for the Society of Risk Analysis until 1984. He earned his undergraduate degree at Stanford University in 1959 and his PhD in psychology at the University of Michigan in 1964 and has received honorary doctorates from the Stockholm School of Economics and the University of East Anglia. He is past president of the Society for Risk Analysis and in 1991 received its Distinguished Contribution Award. In 1993, he received the Distinguished Scientific Contribution Award from the American Psychological Association, and in 1995 he received the Outstanding Contribution to Science Award from the Oregon Academy of Science. In 2016 he was elected to the National Academy of Sciences.

Slovic studies human judgment, decision making, and risk perception, and has published extensively on these topics. He is considered, with Baruch Fischhoff and Sarah Lichtenstein, a leading theorist and researcher in the risk perception field (the psychometric paradigm, the affect heuristic, and "risk as feeling").

His most recent work examines “psychic numbing” and the failure to respond to mass human tragedies.

== Major theories ==
Affect Heuristic - this is the ability to make a quick emotional decision in time of crisis. Slovic says that even if there is a bad situation, if we have positive feelings toward something it lowers people's perception of risks but enhances their perception of benefits.

Slovic contributed towards the psychometric paradigm of risk perception. He found that people usually perceived most activities as having a high risk. He also found that if someone gained pleasure from something they saw the risk level being low. This shows that risk levels can depend on the individual's personal belief and emotions of a specific risk.

Psychophysical Numbing - this is the idea that people are not as affected by the loss of life depending on how it is presented. Slovic says that people cannot connect on an emotional level when being presented with large numbers.

== Publications ==
In "Perception of Risk Posed by Extreme Events", Slovic discusses what research says about people's perceived risk when associated with extreme events. The way people think action should take place is based on their perceptions. These perceptions can vary from people's status, background, education, biology, etc. The different perceptions decide how risky a choice of action is in extreme events over another. Risk perceptions are connected between emotions and reason, which creates rational behavior. Slovic explains what risk actually is. He says it is a hazard, probability, it has consequences, and threat. Since it has so many subjective meanings tied to it, it often causes communication failure. Risk perceptions are studied in three major ways: axiomatic measurement paradigm, socio-cultural paradigm, and psychometric paradigm. The axiomatic measurement looks at how people view consequences of a risky choice and how it might impact their lives. The Socio-cultural looks at the “effect of group and culture level variable on risk perception”. Psychometric paradigm looks at how people react emotionally to a risky situation that “affects judgments of the riskiness of physical, environmental and material risk”. When public officials overreact to a new/unknown danger it is likely because they overestimate its true danger or for reassurance for the public.

“If I Look at the Mass I will Never Act” discusses how most people are caring individuals and they are willing to help those in need. The problem is when those in need are part of a mass group of people. The question that Slovic asks is why do people ignore genocide? He uses psychological research to show how mass murders do not connect in people's minds as being bad as they are. He discusses the lessons that is learned from past genocide. He talks about how we said “’Never again’ after liberation of Nazi death camps” but we have continued to have instances of genocide all over the world. America has reacted poorly to genocide. There are no ramifications to political figures if they choose to stay out of the conflict. He also looks at how the media does not do a great job of reporting the news. They are focused on other issues that are emphasizing the bigger problems. When discussing his psychological research he says how all other factors do not matter without “affect”. Affect is what tells us if something is right or wrong. “If activated feelings are pleasant, they motivate actions to reproduce the feelings. If the feelings are unpleasant, they motivate actions and thoughts anticipated to avoid the feelings” The experience of affect is what guides peoples “judgments, decisions and actions” Slovic also discusses “Attention” as being an important factor. It is necessary for the feelings. It is good for people to see the vast numbers of those murdered but it does not have the same effect as images. Slovic says, “We quickly grow numb to the facts and the math” He uses statistics to show the relationship between the numbers of people presented and our level of contributions to help them. When it was one victim it was a full ten on the scale. For eight victims the contribution dropped down to a five. What seemed to work was when the media would cover individual stories of victims. People became more willing to the help/donate in these instances. Several changes need to be made to combat this perception of mass murder. International law needs to be changed to accommodate this problem of numbness of numbers. The approach of reporting genocide also needs to change because our feelings alone do not give enough drive to stop genocide.

"Facts and Fears: Societal Perception of Risk": There is statistical data for many hazards that people can perceive such as smoking, car wrecks, etc. But without interpretation of the statistics they are just numbers and they have to be given relevance in their respective context. Slovic looks at the psychology of risk assessment when managing hazards. He says that experts as general publics are needed in the assessment process and “that understanding public perceptions is crucial to effective decision making”. Through his study he looked at how people view as a perceived risk and what determines risk perception. By the end of his research he concluded that “perceived risk is quantifiable and predictable”. Not only is there a difference in perception between experts and public but also the people within the public differ as well. He found that when there is a higher perceived risk it causes higher desired reduction of that risk.
