= Lele people =

Ethnic group in Western Democratic Republic of the Congo

The Lele (or Leele), also known as Bashilele or Usilele, are a Bantu ethnic group closely related to the Kuba people in the Democratic Republic of the Congo. They traditionally live in the Kasai River region, but since the 1950s many have migrated to Kinshasa. There are currently about 30,000 Lele, of whom 26,000 speak the Lele language.
