= A Diary in the Strict Sense of the Term =

Diary collection of Bronisław Malinowski

- Author: Bronislaw Malinowski
- Publication date: 1967

A Diary in the Strict Sense of the Term is a collection of the private diaries of the prominent anthropologist Bronisław Malinowski during his fieldwork in New Guinea and the Trobriand Islands between 1914–1915 and 1917–1918. The collection is composed of two diaries, written in Polish.

Published posthumously by his widow Valetta Swann in 1967, the diaries, which repeatedly touch upon intensely personal matters such as sexual desires, as well as his private prejudices against his interlocutors, have remained extremely controversial. The introduction of the book was written by his pupil Raymond Firth.

== History and significance ==
When the diaries were published in 1967, Clifford Geertz called them "gross" and "tiresome", and wrote that they portrayed Malinowski as "a crabbed, self-preoccupied, hypochondriacal narcissist, whose fellow-feeling for the people he lived with was limited in the extreme." Two decades later, however, he praised the collection as a "backstage masterpiece of anthropology, our The Double Helix".

Michael W. Young noted that the diaries, "scandalously frank" with regards to topic such as the author's sexual desires and encounters, "debunked the romantic myth that he enjoyed relaxed and friendly rapport with his subjects and it fueled a moral crisis of the discipline in the 1970s." Some parts of the diaries have been described as "racist" and "abusive" towards the natives, although they have been also defended as reflecting his "a bit grouchy" attitude.

There is much debate about Malinowski's use of racial slurs to refer to his indigenous interlocutors, which is addressed in the introduction of the second edition of the diaries, Second Introduction 1988, written by Raymond Firth. Malinowski's personal diaries were written in his native Polish, and Firth discusses the translation decision of translating nigrami as "niggers" instead of "the blacks", and "thus positioning Malinowski into a racist category", as this term is used over 20 times in the diary entries. The published diary entries also drew attention due to Malinowski's homosexual dreams, his complaints and transgressions towards his fiancée, referred to as E.R.M., as well as references of "violent surges of sexual instinct for native girls". Though Malinowski maintains in the diaries that he "did not succumb to temptations and mastered them, every one of them in the last instance."

In 1985, Malinowski's daughter, Helena Wayne, noted that the diaries were "very personal [and] not meant for other eyes", and that she would have preferred if they remained out of print, instead available only as raw materials for a biographer. She acknowledged, however, that many scholars found the diaries very useful for insights on Malinowski and his work.

Writing in 1987, James Clifford called the diaries "a crucial document for the history of anthropology".

In 2018, William W. Kelly wrote that "debate continues on whether the Diary directly reflects (and discredits) his fieldwork or whether it was an anguished outpouring of psychological anxieties that had more to do with his family, potential fiancées, and career than with anything going on outside his tent on the Trobriands".
