= T. V. Reed =

American historian

T. V. Reed is the Buchanan Distinguished Professor Emeritus of American Studies and English at Washington State University and also a published author, largely collected in libraries.

Reed grew up in the San Francisco Bay Area, did undergraduate work and Master's work in the Northwest, and received his PhD at the History of Consciousness Program at the University of California, Santa Cruz. There he took graduate seminars from Michel Foucault, Donna Haraway, James Clifford, Gayatri Spivak, Edward Said, Fredric Jameson, Henri Lefebvre, and Hayden White, among others. Reed found that in addition to “instilling some particular theoretical approaches, taught him two important lessons: (1) even the most celebrated theorists are just flawed human beings with embodied intellectual limits like the rest of us; and (2) the best theorists do not fetishize their own theories but are rather in a constant state of evolution and self-questioning.”

Reed was the author/manager of the website Cultural Politics.

== Books ==
Reed has five published books:

- Fifteen Jugglers, Five Believers: Literary Politics and the Poetics of American Social Movements (University of California Press, 1992)
- The Art of Protest: Culture and Activism from the Civil Rights Movement to the Streets of Seattle (University of Minnesota Press, 2005; revised 2019)
- Robert Cantwell and the Literary Left: A Northwest Writer Reworks American Fiction (University of Washington Press, 2014)
- Digitized Lives: Culture, Power and Social Change in the Internet Era (Routledge, 2014; revised edition 2019)
- The Bloomsbury Introduction to Postmodern Realist Fiction was published in 2021.

== Essays ==
Reed has published essays dealing with additional dimensions of US political cultures, including the cultures of academe and academic theory in a variety of venues such as Representations, American Literary History, The Encyclopedia of American Studies and American Studies International. His articles on the politically innovative narrative strategies of James Agee and E.L. Doctorow have appeared in Representations and American Literary History, respectively. He is the author of the bibliographic essay, "Theory and Method in American Cultural Studies," appearing originally in American Studies International, and now also available in a much-expanded online version at his web matrix, Cultural Politics.

Reed has published articles on apartheid and popular music, on Native radicals in film, on environmental justice ecocriticism, and in the area of interdisciplinary peace studies, among other topics. Reed's interest in institutional-theoretical questions of interdisciplinarity is reflected in a piece published in the anthology, Color-Lines to Border Lands, that examines a phenomenon he calls “the intersection of interdisciplines.” The essay theorizes and historicizes interrelations among the fields of ethnic studies, women's studies, queer studies, postcolonial studies and American studies, and relates them to shifting social movement landscapes.

== Awards ==
Among other honors, Reed has been a Fulbright Senior Lecturer at the JFK Institute for North American Studies in Berlin, Germany, a Mellon Fellow at Wesleyan University, a visiting scholar at the Center for Cultural Studies of the University of California, Santa Cruz, and distinguished visiting scholar and keynote speaker for the University of Kansas Institute for Rethinking Literature. In 2013, he was awarded the American Studies Association's Mary C. Turpie Award for “outstanding teaching, advising and program development”. Reed was visiting professor of English and humanities at York University, Toronto, from 2013 to 2017.

== Additional activities ==
Reed was co-chair of the national American Studies Association's conference for 2002, has been a member of the ASA's national council and was one of two nominees for the organization's presidency in 2011. In 2011, Reed received the Mary C. Turpie award of the American Studies Association for "outstanding achievement in American studies teaching, advising and program development.
