= Freedom & Civilization =

1944 book by Bronisław Malinowski

- Author: Bronisław Malinowski
- Language: English
- Subject: Freedom
- Publisher: Roy Publishers
- Publication date: 1944
- Media type: Print
- Pages: 338
- OCLC: 973861

Freedom & Civilization or Freedom and Civilization is a 1944 book by the Polish scholar Bronisław Malinowski. It was based on Malinowski's lectures from his time at Yale University, and published posthumously by Roy Publishers, two years after Malinowski's death.

I... believe that without freedom and democracy, civilization cannot survive.

— Bronisław Malinowski, 1944

== Development ==
The book has been written during Malinowski's sabbatical in the United States, which became interrupted by the outbreak of World War II. He became an outspoken critic of Nazi Germany, arguing that it posed to a threat to civilization, and he repeatedly urged American citizens to abandon their neutrality; as a result, his books became banned in Germany.

== Content ==
Freedom & Civilization consists of his lectures, given to American listeners at Yale University, on the topics of freedom, collected and edited by his wife Valetta Swann.

Antonia Wenkart summarized the book in a 1945 review for the American Journal of Psychoanalysis. She noted that Malinowski discusses freedom as a natural and desirable state of all living beings. As society becomes more complex, freedom becomes dependent upon the use or abuse of authority by the leaders of a given society.

Edmund Leach, reviewing this work for Nature, called it Malinowski's "political testament". It has been described as an "anti-totalitarian" as Malinowski condemned such regimes as existing for the purpose of waging war, and while doing so, trampling on the concept of freedom.

Vinay Kumar Srivastava writing for Sociological Bulletin in 1985 noted that the book is a "full length commentary on freedom". Srivastava later noted that the book might have been better called Freedom and Culture to reflect its contents, also because Malinowski himself admits that advanced civilization is not necessary for freedom to exist. He also summarized Malinowski's argument as follows: freedom is an essential element of culture and civilization. It emerges from culture and is essential for its continuation and development, and when freedom is threatened by an ideology (in particular, totalitarian), cultural progress falters. To prevent wars and totalitarian ideology, Malinowski suggested the formation of world government, in the form of a reinvented League of Nations.

== Reception ==
Compared to most other works by Malinowski, the book has been described as somewhat forgotten.

Thomas I. Cook in 1944 in a review for the American Political Science Review found the book too concerned with criticizing totalitarianism to properly deal with "the disinterested analytical inquiry" into the topic at hand (i.e. the nature of freedom).

In 1967 David Bidney called the book "the most comprehensive analysis of the concept of freedom in contemporary anthropological literature".

Srivastava writing for Dialectical Anthropology in 1993 noted that the book occasionally veers away from scientific rigor into "a passionate appeal", but generally can be considered a valuable work on the relation between freedom and culture.

Writing for Polish journal Przegląd Socjologiczny in 1947, Irena Turnau praised the book for its valuable analysis of the concept of freedom as well for its well developed critique of the necessity of war, but criticized Malinowski's solution (the formation of a world government) as unrealistic. Both Turnau and Cook noted an inherent contradiction in Malinowski's argument that development of social control tools is both infringing upon freedom but also seen by Malinowski as a necessity to safeguard said freedom.
