= Ugatame =

Ugatame is the creator of the universe in Kapauku culture, who created "...because he wanted to do so."

In Kapauku mythology, Ugatame is held as the creator of humanity spirits, the laws of nature, earth and all transgressions. Ugatame has a dual nature of both masculine and feminine qualities and is referred to as the two entities. Similarly, Ugatame is responsible for both "evil" and "good", yet is neither themselves. The sun and the moon are manifestations of Ugatame; the only comprehensible form that humanity can perceive. They live beyond the sky, in a world similar to humanity's world.

Members of the Kapauku sib believe they are related to Ugatame patrilineally. Members of the sib are intrinsically bound to two or more plant or animal species. Consumption of the bound species resulted in punishment in the form of deafness, and are not permitted

== Sources ==
- Pelto, Gretel H. (1976). The human adventure: an introduction to anthropology. Macmillan. pp. 579. ISBN 9780023935503. OCLC 1363475.
- Pospisil, Leopold J. (1958). Kapauku Papuans and their law. Yale University publications in anthropology. p. 296. OCLC 17521859.
- Pospisil, Leopold J. (1978). The Kapauku Papuans of West New Guinea. Holt, Rinehart, and Winston. p. 130. ISBN 9780030416217.
- Yale University Publications in Anthropology. 67. Yale University Press. 1963. OCLC 1586415.
