= Ilana Gershon =

American anthropologist

- Born: Ilana Miriam Gershon; 1971 (age 54–55)

Academic background
- Education: Stanford University (BA); University of Cambridge (MPhil); University of Chicago (PhD)
- Thesis: Making Differences Cultural: Samoan Migrants Encounter New Zealand and United States Government Bureaucracies (2001)
- Doctoral advisor: John D. Kelly

Academic work
- Discipline: Anthropology
- Institutions: Indiana University Bloomington; Rice University

Ilana Miriam Gershon (born 1971) is an American cultural anthropologist whose research examines neoliberalism, new media, and work. She is currently the Herbert S. Autrey Chair in Anthropology and at Rice University. She also maintains the CaMP Anthropology blog, which covers scholarly work at the intersections of communication, media, and performance, and produces the Academic Hiring Rituals: The International Edition podcast for the Association of Political and Legal Anthropology.

Gershon is the author of several books, including The Breakup 2.0: Disconnecting over New Media (2010), No Family Is an Island: Cultural Expertise among Samoans in Diaspora (2012), Down and Out in the New Economy: How People Find (or Don't Find) Work Today (2017), and The Pandemic Workplace: How We Learned to Be Citizens in the Office (2024), all published by Cornell University Press or the University of Chicago Press.

== Education ==
Gershon received a B.A. with honors in History and Philosophy of the Social Sciences from Stanford University in 1993, and an M.Phil. in Social Anthropology from Cambridge University in 1994, where she studied with Marilyn Strathern. She completed her Ph.D. in Cultural Anthropology at the University of Chicago in 2001.

== Career ==
Gershon joined the Department of Communication and Culture at Indiana University Bloomington in 2005. She later moved to the university's Department of Anthropology and in 2018 was named the Ruth Norman Halls Professor of Anthropology in 2018. From 2018 to 2022, Gershon was also a Visiting Professor of Anthropology at the University of Helsinki.

In 2023, Gershon joined the faculty of the Department of Anthropology at Rice University.

== Research and scholarship ==
Gershon's scholarship spans linguistic anthropology, media studies, legal anthropology, the anthropology of democracy, and science and technology studies. Her work is unified by two broad theoretical commitments: understanding how people navigate life across multiple overlapping social orders, and developing a historically grounded account of neoliberalism as a distinct configuration of capitalism. Her earliest book-length research examined Samoan migrants in the United States and New Zealand. Drawing on multi-sited ethnographic fieldwork, she investigated how Samoan cultural brokers navigate institutions — courts, schools, government agencies — that expect them to translate cultural difference on behalf of their communities.

While teaching an undergraduate course on language and culture at Indiana University, Gershon observed that her students consistently described their worst breakup experiences in terms of the medium used—texting, Facebook, instant messaging—rather than the content of the message. The resulting research, based on ethnographic interviews with seventy-two undergraduates, was published as The Breakup 2.0: Disconnecting over New Media (Cornell University Press, 2010).

Gershon's most widely cited theoretical contribution is her analysis of neoliberal agency, developed in a 2011 article in Current Anthropology and extended through her book Down and Out in the New Economy: How People Find (or Don't Find) Work Today (University of Chicago Press, 2017). Drawing on ethnographic fieldwork with job seekers and hiring managers in Northern California, she argued that contemporary American labor markets require workers to conceptualize themselves as bundles of marketable skills—in effect, as businesses selling services to other businesses.

In 2024, Gershon conducted more than two hundred interviews with workers across the United States conducted during the COVID-19 pandemic. This work argues that pandemic-era disruptions to workplace routines forced employees to make newly explicit the implicit social contracts and authority structures that ordinarily govern organizational life. Gershon contends that American workplaces function as a primary site for learning democratic and autocratic modes of political participation—updating, in effect, Alexis de Tocqueville's argument about civic associations.
