= Legal anthropology =

Anthropological study of legal systems

Legal anthropology, also called the anthropology of law, is the sub-discipline of anthropology that studies law, order and dispute across cultures; Carol Greenhouse has summarized it as the cross-cultural study of social ordering. The field asks how societies with and without states define obligations, respond to wrongdoing and settle disputes, and how state law is understood and used by the people subject to it. It grew out of 19th-century comparative jurisprudence, took its modern form through ethnographic fieldwork in the first half of the 20th century, and now overlaps with socio-legal studies, political anthropology and human rights research. Its central debate concerns how to define law outside the state, how to compare legal ideas across cultures without imposing Western categories, and how state, customary, religious and other normative orders coexist, a condition known as legal pluralism.

== History ==
=== Comparative jurisprudence and evolutionism ===
The English jurist Henry Sumner Maine is often credited with founding the field through Ancient Law (1861), which compared early Roman, Hindu and other legal systems. Maine argued that law developed in stages, from judgments pronounced by kings, through customary law, whose knowledge was monopolized by aristocratic and priestly elites, to written codes. He also proposed that "progressive" societies moved from relations fixed by status, especially family status, towards contractual relations between individuals. Later anthropologists rejected the uni-linear evolutionism of Maine and his contemporaries, together with labels such as "pre-law" for stateless societies, though many of the questions Maine raised remained central to the field.

=== Functionalism and early fieldwork ===
Bronisław Malinowski's 1926 work, Crime and Custom in Savage Society, based on fieldwork in the Trobriand Islands, argued that order in a society without courts rested on reciprocal obligations and the social pressure they generated. Malinowski held that law in such societies should be identified by the work it does rather than by its institutional form, a view he restated in his introduction to Ian Hogbin's Law and Order in Polynesia (1934). Isaac Schapera's Handbook of Tsawana Law and Custom (1938) became an influential example of recording customary rules in codified form.

=== Case study method ===
Within the history of Legal Anthropology there have been various methods of data gathering adopted; ranging from literature review of traveller/missionary accounts, consulting informants and lengthy participant observation. Furthermore, when evaluating any research it is appropriate to employ strategic methodology capable of scientifically analysing the topic at hand.

The broad method of study by legal anthropologists prevails upon the Case Study Approach first developed by Llewellyn and Hoebel in The Cheyenne Way (1941) not as “a philosophy but a technology.”

This methodology is applied to situations of cross-cultural conflict and the correlating resolution, which can have sets of legal notions and jural regularities extracted from them.

This method may be safe-guarded against accusations of imposing western ideological structures as it is often an emic sentiment: for example,

“The Tiv drove me to the case method…what they were interested in. They put a lot of time and effort into cases.”

Contemporary research in legal anthropology has sought to apply its framework to issues at the intersections of law and culture, including human rights, legal pluralism, Islamophobia and political uprisings.

== What is law? ==
Legal Anthropology provides a definition of law which differs from that found within modern legal systems. Hoebel (1954) offered the following definition of law: "A social norm is legal if its neglect or infraction is regularly met, in threat or in fact, by the application of physical force by an individual or group possessing the socially recognized privilege of so acting."

Maine argued that human societies passing through three basic stages of legal development, from a group presided over by a senior agnate, through stages of territorial development and culminating in an elite forming normative laws of society, stating that "what the juristical oligarchy now claims is to monopolize the knowledge of the laws, to have the exclusive possession of the principles by which quarrels are decided."

This evolutionary approach, as has been stated, was subsequently replaced within the anthropological discourse by the need to examine the manifestations of law's societal function. As according to Hoebel, law has four functions:

1) to identify socially acceptable lines of behaviour for inclusion in the culture. 2) To allocate authority and who may legitimately apply force. 3) To settle trouble cases. 4) To redefine relationships as the concepts of life change.

Legal theorist H. L. A. Hart, however, stated that law is a body of rules, and is a union of two sets of rules:

1. rules on conduct ("primary rules")
2. rules about recognizing, changing, applying, and adjudicating on rules on conduct ("secondary rules")

Within modern English Theory, law is a discrete and specialized topic. Predominantly positivist in character, it is closely linked to notions of a rule-making body, the judiciary and enforcement agencies. The centralized state organisation and isolates are essentials to the attributes of rules, courts and sanctions. To learn more on this view, see Hobbes. 1651 Leviathan, part 2, chapter 26 or Salmond, J. 1902 Jurisprudence.

However, this view of law is not applicable everywhere. There are many acephalous societies around the world where the above control mechanisms are absent. There are no conceptualized and isolated set of normative rules – these are instead embodied in everyday life. Even when there may be a discrete set of legal norms, these are not treated similarly to the English Legal System's unequivocal power and unchallenged pre-eminence. Shamans, fighting and supernatural means are all mechanisms of superimposing rules within other societies. For example, within Rasmussen’s work of Across Arctic America (1927) he recounts Eskimo nith-songs being used as a public reprimand by expressing the wrongdoing of someone guilty.

Thus, instead of focusing upon the explicit manifestations of law, legal anthropologists have taken to examining the functions of law and how it is expressed. A view expressed by Leopold Pospisil and encapsulated by Bronislaw Malinowski:

"In such primitive communities I personally believe that law ought to be defined by function and not by form, that is we ought to see what are the arrangements, the sociological realities, the cultural mechanisms which act for the enforcement of law."

Thus, law has been studied in ways that may be categorized by as: 1) prescriptive rules 2) observable regularities 3) Instances of dispute.

=== Legal Pluralism ===
Legal scholars noted that many social structures had their own rules and processes that were similar to law, which were referred to as legal orders. The viewpoint that law should be studied together with these legal orders or cannot be seen as fundamentally distinct or separate from them has been referred to as legal pluralism. Some scholars have argued that law is distinct from other law like processes, for example because of its relationship with the state.

== Processual paradigm: order and conflict ==
Order and regulatory behaviour are required if social life is to be maintained. The scale and shade of this behaviour depends on the values and beliefs held by a society deriving from implicit understandings of the norm developed through socialization. There are socially constructed norms with varying degrees of explicitness and levels of order. Conflict may not be interpreted as an extreme pathological event but as a regulatory acting force.

This processual understanding of conflict and dispute became apparent and subsequently heavily theorized upon by the anthropological discipline within the latter half of the nineteenth century as a gateway to the law and order of a society. Disputes have come to be recognised as necessary and constructive over pathological whilst the stated rules of law only explain some aspects of control and compliance. The context and interactions of a dispute are more informative about a culture than the rules.

Classic studies deriving theories of order from disputes include Evans-Pritchard work Witchcraft, Oracles and Magic among the Azande which focused upon functional disputes surrounding sorcery and witchcraft practices, or Comaroff and Roberts (1981) work among the Tswana which examine the hierarchy of disputes, the patterns of contact and the effect norms affect the course of dispute as norms important to dispute are rarely “especially organised for jural purpose.”

Other examples include:

Leach, 1954. Political Systems of Highland Burma. Barth, 1959. Political Leadership among Swat Pathans.

== Law as a system of knowledge ==
Scholars of the sociology of knowledge note that social and power relations can both be created by the definition of knowledge, and influence how knowledge is created.

Scholars have argued that law provides a set of categories and relations through which to see the social world. Individuals themselves (rather than legal professionals) will try to frame their problems in legalistic terms to resolve them. Boaventura de Sousa Santos argues that these legal categories can distort reality, Yngvesson argues that the definitions themselves can create power imbalances.

== Issues of terminology and ethnology ==
Regarding law, in Anthropology's characteristically self-conscious manner, the comparative analysis inherent to Legal Anthropology has been speculated upon and most famously debated by Paul Bohannan and Max Gluckman. The discourse highlights one of the primary differences between British and American Anthropology regarding fieldwork approaches and concerns the imposition of Western terminology as ethnological categories of differing societies.

Each author's uses the Case Study Approach, however, the data's presentation in terms of achieving comparativeness is a point of contention between them.

Paul Bohannan promotes the use of native terminology presented with ethnographic meaning as opposed to any Universal categories, which act as barriers to understanding the true nature of a culture's legal system.

Advocating that it is better to appreciate native terms in their own medium, Bohannan critiques Gluckman's work for its inherent bias.

Gluckman has argued that Bohannan's excessive use of native terminology creates barriers when attempting to achieve comparative analysis. He in turn has suggested that in order to further the cross-cultural comparative study of law, we should use English terms and concepts of law which will aid in the refinement of dispute facts and interrelations. Thus, all native terms should be described and translated into an Anglo-American conceptual equivalent for the purpose of comparison.

== Processes and methodologies ==
As disputes and order began to be recognised as categories worthy of study, interest in the inherent aspects of conflicts emerged within legal anthropology. The processes and actors involved within the events became an object of study for ethnographers as they embraced conflict as a data-rich source.

One example of such an interest is expressed by Philip Gulliver, 1963, Social Control in an African Society in which the intimate relations between disputes are postulated as being important. He examines the patterns of alliance between actors of a dispute and the strategies that develop as a result, the roles of mediators and the typologies for intervention. Another is Sara Ross, whose work Law and Intangible Cultural Heritage in the City focuses the rubric of legal anthropology specifically onto the urban context through an "urban legal anthropology", that includes the use of virtual ethnography, institutional ethnography, and participant observation in urban public and private spaces.

== Key questions in legal anthropology ==
- Issues of Legal Pluralism.

See Lyon, 2002 Local arbitration and conflict deferment in Punjab, Pakistan or Engel, D. 1980. Legal pluralism in an American community: perspectives on a civil trial court.

- The legitimacy of Universal Human Rights.

Political anthropologists have had much to say about the UDHR (Universal Declaration of Human Rights). Original critiques, most notably by the AAA (American Anthropological Association), argued that cultural ideas of rights and entitlement differ between societies. They warned that any attempt to endorse one set of values above all others amounted to a new western imperialism, and would be counter to ideas of cultural relativism. Most anthropologists now agree that universal human rights have a useful place in today's world. Zechenter (1997) argues there are practices, such as Indian 'sati' (the burning of a widow on her husband's funeral pyre) that can be said to be wrong, despite justifications of tradition. This is because such practices are about much more than a culturally established world view, and frequently develop or revive as a result of socio-economic conditions and the balance of power within a community. As culture is not bounded and unchanging, there are multiple discourses and moral viewpoints within any community and among the various actors in such events (Merry 2003). Cultural relativists risk supporting the most powerfully asserted position at the expense of those who are subjugated under it.

More recent contributions to the question of universal human rights include analysis of their use in practice, and how global discourses are translated into local contexts (Merry 2003). Anthropologists such as Merry (2006) note how the legal framework of the UNDHR is not static but is actively used by communities around the globe to construct meaning. As much as the document is a product of western Enlightenment thinking, communities have the capacity to shape its meaning to suit their own agendas, incorporating its principles in ways that empower them to tackle their own local and national discontents.

Female genital cutting (FGC), also known as female circumcision or female genital mutilation remains a hotly debated, controversial issue contested particularly among legal anthropologists and human rights activists. Through her ethnography (1989) on the practice of pharaonic circumcision among the Hofriyat of Sudan (1989) Boddy maintains that understanding local cultural norms is of crucial importance when considering intervention to prevent the practice. Human rights activists attempting to eradicate FGC using the legal framework of the Universal Declaration of Human Rights (UDHR) as their justification, run the risk of imposing a set of ideological principles, alien to the culture attempting to be helped, potentially facing hostile reactions. Moreover, the UNDHR as a legal document, is contested by some as being restrictive in its prescription of what is and is not deemed a violation of a human right (Ross 2003) and overlooks local customary justifications which operate outside of an international legalistic framework (Ross 2003). Increasingly (FGC) is becoming a global issue due to increased mobility. What was once deemed a largely African practice has seen a steady increase in European countries such as Britain. Although made illegal in 1985 there have as yet been no convictions and girls as old as nine continue to have the procedure. Legislation has now also been passed in Sweden, the United States and France where there have been convictions. Black, J. A. and Debelle, G. D. (1995) "Female Genital Mutilation in Britain" British Medical Journal.

== Further information ==
There are a number of useful introductions to the field of legal anthropology, Sally Falk Moore, a leading legal anthropologist, held both a law degree and a PhD in anthropology. An increasing number of legal anthropologists hold both JDs and advanced degrees in anthropology, and some teach in law schools while maintaining scholarly connections within the field of legal anthropology; examples include Rebecca French, John Conley, Elizabeth Mertz, and Annelise Riles. Such combined expertise has also been turned to more applied anthropological pursuits such as tribal advocacy and forensic ethnography by practitioners. There is a growing interest in the intersection of legal and linguistic anthropology.

If looking for anthropology departments with faculty specializing in legal anthropology in North America, try the following schools and professors: University of California, Berkeley (Laura Nader), University of California, Irvine (Susan Bibler Coutin, Bill Maurer, Justin B. Richland), Duke University (William M. O'Barr), Princeton University (Lawrence Rosen, Carol J. Greenhouse), State University of New York at Buffalo (Rebecca French), New York University (Sally Engle Merry), Harvard University (Jean Comaroff), and George Mason University (Susan Hirsch).

The Association for Political and Legal Anthropology (APLA), a section of the American Anthropological Association, is the primary professional association in the U.S. for legal anthropologists and also has many overseas members. It publishes PoLAR: Political and Legal Anthropology Review, the leading U.S. journal in the field of legal anthropology, which is accessible via http://polarjournal.org/ or http://onlinelibrary.wiley.com/journal/10.1111/(ISSN)1555-2934

LawNet is a network of the European Association of Social Anthropologists that brings together EASA members who share an interest in how humans and non-humans, communities, institutions, corporations, movements, etc. engage law to address socio-political issues of justice, power, racism, human rights, climate change and global inequalities.

'Allegra lab' is an online publication platform that seeks to facilitate scholarly awareness of the sub-discipline.

== See also ==
- Anthropology
- Forensic anthropology
- Indigenous law
- Political anthropology
- Law and Society Association
- New legal realism
- Sociology of law
- Philosophy of law

== Sources ==
- Boddy J. (1982). “Womb As Oasis: The Symbolic Context of Pharonic Circumcision in Rutal Northern Sudan” American Ethnologist. 9(4), pp. 682–698.
- Bohannan, P. 1957. Justice and Judgement among the Tiv.
- Comaroff and Roberts. 1977. The Invocation of Norms in Dispute Settlement: The Tswana Case. Social Anthropology and Law.
- Gulliver, P. 1963. Social Control in an African Society.
- Roberts, S. 1979. Order and Dispute: An Introduction to Legal Anthropology
- Llwellyn and Hoebel. 1941. The Cheyenne Way.
- Pospisil, L. 1974. The Anthropology of Laws: A Comparative Theory
- Hamnett, I. 1977. Social Anthropology and Law.
- MacFarlane, A. History of Legal Anthropology: Part One.
- Malinowski, B. 1926. Crime and Custom in Savage Society.
- Lyon, S. Durham University Lecture Series. Department of Anthropology: Power and Governance.
- Ross F. (2003). “Using Rights to Measure Wrongs: A Case Study of Method and Moral in the Work of the South African Truth and Reconciliation Commission”. In: Wilson A., Mitchell J P. eds. Human Rights in Global Perspective. Anthropological Studies of Rights, Claims and Entitlements. London: Routledge, pp 163–182.
- Schapera, I. 1938. A Handbook of Tswana Law and Custom.
- Wesel, U. 1985. Frühformen des Rechts in vorstaatlichen Gesellschaften, Suhrkamp Verlag, Frankfurt am Main, ISBN 3-518-57723-9 (paperback) and ISBN 3-518-57706-9 (hard cover)
- Zippelius, R. 2011. Rechtsphilosophie, §§ 5 IV 2, 8, 9 I, 12 IV, 17 II, 19 IV, 25, C.H. Beck, Munich, ISBN 978-3-406-61191-9
