= The Father in Primitive Psychology =

1927 anthropology book

The Father in Primitive Psychology is a 1927 book by Polish anthropologist Bronisław Malinowski, describing the role of the father in the family of the Trobriand islanders.
