= Bronisław Malinowski =

Polish anthropologist and ethnographer (1884–1942)

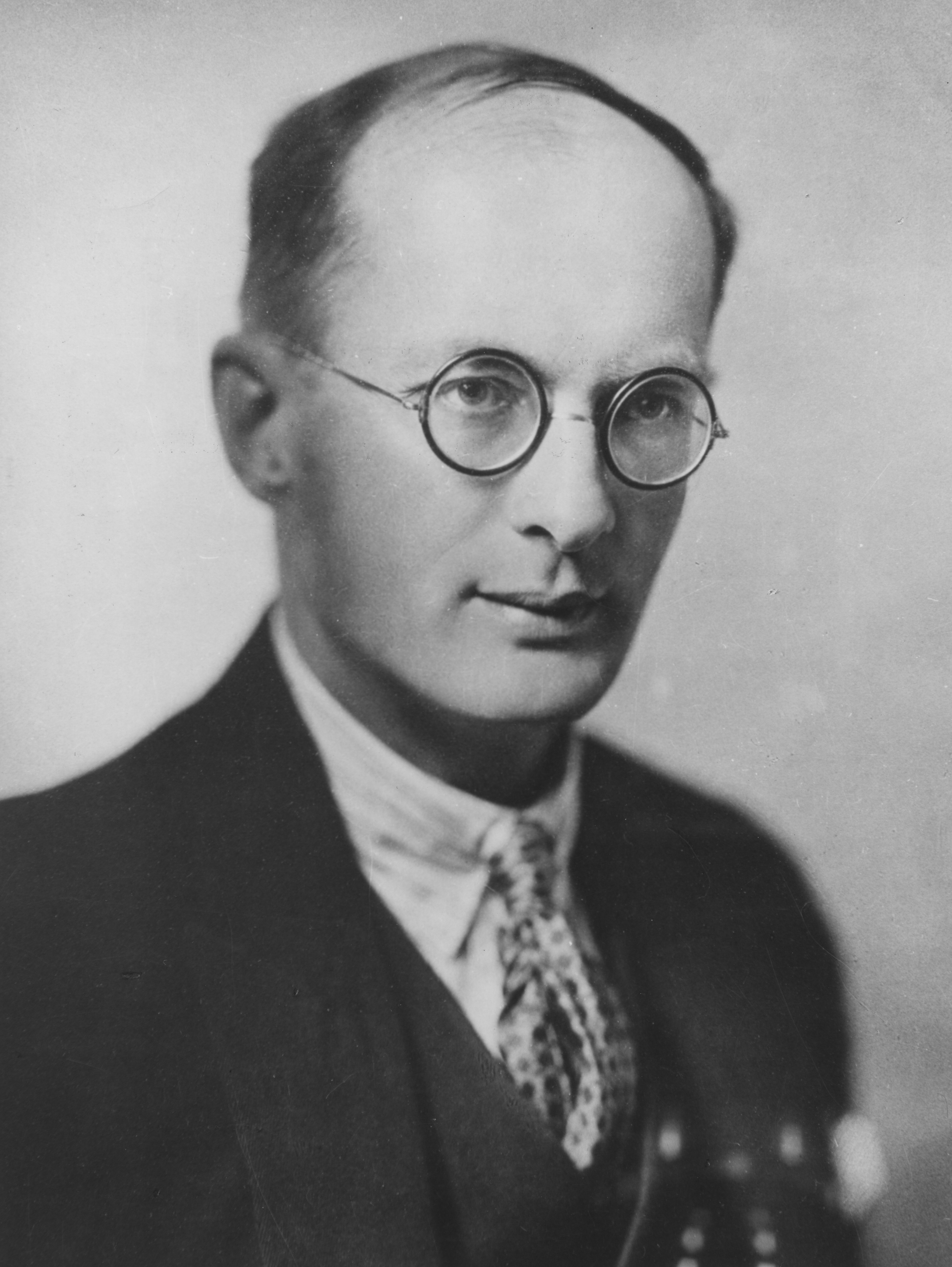
- Malinowski, c. 1930
- Born: Bronisław Kasper Malinowski; 7 April 1884; Kraków, Grand Duchy of Kraków, Austria-Hungary
- Died: 16 May 1942 (aged 58); New Haven, Connecticut, United States
- Citizenship: Austria-Hungary (until 1918); Poland (from 1918); United Kingdom (from 1931)
- Education: Jagiellonian University (PhD, 1908); London School of Economics (DSc, 1916)
- Known for: Father of social anthropology, popularizing fieldwork, participatory observation, ethnography and psychological functionalism
- Spouses: Elsie Rosaline Masson (m. 1919; died 1935); Valetta Swann (m. 1940)
- Children: 3
- Father: Lucjan Malinowski
- Scientific career
- Fields: Anthropology; philosophy; economics
- Workplaces: London School of Economics; Yale University
- Thesis: On the Principle of the Economy of Thought (1908)
- Doctoral students: See list: Edmund Leach; Phyllis Kaberry; Hilda Kuper; Audrey Richards; Ralph Piddington
- Other notable students: See list: Jomo Kenyatta; Raymond Firth; E. E. Evans-Pritchard; Z. K. Matthews; H. Powdermaker; Meyer Fortes; Fei Xiaotong

Bronisław Kasper Malinowski (Polish: [brɔˈɲiswaf maliˈnɔfskʲi]; 7 April 1884 – 16 May 1942) was a Polish (Note: Bronisław Malinowski was born into a Polish family in a historic Polish region then administered by the Austro-Hungarian Empire (see also: Austrian partition of Poland). In 1910, aged 26, he immigrated to the United Kingdom and spent most of his remaining life—some three decades—working there. After Poland regained independence in 1918, he became a Polish citizen but continued living in Great Britain. In 1931 he also obtained British citizenship. In his preface to a 1937 Polish-language edition of his 1929 book, The Sexual Life of Savages in North-Western Melanesia, he wrote: "I happened to work in a foreign milieu, and served Polish learning only indirectly. But did I cease serving Polish learning as I cast my scholarship into the international arena and worked in conditions that allowed me to achieve enhanced results? I think not. I have always served Polish learning, not less so than others, but differently. Polish learning required such services, performed abroad. I never ceased feeling Polish and, if the need arose to emphasize it, I was always able to do so." Malinowski is described in sources as Polish, Polish-born British, or Polish-British.) anthropologist and ethnologist whose writings on ethnography, social theory, and field research have exerted a lasting influence on the discipline of anthropology.

Malinowski was born and raised in what was part of the Austrian partition of Poland, Kraków. He graduated from King John III Sobieski 2nd High School. In the years 1902–1906 he studied at the philosophy department of the Jagiellonian University and received his doctorate there in 1908. In 1910, at the London School of Economics (LSE), he worked on exchange and economics, analysing Aboriginal Australia through ethnographic documents. In 1914, he travelled to Australia. He conducted research in the Trobriand Islands and other regions in New Guinea and Melanesia where he stayed for several years, studying indigenous cultures.

Returning to England after World War I, he published his principal work, Argonauts of the Western Pacific (1922), which established him as one of Europe's most important anthropologists. He took posts as a lecturer and later as chair in anthropology at the LSE, attracting large numbers of students and exerting great influence on the development of British social anthropology. Over the years, he guest-lectured at several American universities; when World War II broke out, he remained in the United States, taking an appointment at Yale University. He died in 1942 while at Yale and was interred in a grave in New Haven, Connecticut. In 1967 his widow, Valetta Swann, published his personal diary kept during his fieldwork in Melanesia and New Guinea. It has since been a source of controversy, because of its ethnocentric and egocentric nature.

Malinowski's ethnography of the Trobriand Islands described the complex institution of the Kula ring and became foundational for subsequent theories of reciprocity and exchange. He was also widely regarded as an eminent fieldworker, and his texts regarding anthropological field methods were foundational to early anthropology, popularizing the concept of participatory observation. His approach to social theory was a form of psychological functionalism that emphasised how social and cultural institutions serve basic human needs—a perspective opposed to A. R. Radcliffe-Brown's structural functionalism, which emphasised ways in which social institutions function in relation to society as a whole.

== Biography ==
=== Early life ===
Malinowski, a scion of the Polish szlachta (nobility), was born on 7 April 1884 in Kraków, in the Austrian Partition of the former Polish-Lithuanian Commonwealth – then part of the Austro-Hungarian province known as the Kingdom of Galicia and Lodomeria. His father, Lucjan Malinowski, was a professor of Slavic philology at Jagiellonian University, and his mother was the daughter of a landowning family. As a child he was frail, often in ill health, but excelled academically. On 30 May 1902 he passed his matura examinations (with distinction) at the Jan III Sobieski Secondary School, and later that year began studying at the College of Philosophy of Kraków's Jagiellonian University, where he initially focused on mathematics and the physical sciences.

While attending the university he became severely ill (possibly with tuberculosis), and while he recuperated his interest turned more toward the social sciences as he took courses in philosophy and education. In 1908 he received a doctorate in philosophy from Jagiellonian University; his thesis was titled On the Principle of the Economy of Thought.

During his student years he became interested in travel abroad, and visited Finland, Italy, the Canary Islands, western Asia, and North Africa; some of those travels were at least partly motivated by health concerns. He also spent three semesters at the University of Leipzig (c. 1909–1910), where he studied under economist Karl Bücher and psychologist Wilhelm Wundt, and examined the works of anthropologist Heinrich Schurtz. After reading James Frazer's The Golden Bough, he decided to become an anthropologist.

In 1910 he went to England, becoming a postgraduate student at the London School of Economics (LSE), where his mentors included C. G. Seligman and Edvard Westermarck.

=== Career ===
In 1911 Malinowski published, in Polish, his first academic paper, "Totemizm i egzogamia" ('Totemism and Exogamy'), in Lud. The following year he published his first English-language academic paper, (Note: Probably "The Economic Aspect of the Intichiuma Ceremonies". He had already in 1910 published a book review in English in Man, the journal of the Royal Anthropological Institute, and another there in 1911. For more on Malinowski's early writings, see The Early Writings of Bronislaw Malinowski (1993, 2006) by Robert J. Thornton and Peter Skalnik.) and in 1913 his first book, The Family among the Australian Aborigines. In the same year he gave his first lectures at LSE, on topics related to psychology of religion and social psychology.

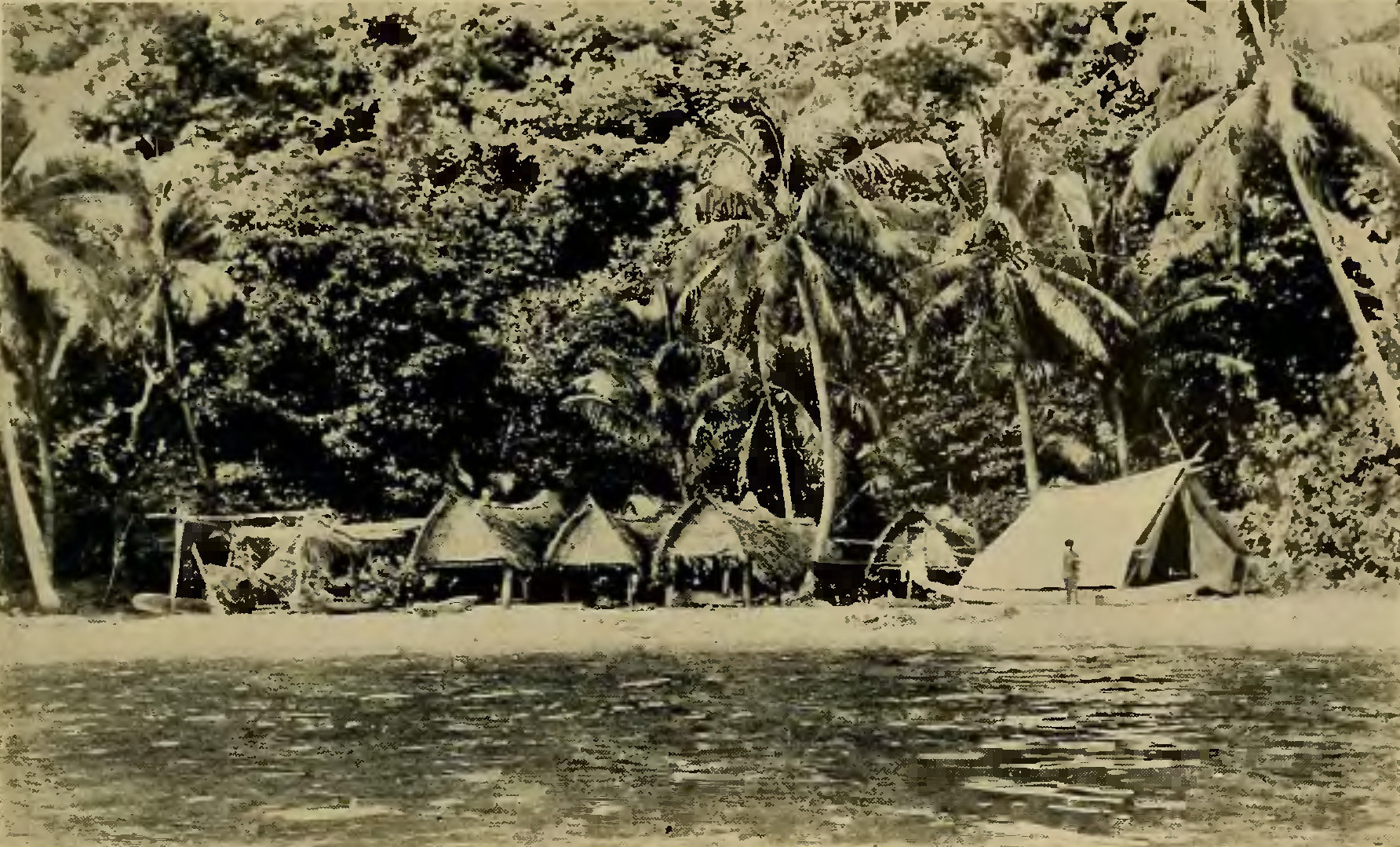
Plate I photo, Malinowski's Argonauts of the Western Pacific (1922), showing a village and Malinowski's tent

In June 1914 he departed London, travelling to Australia, as the first step in his expedition to Papua (in what would later become Papua New Guinea). The expedition was organised under the aegis of the British Association for the Advancement of Science (BAAS). Initially Malinowski's journey to Australia was supposed to last only about half a year, as he was mainly planning on attending a conference there, and travelled there in the capacity of secretary to Robert Ranulph Marett. Shortly afterward, his situation became complicated due to the outbreak of World War I. Being a subject of Austria-Hungary, which was at war with the United Kingdom, Malinowski risked internment. He nonetheless decided not to return to Europe, and after intervention by a number of his colleagues, including Marett as well as Alfred Cort Haddon, the Australian authorities allowed him to stay in the region and even provided him with new funding.

His first field trip, lasting from August 1914 to March 1915, took him to the Toulon Island (Mailu Island) and the Woodlark Island. This field trip was described in his 1915 monograph The Natives of Mailu. Subsequently, he conducted research in the Trobriand Islands in the Melanesia region. He organized two larger expeditions during that time; from May 1915 to May 1916, and October 1917 to October 1918, in addition to several shorter excursions. It was during this period that he conducted his fieldwork on the Kula ring (a ceremonial exchange system conducted by the natives he studied) and advanced the practice of participant observation, which remains the hallmark of ethnographic research today. The ethnographic collection of artifacts from his expeditions is mostly held by the British Museum and the Melbourne Museum. During the breaks in between his expeditions he stayed in Melbourne, writing up his research, and publishing new articles, such as Baloma; the Spirits of the Dead in the Trobriand Islands. In 1916 he received the title of Doctor of Sciences.

In 1919, he returned to Europe, staying at Tenerife for over a year before coming back to England in 1920 and finally to London in 1921. He resumed teaching at the LSE, accepting a position as a lecturer, declining a job offer from the Polish Jagiellonian University. The following year, his book Argonauts of the Western Pacific, often described as his masterpiece, was published. For the next two decades, he would establish the LSE as Europe's main centre of anthropology. In 1924 he was promoted to a reader, and in 1927, a full professor (foundation Professor of Social Anthropology). In 1930 he became a corresponding foreign member of the Polish Academy of Arts and Sciences. In 1933, he became a foreign member of the Royal Netherlands Academy of Arts and Sciences. In 1934 he travelled to British East Africa and Southern Africa, carrying out research among several tribes such as the Bemba, Kikuyu, Maragoli, Maasai and the Swazi people. The period 1926-1935 was the most productive time of his career, seeing the publications of many articles and several more books.

Malinowski taught intermittently in the United States, which he first visited in 1926 to study the Hopi. In 1932-1933, Malinowski delivered the Messenger Lectures at Cornell University. When World War II broke out during one of his American visits, he stayed there. He became an outspoken critic of Nazi Germany, arguing that it posed a threat to civilization, and he repeatedly urged US citizens to abandon their neutrality; his books duly became banned in Germany. In 1941 he carried out field research among the Mexican peasants in Oaxaca. He took up a position at Yale University as a visiting professor, where he remained until his death. In 1942 he co-founded the Polish Institute of Arts and Sciences of America, of which he became its first president.

In addition to his work in academia, he has been described as a "wittily entertaining pundit" who wrote and spoke in media of the day on various issues, such as religion and race relations, nationalism, totalitarianism, and war, as well as birth control and sex education. He was a supporter of the British Social Hygiene Council, Mass-Observation, and the International African Institute.

Malinowski died in New Haven, Connecticut on 16 May 1942, aged 58, of a stroke while preparing to resume his fieldwork in Oaxaca. He was interred at Evergreen Cemetery in New Haven.

== Works ==
Except for a few works from the early 1910s, all of Malinowski's research was published in English. His first book, The Family among the Australian Aborigines, published in 1913, was based on materials he collected and wrote in the years 1909–1911. It was well-received not only by contemporary reviewers but also by scholars generations later. In 1963, in his foreword to its new edition, John Arundel Barnes called it an epochal work, and noted how it discredited the previously held theory that Australian Aborigines had no institution of family.

Published in 1922, Argonauts of the Western Pacific, about the society and economy of Trobriand people who live on the small Kiriwana island chain northeast of the island of New Guinea, was widely regarded as a masterpiece and significantly boosted Malinowski's reputation in the world of academia. His later books included Crime and Custom in Savage Society (1926), Myth in Primitive Psychology (1926), Sex and Repression in Savage Society (1927), The Father in Primitive Psychology (1927), The Sexual Life of Savages in North-Western Melanesia (1929), and Coral Gardens and Their Magic (1935). The works tackled issues such as reciprocity and quasi-legal sanctions (in Crime...), psychoanalysis of ethnographic findings (in Sex and Repression...) courtship, sex, marriage, and the family (in The Sexual Life...), and perceived connections between agriculture and magic (in Coral Gardens...).

Malinowski coined the phatic communion, referring to the usage of language not to convey meaning, but to bind the hearer to the speaker by a tie of social sentiment, in his essay "The Problem of Meaning in Primitive Languages", which appeared in 1923 as a supplementary contribution to The Meaning of Meaning by C. K. Ogden and I. A. Richards.

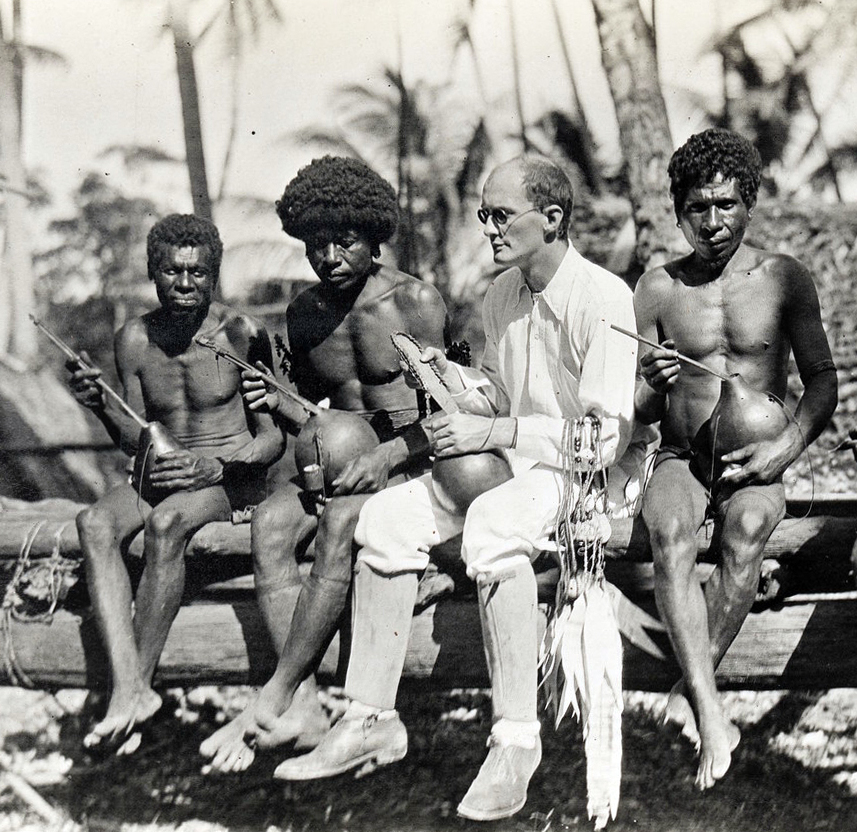
Bronislaw Malinowski with natives on Trobriand Islands; between October 1917 and October 1918.

His paper "Psycho-Analysis and Anthropology" (1924) is believed to be the first use of the term "nuclear family". He incorporated the paper into his Sex and Repression in Savage Society (1927).

A number of his works were published posthumously or collected in anthologies: A Scientific Theory of Culture and Others Essays (1944), Freedom & Civilization (1944), The Dynamics of Culture Change (1945), Magic, Science and Religion and Other Essays (1948), Sex, Culture, and Myth (1962), the controversial A Diary in the Strict Sense of the Term (1967), and The Early Writings of Bronislaw Malinowski (1993).

Malinowski's personal diary, along with several others written in Polish, was discovered in his Yale University office after his death. First published in 1967, covering the period of his fieldwork in 1914–1915 and 1917–1918 in New Guinea and the Trobriand Islands, it set off a storm of controversy and what Michael W. Young called a "moral crisis of the discipline". Writing in 1987, James Clifford called it "a crucial document for the history of anthropology".

Many of Malinowski's works entered public domain in 2013.

== Ideas and influences ==
Already a year after his death Clyde Kluckhohn described his influence in the field as significant if somewhat controversial, noting that to some he "was a major prophet", and that "no anthropologist has ever had so wide a popular audience". In 1974, Witold Armon described many of his works as "classics". Michael W. Young outlined Malinowski's major contributions as the comparative study of concepts of kinship, marriage, the family; magic, mythology, and religion. His work impacted numerous fields such as economic anthropology; comparative law; and pragmatic linguistic theory.

=== Ethnography and fieldwork ===
Malinowski is considered one of anthropology's most skilled ethnographers, especially because of his highly methodical and well-theorised approach to the study of social systems. He is often referred to as the first researcher to bring anthropology "off the verandah" (a phrase that is also the name of André Singer's 1986 documentary about his work (Note: "Bronislaw Malinowski: Off the Veranda." 52 minutes. Films Media Group, 1985.)), that is, stressing the need for fieldwork enabling the researcher to experience the everyday life of his subjects along with them. Malinowski emphasized the importance of detailed participant observation and argued that anthropologists must have daily contact with their informants if they are to adequately record the "imponderabilia of everyday life" that are so important to understanding a different culture. He stated that the goal of the anthropologist, or ethnographer, is "to grasp the native's point of view, his relation to life, to realize his vision of his world". Because of the influence of his argument, he is sometimes credited, particularly in the United Kingdom, with having invented the field of ethnography. J. I. (Hans) Bakker says that Malinowski "wrote at least two of the 100 most significant ethnographies of all time".

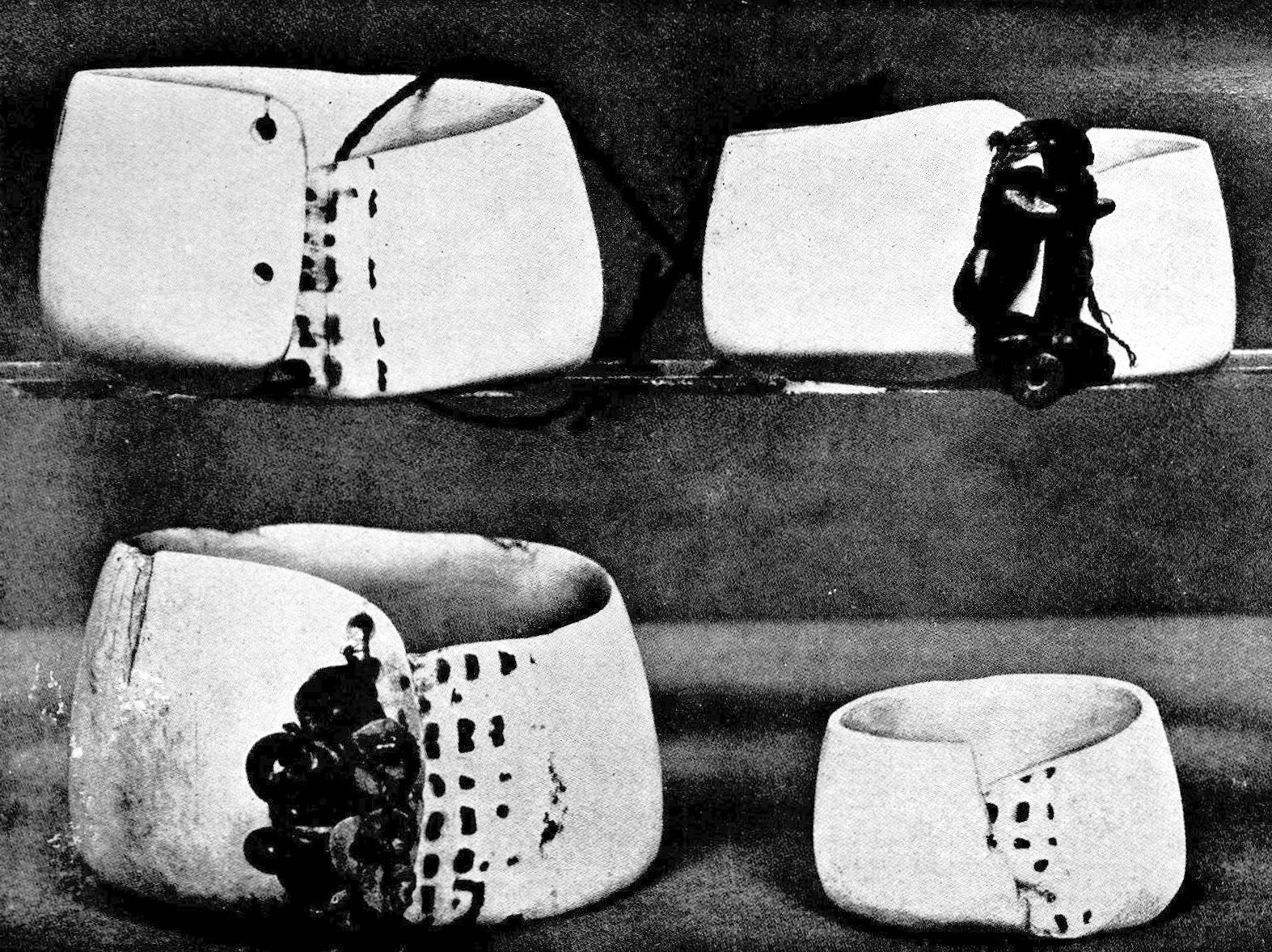
Four mwali, one of the two main kinds of objects in Melanesia's Kula ritual. Photo in Malinowski's Argonauts of the Western Pacific (1922).

Malinowski in his pioneering (Note: Malinowski is said to have "gone native" around 1915–1916; another American scholar, John Layard, did so around the same time as well (in 1917). Chris Gosden wrote that "Malinowski's claim to have moved anthropological fieldwork from the verandah into the village has considerable truth to it, even if this is not the whole truth [as] there is much more continuity between himself and his predecessors than Malinowski allowed for". Max Gluckman noted that Malinowski developed the idea of fieldwork, but it originated with Alfred Cort Haddon in England and Franz Boas in the United States. Robert G. Burgess concluded that "it is Malinowski who is usually credited with being the originator of intensive anthropological field research".) research set up a tent in the middle of villages he studied, in which he lived for extended periods of time, weeks or months. His argument was shaped by his initial experiences as an anthropologist in the mid-1910s in Australia and Oceania, where during his first field trip he found himself grossly unprepared for it, due to not knowing the language of the people he set to study, nor being able to observe their daily customs sufficiently (during that initial trip, he was lodged with a local missionary and just made daily trips to the village, an endeavor which became increasingly difficult once he lost his translator). His pioneering decision to subsequently immerse himself in the life of the natives represents his solution to this problem, and was the message he addressed to new, young anthropologists, aiming to both improve their experience and allow them to produce better data.

He advocated that stance from his very first publications, which were often harshly critical of those of his elders in the field of anthropology, who did most of their writing based on second-hand accounts. This could be seen in the relation between Frazer - an influential early anthropologist, nonetheless described as the classic armchair scholar - and Malinowski, which was complex; Frazer was one of Malinowski's mentors and supporters, and his work is credited with inspiring young Malinowski to become an anthropologist. At the same time, Malinowski was critical of Frazer from his early days, and it has been suggested that what he learned from Frazer was not "how to be an anthropologist" but "how not to do anthropology". Ian Jarvie wrote that many of Malinowski's writing represented an "attack" on Frazer's school of fieldwork, although James A. Boon suggested this conflict has been exaggerated.

His early works also contributed to scientific study of sex, previously restricted due to Euro-American prudery and views on morality. Malinowski's interest in the topic has been attributed to his Slavic background having made him less concerned with "Anglo-Saxon puritanism".

=== Functionalism and other theories ===
Malinowski has been credited with originating, or being one of the main originators of, the school of social anthropology known as functionalism. It has been suggested that he was here inspired by the views of William James. In contrast to Alfred Radcliffe-Brown's structural functionalism, Malinowski's psychological functionalism held that culture functioned to meet the needs of individuals rather than the needs of society as a whole. He reasoned that when the needs of individuals, who comprise society, are met, then the needs of society are met. Malinowski understood basic needs as arising from the necessities of biology; and culture, as group cooperation – as a way of addressing the basic needs. Thus, biological needs include metabolism, reproduction, bodily comforts, safety, movement, growth, and health; and the corresponding cultural responses are a food supply, kinship, shelter, protection, activities, training, and hygiene.

The development of Malinowski's theory of psychological functionalism was intimately tied to his focus on the importance of fieldwork: the anthropologist must, via empirical observation, investigate the functions of the customs observed in the present. To Malinowski, people's feelings and motives were crucial to understanding the way their society functioned, which he outlined as follows:

Besides the firm outline of tribal constitution and crystallized cultural items which form the skeleton, besides the data of daily life and ordinary behavior, which are, so to speak, its flesh and blood, there is still to be recorded the spirit—the natives' views and opinions and utterances.

— Argonauts, p. 22.

Malinowski, in what is considered an important contribution to cross-cultural psychology, challenged the claim, to universality, of Freud's theory of the Oedipus complex. Malinowski initiated a cross-cultural approach in Sex and Repression in Savage Society (1927), demonstrating that specific psychological complexes are not universal.

In 1920 he published his first scientific article on the Kula ring. In reference to the Kula ring, he later wrote:

Yet it must be remembered that what appears to us an extensive, complicated, and yet well ordered institution is the outcome of so many doings and pursuits, carried on by savages, who have no laws or aims or charters definitely laid down. They have no knowledge of the total outline of any of their social structure. They know their own motives, know the purpose of individual actions and the rules which apply to them, but how, out of these, the whole collective institution shapes, this is beyond their mental range. Not even the most intelligent native has any clear idea of the Kula as a big, organised social construction, still less of its sociological function and implications...The integration of all the details observed, the achievement of a sociological synthesis of all the various, relevant symptoms, is the task of the Ethnographer... the Ethnographer has to construct the picture of the big institution, very much as the physicist constructs his theory from the experimental data, which always have been within reach of everybody, but needed a consistent interpretation.

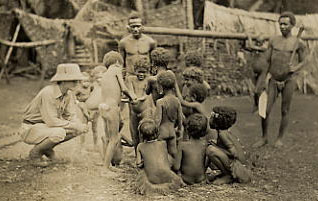
Malinowski with Trobriand Islanders, 1918

In these two passages, Malinowski anticipated the distinction between description and analysis, and between the views of actors and analysts. This distinction continues to inform anthropological methods and theories. His research on the Trobriand traditional economy, with its particular focus on magic and magicians, has been described as a substantial contribution to economic anthropology.

Overall, Malinowski has been credited with "contesting existing stereotypes", such as dismissals of "primitive economics", through his study of the Kula ring, which demonstrated how economics was embedded in culture. He criticized the term "primitive superstition", demonstrating complex relations among magic, science, and religion. Likewise his study of sexuality undermined simplistic views of "primitive sexuality".

Malinowski influenced African studies, serving as academic mentor to Jomo Kenyatta, the father and first president of modern Kenya. Malinowski wrote the introduction to Facing Mount Kenya, Kenyatta's ethnographic study of the Kikuyu. Many of Malinowski's students worked in Africa, likely due to his involvement with the International African Institute.

=== Teacher ===
Malinowski is considered to have raised the next generation of anthropologists, particularly British. Many of his students adopted his functionalist approach. As a teacher, he preferred lectures to discussions; his seminars have been called "electrifying". He has been praised for his friendly and egalitarian attitude towards women students. Among his students were such future social scientists as Hilda Beemer Kuper, Edith Clarke, Kazimierz Dobrowolski, Raymond Firth, Meyer Fortes, Feliks Gross, Francis L. K. Hsu, Phyllis Kaberry, Jomo Kenyatta, Edmund Leach, Lucy Mair, Z. K. Matthews, Józef Obrębski, Maria Ossowska, Stanisław Ossowski, Ralph Piddington, Hortense Powdermaker, E. E. Evans-Pritchard, Margaret Read, Audrey Richards, Isaac Schapera, Andrzej Jan Waligórski, Camilla Wedgwood, Monica Wilson and Fei Xiaotong.

== Legacy ==
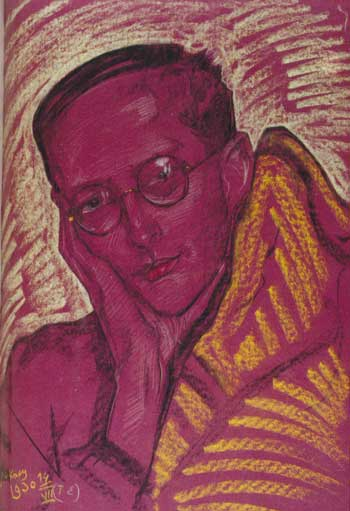
Portrait of Malinowski by Witkacy, 1930

The Malinowski Memorial Lecture, an annual anthropology lecture series at the LSE, inaugurated in 1959, is named after him. A student-led anthropology magazine at the LSE, The Argonaut, took its name from Malinowski's Argonauts of the Western Pacific.

The Society for Applied Anthropology established the Bronislaw Malinowski Award in his honor in 1950. The award was awarded only until 1952, then went on hiatus until being re-established in 1973; it has been awarded annually since.

Stanisław Ignacy Witkiewicz based a character, Duke of Nevermore, from his novel The 622 Downfalls of Bungo or The Demonic Woman (written in the 1910s but not published until 1972) on Malinowski.

In 1957 Raymond Firth edited a book dedicated to the life and work of Malinowski, Man and Culture. Other works about Malinowski have appeared since, such as Michael W. Young's Malinowski: Odyssey of an Anthropologist, 1884–1920 (2004).

He is portrayed by Tom Courtenay in the Young Indiana Jones TV movie Treasure of the Peacock's Eye.

The life and work of Malinowski is the subject of a documentary film Tales From The Jungle: Malinowski aired by BBC Four channel in 2007.

== Personal life ==
In his youth he was a close friend of Stanisław Ignacy Witkiewicz, a Polish artist; this friendship had much impact on Malinowski's early life. They had a romantic triangle with Zofia Romer née Dembowska. Throughout his life he gained the reputation of a philanderer.

His other friends from his student times included Maria Czaplicka, the first female lecturer in anthropology at Oxford University.

In 1919 Malinowski married Elsie Rosaline Masson, an Australian photographer, writer, and traveler (daughter of David Orme Masson), with whom he had three daughters: Józefa (born 1920), Wanda (born 1922), and Helena (born 1925). Elsie died in 1935, and in 1940 Malinowski married the English painter Valetta Swann. Malinowski's daughter Helena Malinowska Wayne wrote several articles on her father's life and a book about her parents.

While Malinowski was brought up in the Catholic faith, after his mother's death he described himself as agnostic.

== Selected publications ==
- Malinowski, B. (1913). The Family Among the Australian Aborigines: A Sociological Study. London: University of London Press.
- ————— (1922). Argonauts of the Western Pacific: An Account of Native Enterprise and Adventure in the Archipelagoes of Melanesian New Guinea. London: Routledge and Kegan Paul (Enhanced Edition reissued Long Grove, IL: Waveland Press, 2013).
- ————— (1924). "Mutterrechtliche Familie und Ödipus-Komplex" [Psycho-Analysis and Anthropology]. Imago: Zeitschrift für Anwendung der Psychoanalyse auf die Geisteswissenschaften. 10: 228–77.
- ————— (1924). "Psycho-Analysis and Anthropology". Psyche: An Annual of General and Linguistic Psychology. 4: 293–332.
- ————— (1926). Myth in Primitive Psychology. London: Norton.
- ————— (1926). Crime and Custom in Savage Society. New York: Harcourt, Brace & Co.
- ————— (1927). Sex and Repression in Savage Society. London: Kegan Paul, Trench, Trubner & Co.
- ————— H. Ellis (1929). The Sexual Life of Savages in North-Western Melanesia. An Ethnographic Account of Courtship, Marriage, and Family Life Among the Natives of the Trobriand Islands, British New Guinea. London.
- ————— E. R. Leach; J. Berry (1935). Coral Gardens and Their Magic. London: Allen & Unwin.
- ————— (1944). A Scientific Theory of Culture and Others Essays. Chapel Hill, N. Carolina: The University of North Carolina Press.
- ————— (1947). Freedom & Civilization. London.
- ————— (1946). P. M. Kaberry (ed.). The Dynamics of Culture Change: An Inquiry Into Race Relations in Africa. New Haven: Yale University Press.
- ————— (1948). Magic, Science and Religion and Other Essays. Glencoe, Illinois: The Free Press (Reissued Long Grove, IL: Waveland Press, 1992).
- ————— (1962). Sex, Culture, and Myth. New York: Harcourt, Brace & World.
- ————— (1967). A Diary in the Strict Sense of the Term. New York: Harcourt, Brace & World.
- ————— (1993). R. J. Thornton & P. Skalnik (ed.). The early writings. Cambridge: Cambridge University Press.

== See also ==
- List of Polish people
