= Coral Gardens and Their Magic =

Two-volume book by Bronisław Malinowski

Coral Gardens and Their Magic: A Study of the Methods of Tilling the Soil and of Agricultural Rites in the Trobriand Islands
- Title page for Coral Gardens and Their Magic: A Study of the Methods of Tilling the Soil and of Agricultural Rites in the Trobriand Islands (1935)
- Author: Bronisław Malinowski
- Language: English
- Subject: Ethnography
- Publisher: Routledge
- Publication date: 1935
- Media type: Print
- OCLC: 180613846
- Preceded by: The Sexual Life of Savages in North-Western Melanesia

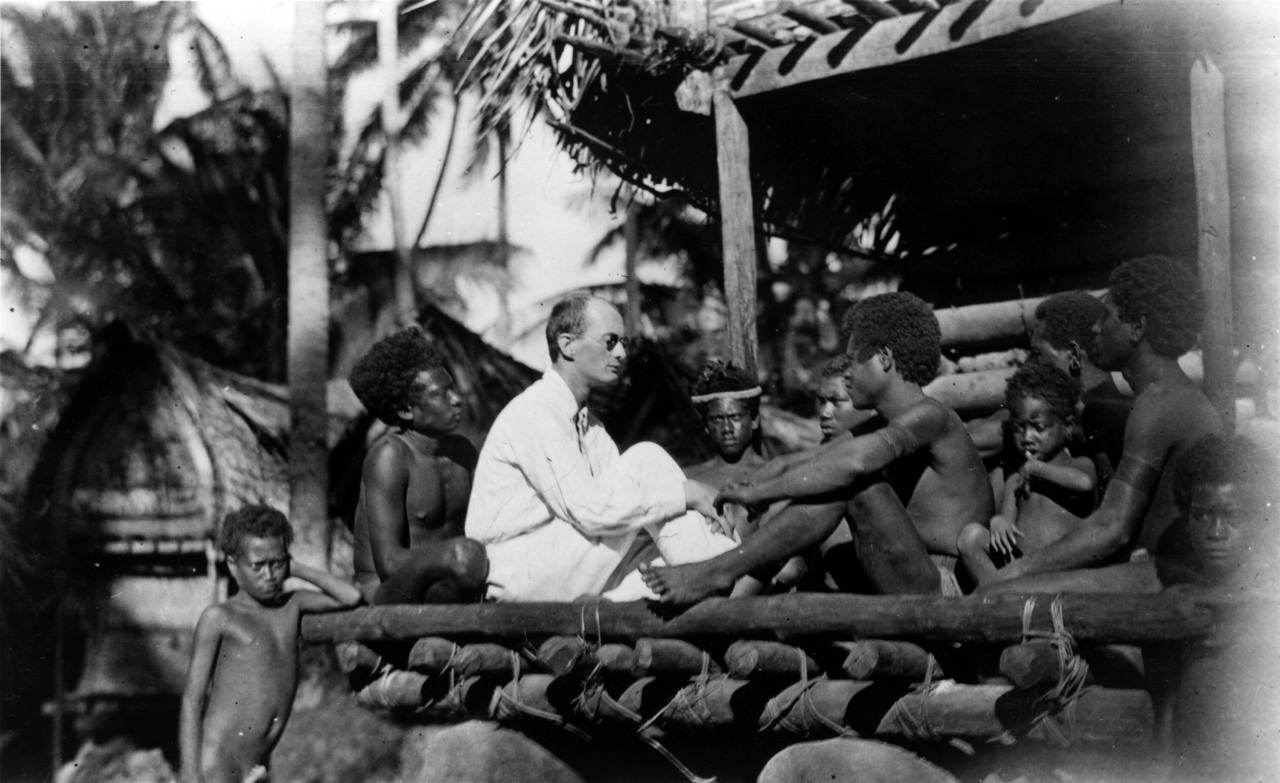
Picture of Bronislaw Malinowski with natives on Trobriand Islands.

Coral Gardens and Their Magic, properly Coral Gardens and Their Magic Volume I: A Study of the Methods of Tilling the Soil and of Agricultural Rites in the Trobriand Islands and Coral Gardens and Their Magic Volume II: The Language of Magic and Gardening, is the final two-volume book in anthropologist Bronisław Malinowski's ethnographic trilogy on the lives of the Trobriand Islanders. It concentrates on the cultivation practices the Trobriand Islanders used to grow yams, taro, bananas and palms which Malinowski's more famous ethnography Argonauts of the Western Pacific briefly mentioned in passing. It describes the gardens in which the Trobrianders grew food as more than merely utilitarian spaces, even as works of art. In 1988 Alfred Gell called the book "still the best account of any primitive technological-cum-magical system, and unlikely ever to be superseded in this respect". The book has been described as Malinowski's magnum opus.

== Overview ==
The book consists of seven parts divided over two volumes. Volume I, The Description of Gardening, contains the introduction and parts one to three, and volume II, The Language of Magic and Gardening, parts four to seven.

- Part One: "Introduction: Tribal economics and social organisation of the Trobrianders"
  This part introduces the climate, industry, and gardening arrangements of the Trobriands and supplies initial anthropological data on the Trobriand Islanders, including by sketching out their social organization and economic institutions.
- Part Two: "Gardens and their magic on a coral atoll"
  This part describes the role of magic in Trobriand gardening, the rites it involves, Trobriand theories of land tenure, and the technology and spaces associated with gardening practices. It also considers the methodological limitations of various approaches to ethnographic fieldwork, especially in relation to terminology.
- Part Three: "Documents and appendices"
  collection of documents, including plans of buildings, lineage and title diagrams, explanations of the calculation of gift obligations, and a set of notes on ethnographic methodology and its limitations.
- Part Four: "An ethnographic theory of language and some practical corollaries"
  This part considers language as a tool, a document, and a cultural reality. It discusses the difficulties of translation and the overlap and boundaries of concepts, and brings context to bear on interpretation, for the anthropologist and for the speakers. It engages with the question of pragmatics, and of the way meaning relates to words
- Part Five: "Corpus inscriptionum agriculturae quiriviniensis; or the language of gardens"
  A linguistic supplement, outlining a vocabulary of Trobriand gardening terminology and magical words.
- Part Six: "An ethnographic theory of the magical word"
  This part advances a theory of magical language, both in the Trobriand case specifically and in general terms. Malinowski argues that Trobriand magic spells, like all forms of language, must be understood in context, as "verbal acts", with a predominantly pragmatic function. Language, including magical language, is intended primarily not to communicate thought, but to bring about practical effects. This theory of a pragmatic function of language as a functional aspect of human behaviour, is an early anthropological contribution to the theory of pragmatics.
- Part Seven: "Magical formulae"
  This section presents some Trobriand magical spells, together with Malinowski's word-by-word analysis.

== Reception ==
The work continues to receive attention from contemporary anthropologists. Its assessment of the Trobriand chief's role as that of a "glorified brother-in-law" to the whole community is one with which later anthropologists have taken issue. It records unusually extensive ethnolinguistic data for of a work of its time, much of it relating to gardening spells that the Trobriand Islanders used, and much of it incompletely analysed; it continues to provide a data source for anthropologists of language. Malinowski was also praised for his serious engagement with the realities of Trobriand agriculture, its emphasis on its ceremonial aspects notwithstanding, in favour of a simpler, romanticized view.

The work is also regarded as a pioneering text in the interdisciplinary study of pragmatics. Its analysis of the context and contents of Trobriand spells was one of the first to bring ethnography to bear on the subject of language.

== Release details ==
In a letter written around February 1929, Malinowski wrote that he was basing the monograph partly upon a draft manuscript on gardening he had written during 1916 and 1917.

The book was published by Routledge in 1935. It has been through several editions, including a 1966 second edition by Allen and Unwin. US editions were published in 1965 and 1978.
