= The Early Writings of Bronislaw Malinowski =

1993 book

The Early Writings of Bronisław Malinowski
- Editor: Robert J. Thornton and Peter Skalník
- Author: Bronisław Malinowski
- Translator: Ludwik Krzyżanowski
- Language: English
- Subject: Ethnology
- Publisher: Cambridge University Press
- Publication date: August 1993
- Pages: 324
- ISBN: 0-521-38300-5

The Early Writings of Bronisław Malinowski is a 1993 anthropological book edited by Robert J. Thornton and Peter Skalník collecting some early short works of Polish anthropologist Bronisław Malinowski, published posthumously. The book contains an introductory section about Malinowski's scholarly influences, namely Friedrich Nietzsche, James George Frazer, and Ernst Mach, as well as analyses on his early intellectual development. Following the introduction, nine of Malinowski's works written from 1904 - 1914 are translated and reproduced:

- "Observations on Friedrich Nietzsche's The Birth of Tragedy" (1904-1905)
- "On the principle of the economy of thought" (1906)
- "Religion and magic: The Golden Bough" (1910)
- "Totemism and exogamy" (1911-1913)
- "Tribal male associations in Australia" (1912)
- "The economic aspects of the intichiuma ceremonies" (1912)
- "The relationship of primitive beliefs to the forms of social organization" (1913)
- "A fundamental problem of religious sociology" (1914)
- "Sociology of the family" (1913-1914)

More widely published contemporaneous works by Malinowski, The Family Among the Australian Aborigines (1913) and Wierzenia pierwotne i formy ustroju spolecznego [Primitive Beliefs and Forms of the Social System] (1915) are not included in this volume. Many of the included works listed above were previously only available in Polish or German, and two were published for the first time in this book.

Thornton and Skalník emphasize the importance of Malinowski's early writings in foregrounding his future scholarship on functionalism, social anthropology, and ethnography. They write:

"These essays are more pieces in several complex puzzles about the European confrontation with the 'Savage', about self-knowledge and the constructions of selves and others, about the adequacy of European philosophy and social science, and many other issues that extend far beyond the field of anthropology alone."

— Robert Thornton and Peter Skalník, The Early Writings of Bronsiław Malinowski, page 2

Eastern European philosophy and culture influence many of these early works, with particular emphases on the works of Émile Durkheim and Marcel Mauss in addition to Nietzsche, Mach, and Frazer.
