= Argonauts of the Western Pacific =

1922 book by Bronisław Malinowski

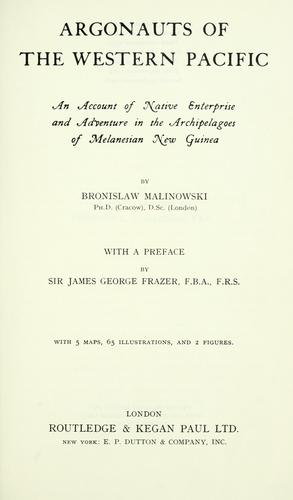
- Cover of the first edition
- Author: Bronisław Malinowski
- Language: English
- Series: Studies in economics and political science, no. 65.
- Subject: Ethnography
- Publisher: London, G. Routledge & Sons; New York, E.P. Dutton & Co.
- Publication date: 1922
- Media type: Print
- OCLC: 647026285
- Followed by: The Sexual Life of Savages in North-Western Melanesia, Coral Gardens and Their Magic

Argonauts of the Western Pacific: An Account of Native Enterprise and Adventure in the Archipelagoes of Melanesian New Guinea is a 1922 ethnography by Bronisław Malinowski, which has had enormous impact on the ethnographic genre. The book is about the Trobriand people who live on the small Kiriwana island chain northeast of the island of New Guinea. It is part of Malinowski's trilogy on the Trobrianders, including The Sexual Life of Savages in North-Western Melanesia (1929) and Coral Gardens and Their Magic (1935).

== Overview ==
The book consists of twenty-two chapters divided into six distinct sections. General summaries of each section are included below.

- Introduction: Malinowski's famous general statement of the aims of ethnography
- Chapters I-III: setting the scene and sketching the structure; from the broad survey of Kula District (I) to intensive fieldwork (II-III); "native" life (II), structural overview of the kula (III)
- Chapters IV-XVI: the kula by example; "a consecutive narrative" from the earliest preparations of canoe-building through extended voyaging from Sinaketa to Dobu and back
- Chapters XVII-XVIII: on magic and language
- Chapters XIX-XXI: three permutations of basic kula pattern: the inland kula (XIX), a Kiriwina-Kitava expedition (XX), and "the remaining branches and offshoots of the kula" (XXI)
- Chapter XXII: a summary statement of "the meaning of the kula"

== Development ==
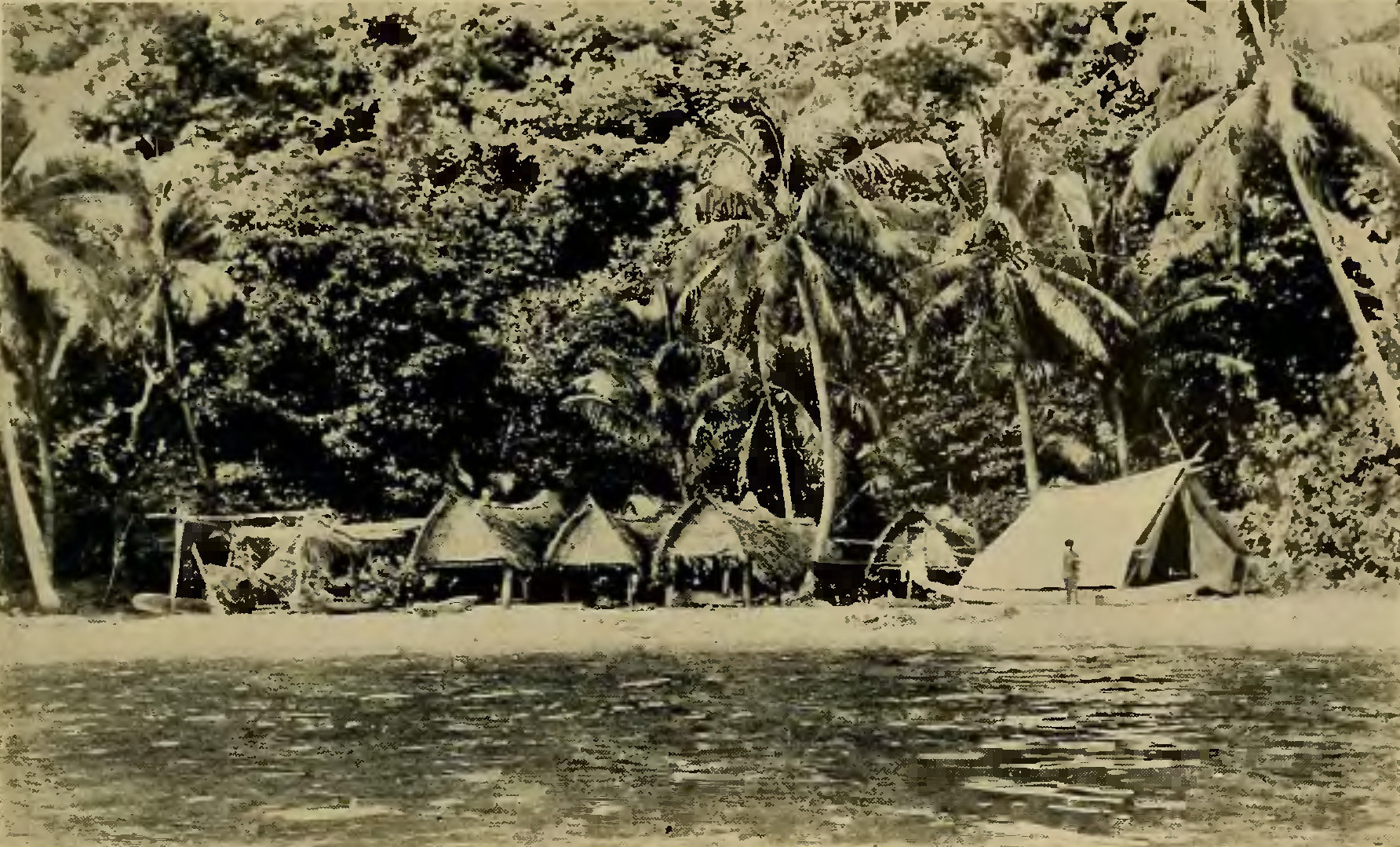
A photo (Plate I) from Malinowski's Argonauts of the Western Pacific (1922), showing the native village as well as Malinowski's tent

Argonauts of the Western Pacific developed from anthropological research which would be later described as "off the verandah". Unlike the armchair anthropology of previous researchers, this method was characterized by participant observation: informal interviews, direct observation, participation in the life of the group, collective discussions, analyses of personal documents produced within the group, self-analysis, results from activities undertaken off or online, and life-histories.

== Impact ==
It was widely regarded as a masterpiece and significantly boosted Malinowski's reputation in the world of academia. It has been described as an "instant classic"; already James George Frazer in his preface to the first edition compared Malinowski's impact on ethnography to that of Shakespeare on literature.

Considered the first moderne ethnography, Argonauts of the Western Pacific redefined the ethnographic genre. Adam Kuper, in his seminal 1973 book on British social anthropology, begins his analysis with Malinowski's status as the founder of the discipline:

Malinowski has a strong claim to being the founder of the profession of social anthropology in Britain, for he established its distinctive apprenticeship – intensive fieldwork in an exotic community.

Many other anthropologists also trace the fieldwork mandate back to Malinowski, including Murray Wax:

In the final analysis, the major credit for discovering the technique of intensive personal fieldwork among a single people must go to Bronislaw Malinowski (1884–1942). His researches among the Trobriand Islanders during the years 1916-18 yielded a series of epochal volumes which revolutionized the content and practice of anthropology.

Today, Argonauts of the Western Pacific is the archetypal account of anthropologists' "following the people" method of collecting information for a multi-sited ethnography.

In the 1980's, a scholar noticed that Malinowski's embarking on the Kula expedition was a fiction reconstructed from his previous experiences. In his 1985 paper, Robert J Thornton demonstrated the influences Frazer's, Ernst Mach's, and Joseph Conrad's textual imaginings had exerted on Malinowski and his famous book.
