= Hortense Powdermaker =

American anthropologist, ethnographer and professor (1896–1970)

- Powdermaker in 1950
- Born: December 24, 1896; Philadelphia, Pennsylvania
- Died: June 16, 1970 (aged 73); Berkeley, California
- Scientific career
- Fields: Anthropology, ethnography
- Academic advisors: Bronisław Malinowski

Hortense Powdermaker (December 24, 1896 – June 16, 1970) was an American anthropologist best known for her ethnographic studies of African Americans in rural America and of Hollywood.

== Early life and education ==
Born to a Jewish family, Powdermaker spent her childhood in Reading, Pennsylvania, and in Baltimore, Maryland. She studied history and the humanities at Goucher College, graduating in 1921. She worked as a labor organizer for the Amalgamated Clothing Workers but became dissatisfied with the prospects of the U.S. labor movement amid the repression of the Palmer Raids. She left the United States to study at the London School of Economics, where she met eminent anthropologist Bronisław Malinowski, who convinced her to embark on a course of doctoral studies. While at the LSE, Powdermaker also worked under and was influenced by other well-known anthropologists such as A. R. Radcliffe-Brown, E. E. Evans-Pritchard and Raymond Firth.

Powdermaker completed her PhD on "leadership in primitive society" in 1928. Like her contemporaries, Powdermaker sought to identify her anthropological work with a "primitive" people and conducted fieldwork among the Lesu of New Ireland in present-day Papua New Guinea (Life in Lesu: The Study of a Melanesian Society in New Ireland. Williams & Norgate, London 1933).

== Academic work ==
After returning to the United States, Powdermaker was given an appointment at the new Rockefeller Foundation-supported Yale Institute of Human Relations. Director Edward Sapir encouraged her to apply ethnographic field methods to the study of communities in her own society. She remained at Yale between 1930 and 1937, during which time she conducted anthropological fieldwork in an African-American community in Indianola, Mississippi, in 1932-34 (After Freedom: A Cultural Study In the Deep South, 1939).

In 1938 she began working at Queens College, where she founded the departments of Anthropology and Sociology during a career spanning three decades. Subsequent research yielded Hollywood, the Dream Factory (1950), the first and still the only substantial anthropological study of the film industry. She then worked documenting the mining industry and the consumption of American media in Northern Rhodesia (Copper Town: Changing Africa, 1962).

Her final book, the memoir Stranger and Friend: The Way of an Anthropologist (1966), was her personal account of her anthropological career, from the beginning as a labor movement leader to her last field work in an African copper mining community.

== Later life and legacy ==
In 1968, Hortense Powdermaker retired from Queens College, where she had founded the department of anthropology and sociology, and moved to Berkeley, where she remained engaged in ethnographic fieldwork. She died two years later of a heart attack.

The building on the Queens College campus that houses the anthropology and sociology departments (along with other social science disciplines) is named in her memory.

== Bibliography ==
Of the many books and articles Hortense Powdermaker wrote during her career, her ethnographies on Northern Rhodesians, Hollywood, and Indianola and her comparison of these and one another ethnography are still recognized today as important works.

=== Deep South ===
Her study of Indianola, Mississippi, published as After Freedom, was one of the first studies of modern American culture by an anthropologist, as well as one of the first academic studies of an interracial community. This study was conducted from 1932 to 1934 and is of particular importance for her having successfully completed participant observation in both white and Black populations, despite the danger involved. This study was the source of her groundbreaking theory focusing on the psychological adaptation undergone by Blacks and whites due to their interracial environment.

=== Hollywood ===
Most people outside of the field of anthropology know of Powdermaker from her study of Hollywood. Hollywood, the Dream Factory, published in 1950 remains the only serious anthropological study of Hollywood.

=== Zambia ===
In order to write Copper Town, Powdermaker had to overcome some difficulties. It has been criticized by many social anthropologists who objected to her use of psychological concepts as well as her lack of "linguistic preparation". Nevertheless, it is an important work regarding the effects of the cinema on African culture presented in an anthropological perspective.

==== Copper Town: Changing Africa ====
This work was published in 1962 in the United States. This book discusses the direct implication that the cinema, or the "bioscope" as it was called by Northern Rhodesians, had on the people who went to it.

The cinema was introduced to Africa by colonial governments in the mid-twentieth century and was perceived to have different influences on the African population depending on the group writing about it. There were numerous studies on the effects of the cinema on African people, Powdermaker's among them. Copper Town: Changing Africa was an ethnographic study of the effects on Northern Rhodesia specifically.

One of the main points of her work was to explain the confusion many Africans experienced when viewing Western films. One was their understanding the concept of acting. Some who attended were confused by the concept of a film being fictional. Powdermaker describes that the concept of acting was not understood for the most part, and as a result whenever an actor "died" in one film and reappeared in another, the lack of continuity was disconcerting.

This was part of a broader issue of censorship of films in Africa. Colonial governments at the time were beginning to censor the films intended for African audiences out of fear that certain content might inspire Africans to challenge the colonial governments. Powdermaker examines the films's content and explains how some of the content was often critiqued by Africans due to cultural differences such as kissing and the use of guns, the misunderstandings of which led to a lack of respect for European officials. This cultural values conflict, in turn, threatened the colonial order who used film censorship as a means of keeping Africans from rising against them.

One of the main conclusions that Powdermaker draws from this conflict of culture between colonial governments and African people is that as long as the European and African relationship was nonexistent, "the resulting ignorance [was] bound to distort communication from movies".

=== Comparisons ===
Stranger and Friend, published in 1966, is a comparison of her four ethnographic studies, providing an insight into her own understanding of her works. This book is held in high regard in the anthropological community for its "insight into the anthropological enterprise".
