= Sex and Repression in Savage Society =

1927 anthropology book by Malinowski

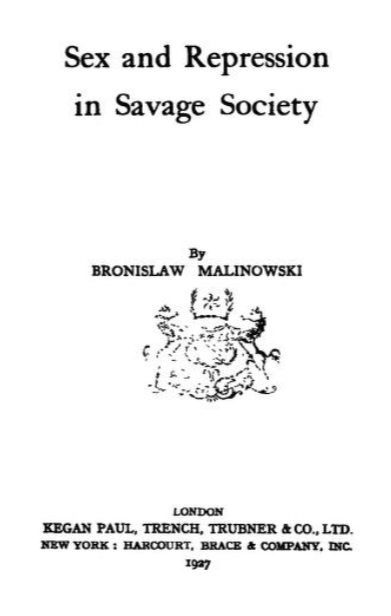
- Title page for Sex and Repression in Savage Society (1927)
- Author: Bronisław Malinowski
- Genre: Non-fiction
- Publication date: 1927

Sex and Repression in Savage Society is a 1927 book by anthropologist Bronisław Malinowski. It is considered "a famous critique of psychoanalysis, arguing that the 'Oedipus complex' described by Freud is not universal." Malinowski gives a partial explanation of the role of sex in social organization through the synthesis of psychoanalysis and anthropology, considered competing academic disciplines at the time. The book is considered an important contribution to psychoanalysis, which Malinowski acknowledged was a "popular craze of the day."

I have never been in any sense a follower of psycho-analytic practice, or an adherent of psycho-analytic theory; and now, while impatient of the exorbitant claims of psycho-analysis, of its chaotic arguments and tangled terminology, I must yet acknowledge a deep sense of indebtedness to it for stimulation as well for valuable instruction in some aspects of human psychology.

The book is divided into four parts. In Part 1 (The Formation of a Complex), he lays out the issues related to childhood sexuality through puberty and maternal roles. In Part 2 (The Mirror of Tradition) he examines myth and taboo related to family dynamics. In Part 3 (Psycho-analysis and Anthropology), he examines the rift between the two disciplines and looks at the role parricide may have as a foundation of culture. In Part 4 (Instinct and Culture), he examines how humans made the transition from animalistic instincts to organized society, situating the family as "the cradle of nascent culture." He describes how taboos that develop within a society must then be enforced through authority and repression.

Malinowski's studies of the Trobriand islanders challenged the Freudian proposal that psychosexual development (e.g. the Oedipus complex) was universal. He reported that in the insular matriarchal society of the Trobriand, boys are disciplined by their maternal uncles, not their fathers; impartial, avuncular discipline. Malinowski reported that boys dreamed of feared uncles, not of beloved fathers, thus, power — not sexual jealousy — is the source of Oedipal conflict in such non–Western societies.

In a brief passage in his 1979 book Broca's Brain, the late science populariser Carl Sagan criticised Malinowski for thinking that "he had discovered a people in the Trobriand Islands who had not worked out the connection between sexual intercourse and childbirth", arguing that it was more likely that the islanders were simply making fun of Malinowski. Mark Mosko wrote in 2014 that further research on Trobriand people affirmed some of Malinowski's claims about their beliefs on procreation, adding that the dogmas are tied to a complicated system of belief encapsulating magic into beliefs about human and plant procreation, but he also stated that "the preponderance of ethnographic evidence ... refutes Malinowski’s notorious claims of Islanders’ supposed “ignorance of physiological paternity”".
