= Crime and Custom in Savage Society =

Crime and Custom in Savage Society is a 1926 book by anthropologist Bronisław Malinowski.

The book is considered a seminal work in legal anthropology, described 75 years after its publication as having major "intellectual influence".
