= Magic, Science and Religion and Other Essays =

1948 book by Bronisław Malinowski

Magic, Science and Religion and Other Essays is a 1948 anthropological book by the Polish scholar Bronisław Malinowski, collecting a number of his essays published in the earlier years.
