= Malinowski: Odyssey of an Anthropologist, 1884–1920 =

Malinowski: Odyssey of an Anthropologist, 1884–1920 is a 2004 book about the early career of Polish-British anthropologist Bronisław Malinowski, written by Michael W. Young and published by Yale University Press. The book is described as Volume I as the author plans to publish a second volume in the future.

The book received nominations for James Tait Black Memorial Prize for Biography and the British Academy Book Prize.
