= Man and Culture =

Book dedicated to life and work of Polish anthropologist

Man and Culture: An Evaluation of the Work of Malinowski is a 1957 book dedicated to the life and work of Polish anthropologist Bronisław Malinowski, edited by Raymond Firth and published by Humanities Press International.
