= The Dynamics of Culture Change =

1945 book by Bronisław Malinowski

The Dynamics of Culture Change: An inquiry into race relations in Africa is a 1945 anthropological book by the Polish scholar Bronisław Malinowski. It was published posthumously, three years after Malinowski's death, and was edited from Malinowski's notes by Phyllis Kaberry.

The book concerns the topic of cultural contact and change, illustrating the theories and methods through the study of specific cases, mostly from South and East Africa.
