= Edith Clarke (anthropologist) =

Jamaican anthropologist and social reformer

- Born: 1896; Westmoreland Parish
- Died: 1979 (aged 82–83)

Academic background
- Education: London School of Economics

Edith Clarke (1896–1979) was a Jamaican anthropologist, administrator, legislator, and advocate for women and children's rights.

== Life ==
Edith Clarke was born in Westmoreland Parish, a member of the Jamaican white elite. She was the daughter of Hugh Clarke, a planter and the custos of Westmoreland parish. An account cited that she was influenced by her grandfather, Henry Clarke, who is noted for his campaign against poverty and social justice in Jamaica.

Clarke was educated at Abbey School in Malvern before studying at University College, London. She undertook postgraduate study in social anthropology under Bronisław Malinowski at the London School of Economics.

== Work ==
Clarke studied family, kinship and social relations in three rural Jamaican communities demonstrated the variety of household arrangements and women's activity as decision makers. This included Orange Grove and Sugartown villages, where she investigated the living conditions of farming families. Like, M.G. Smith's observation, Clarke found that the practical problems inherent in the families of West Indian lower class included instability, low marriage rates, and high illegitimacy rates so that many households were headed by women and were consisted of women. Her sociological studies were later published in 1957 in the book called, My Mother Who Fathered Me.

Clarke became one of historic women in Jamaican representational politics. She was the first woman, along with Una Elizabeth Jacobs, to enter the country's Legislative Council in 1955.

== Publications ==
- 'The Sociological Significance of Ancestor-Worship in Ashanti', Africa, Vol 3, Issue 4 (October 1930), pp. 431–471
- My mother who fathered me: a study of the family in three selected communities in Jamaica. 1957.
