= A Scientific Theory of Culture and Other Essays =

1944 book by Bronisław Malinowski

A Scientific Theory of Culture and Other Essays is a 1944 anthropological book by the Polish scholar Bronisław Malinowski. It was published posthumously, two years after Malinowski's death.

As the name implies, it focuses on Malinowki's view of culture. It also contains a short essay on James Frazer.

Margaret Mead in her review for the American Journal of Sociology noted that "[t]his book ... will serve the great purpose of communicating the concept of culture to others." Wolfgang Köhler writing for Social Research was more critical of the book.
