= Sex, Culture, and Myth =

Sex, Culture, and Myth is a 1962 anthropological book by the Polish scholar Bronisław Malinowski, published posthumously and collecting a number of his essays, articles and other minor writings, published in the earlier years.
