= Myth in Primitive Psychology =

1926 anthropology book by Malinowski

Myth in Primitive Psychology is a 1926 book by anthropologist Bronisław Malinowski.
