= The Natives of Mailu =

1915 book

- Cover of 1988 republished version
- Author: Bronisław Malinowski
- Genre: Anthropology
- Publication date: 1915
- ISBN: 978-0415002493

The Natives of Mailu: Preliminary results of the Robert Mond research work in British New Guinea is a 1915 anthropological book by the Polish scholar Bronisław Malinowski. It was his second book.

The book was originally published in 1915 in the Transactions and Proceedings of the Royal Society of South Australia. It initially didn't garner much academic attention, but was revisited later, as Malinowski became seen as one of the world's leading anthropologists. The book, edited by Michael Young, was republished in 1988 as Malinowski Among the Magi: "The Natives of Mailu".
