= The Sexual Life of Savages in North-Western Melanesia =

Book by Bronisław Malinowski

The Sexual Life of Savages in North-Western Melanesia: An Ethnographic Account of Courtship, Marriage, and Family Life Among the Natives of the Trobriand Islands, British New Guinea
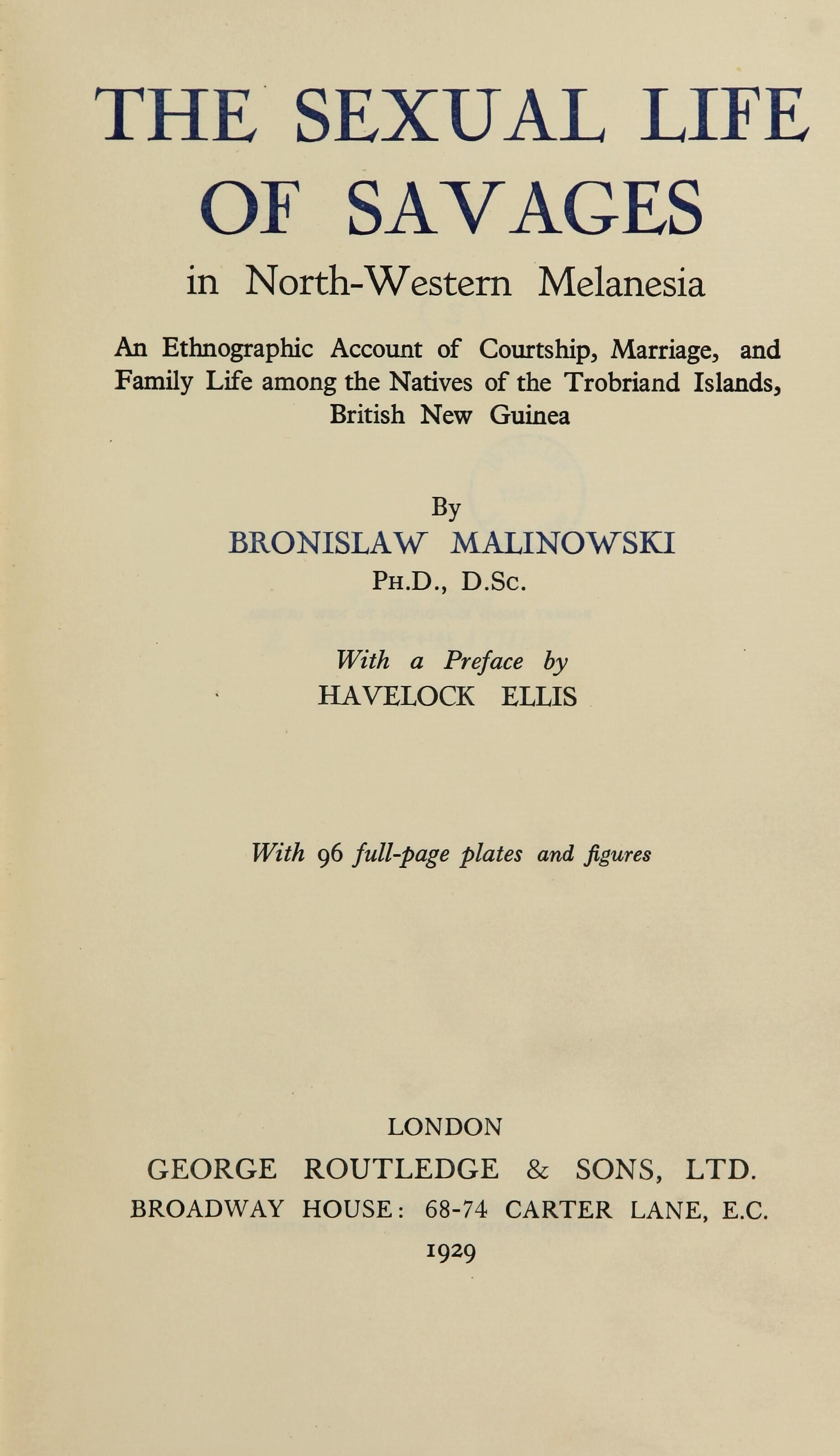
- Title page of the original edition
- Author: Bronisław Malinowski
- Language: English
- Subject: Anthropology
- Publication date: 1929
- Media type: Print

The Sexual Life of Savages in North-Western Melanesia: An Ethnographic Account of Courtship, Marriage, and Family Life Among the Natives of the Trobriand Islands, British New Guinea is a 1929 book by anthropologist Bronisław Malinowski. The work is his second in the trilogy on the Trobrianders, with the other two being Argonauts of the Western Pacific (1922) and Coral Gardens and Their Magic (1935).

== Summary ==
In the preface Malinowski says that sexuality "dominates in fact almost every aspect of culture".

Malinowski gives a detailed description of the social organisation of sexuality (social rites, partner choice, etc.) "tracing the Trobriand lifecycle from birth through puberty, marriage, and death".

Children do not submit to a system of "domestic coercion" or "regular discipline": they "enjoy considerable freedom and independence". The idea of a child's being "beaten or otherwise punished in cold blood" by a parent is viewed as "unnatural and immoral" and when proposed by the anthropologist is "rejected with some resentment". Requests are made "as from one equal to another; a simple command, implying the expectation of natural obedience, is never heard from parent to child in the Trobriands". Within a family, for a person to strike another "in an outburst of rage" sometimes happens, but a child strikes their parent as often as a parent does their child.

In later chapters, the parent–child relationship of the Trobrianders is described with details of their complex matrilineal relationship structure, in which the biological paternity is ignored.

From ethnographic data, Malinowski argues that the Freudian Oedipus complex is not universal.

== Analysis ==
The book discussed sexuality in matrilineal society, debunking some myths about sexual promiscuity of primitive people. It has also contributed to scientific study of sex, previously restricted due to Euro-American prudery and views on morality; something that has been attributed to Malinowski's Slavic Catholic cultural background which made him less concerned with "Anglo-Saxon Puritanism".

== Reception ==
While the book is a scholarly study, upon its publication its provocative title and contents have been said to "provide enough erotic titillation for booksellers to keep it under the counter wrapped in cellophane."

Malinowski's argument that the Oedipus complex is not universal has been questioned by Ernest Jones, and later by the anthropologist Melford E. Spiro in his book Oedipus in the Trobriands (1982).

== See also ==
- Coming of Age in Samoa
- The Sex Lives of Cannibals
