= The Family Among the Australian Aborigines =

1913 book by Bronisław Malinowski

The Family Among the Australian Aborigines: A Sociological Study
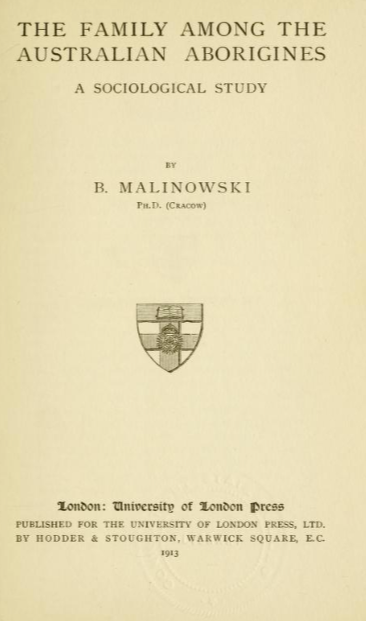
- Title page for The Family Among the Australian Aborigines: A Sociological Study (1913)
- Author: Bronisław Malinowski
- Genre: Non-fiction
- Publication date: 1913

The Family Among the Australian Aborigines: A Sociological Study is a 1913 anthropological book by the Polish scholar Bronisław Malinowski.

The book was based on materials Malinowski collected and wrote in the years 1909–1911. It was well received not just by contemporary reviewers, but also by scholars generations later. In 1963, in his foreword to its new edition, John Arundel Barnes called it an epochal work, and noted how it discredited the previously held theory that Australian Aborigines have no institution of family.
