= Baloma =

Spirit of the dead in Trobriand

Baloma is the spirit of the dead in Trobriand society, as studied by Bronislaw Malinowski in the early 20th century, who published an article on it in 1916 (Baloma; the Spirits of the Dead in the Trobriand Islands in The Journal of the Royal Anthropological Institute of Great Britain and Ireland).

It plays a key role in conception ideologies and explains and maintains the matrilineal descent system by substituting the role of male sperm ("fathers") with that of a spirit. The baloma is that spirit of a deceased lineage member which impregnates the women while bathing in the sea, perpetuating the matrilineage intragenerationally. The role of sexual intercourse is only indirectly related to conception within Trobriand mentality and seen as a way of opening the path for the baloma to enter the woman's womb.
