= James Boon =

American anthropologist (1946-)

James A. Boon is professor emeritus of anthropology at Princeton University. He was a student of James Lowe Peacock.
