= Center for Cultural Studies at UC Santa Cruz =

The Center for Cultural Studies is a research center at the University of California, Santa Cruz. Founded in 1988, the Center encourages a broad range of research in Cultural studies, particularly across disciplinary boundaries. The Center's activities include a Resident Scholars program, research clusters, conferences, lectures and colloquia.

== 2009 advisory board ==
- James Clifford
- Christopher Connery
- Susan Gillman
- Donna Haraway
- James McCloskey
- Lisa Rofel
- Anna Tsing
- Vanita Seth
- Carla Freccero, Director
