= David Bidney =

American anthropologist (1908–1987)

David Bidney (1908–1987) was an American anthropologist and philosopher associated with the Indiana University.

In 1950, he received a Guggenheim Fellowship in anthropology and cultural studies.
