= Leopold Pospisil =

American anthropologist (1923–2021)

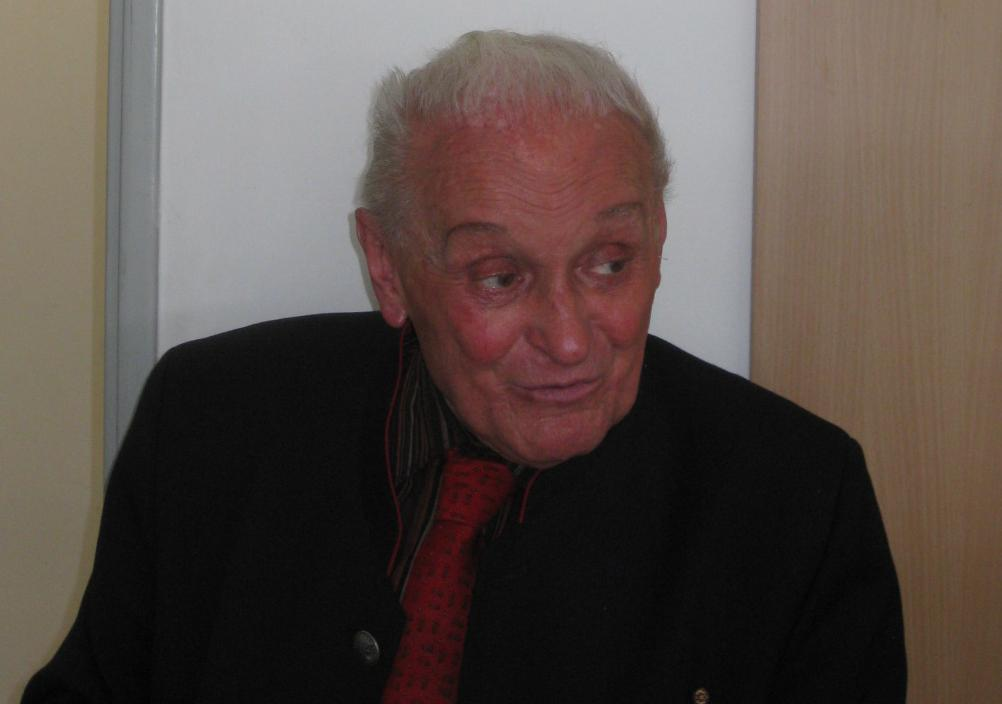
- Pospisil in 2011
- Born: Leopold Jaroslav Pospisil; 26 April 1923; Olomouc, Czechoslovakia
- Died: 25 October 2021 (aged 98); New Haven, Connecticut, US
- Education: Charles University; Willamette University; University of Oregon; Yale University
- Scientific career
- Fields: Legal anthropology, anthropology

Leopold Jaroslav Pospisil (April 26, 1923 – October 25, 2021) was a Czech-born American anthropologist, best known for his work on the anthropology of law.

== Early life and education ==
Pospisil was born in Olomouc in Czechoslovakia (now the Czech Republic). His father, Leopold Pospíšil, was a lawyer, and his mother, Ludmila Petrláková, was a painter. In 1948, Pospisil graduated from Charles University in Prague with a doctorate in law. He briefly practiced law in Prague, but after the communists took over Czechoslovakia, Pospisil was forced to leave the country. He emigrated to the U.S. in 1949. Pospisil received a B.A. in sociology from Willamette University, an M.A. in anthropology from the University of Oregon, and a Ph.D. in anthropology from Yale University in 1956.

== Research ==
For most of Pospisil's career, he taught at Yale. Pospisil did fieldwork among the Kapauku Papuans, the Hopi-Tewa Indians, the Eskimos of Nunamiut in Alaska, and the Tiroleans of Austria. Daniel Strouthes called Pospisil's study of the Tiroleans, “the most detailed anthropological publication I have ever seen.”

Pospisil's legal background led him to study comparative legal systems. In three books, Kapauku Papuans and Their Law, Kapauku Papuan Economy, and The Kapauku Papuans of West New Guinea, Pospisil explored the legal system of the Kapauku Papuans, and how their law changed as their society modernized. In Pospisil's book Anthropology of Law, Pospisil wrote, “anthropology of law is a science of law and therefore empirical.” Rebecca French, a legal anthropologist who was one of Pospisil's former students, wrote,

"To record the legal system, he focuses on instances of trouble and conflict inside the culture, classifying those involving internal decision–making as legal cases. These are recorded, categorized at the fieldsite and then discussed with local informants to abstract the main principles— substantive procedural and moral—which can be garnered from these legal decisions.… These principles are then rechecked with the informants in a continuous feedback process aimed at creating an accurate portrayal of the legal system from inside."

In recognition of Pospisil's research, Pospisil was elected as a member of the National Academy of Sciences, and as a Fellow of the American Association for the Advancement of Science.

== Publications ==
- 1958 With Irving Rouse. Kapauku Papuans and Their Law. Yale University Publications in Anthropology, No. 54. Whitefish, Mt.: Literary Licensing LLC.
- 1963 Kapauku Papuan Economy. Yale University Publications in Anthropology, No. 67. New Haven: Yale University Press.
- The Kapauku Papuans of West New Guinea. New York: Holt, Rinehart, and Winston.
- 1964 Law and societal structure among the Nunamiut Eskimo. In: Exploration in Cultural Anthropology: Essays in Honor of George Peter Murdock, ed. W. Goodenough, pp. 395–431. New York, McGraw-Hill.
- 1965 A formal analysis of substantive law: Kapauku Papuan laws of inheritance. Am. Anthropol. 67(6, part 2):166–185.
- A formal analysis of substantive law: Kapauku Papuan land tenure. Am. Anthropol. 67(5, part 2):185–214.
- 1967 Legal levels and multiplicity of legal systems in human societies. J. Conflict Resol. 11(1):2–26.
- 1971 Anthropology of Law: A Comparative Theory. New York: Harper & Row.
- 1972 The Ethnology of Law. McCaleb Module in Anthropology No. 12. Boston: Addison-Wesley Publishing.
- 1976 With Derek De Solla Price. Kapauku numeration. Journal of the Polynesian Society, 271–272.
- 1979 Legally induced change in New Guinea. In: The Imposition of Law, eds. S. B. Burman and B. E. Harrell-Bond, pp. 127–146. New York: Academic Press.
- 1980 Law versus morality: A solution to the problem of the Australian eight-class marriage system. In: Entstehung und Wandel rechtlicher Traditionen, eds. W. Fikentscher, H. Franke, and O. Kohler, pp. 235–263. Freiburg, Munich: C. H. Beckischer Verlag.
- A dynamic view of law. Rev. Anthropol. 7(2):235–248.
- 1982 Anthropologie des Rechts: Recht und Gesellschaft in archaischen und modernen Kulturen. Munich: Beck.
- Obernberg: A Quantitative Analysis of a Peasant Tirolean Economy. Memoirs of the Connecticut Academy of Arts & Sciences, Vol. 24. New Haven, Conn.: Connecticut Academy of Sciences.
- Law equals Ius and Lex: The major problem of Anglo-Saxon theories of law. Acta Universitatis Carolinae-Philosophia et Historica Studia Ethnographica 49–56.
- 2004 Sociocultural Anthropology. Boston: Pearson Custom Publishing.
- 2021 Adventures in the 'Stone Age': A New Guinea Diary. Ed. J. Jiřík. Prague: Karolinum Press.
