= Valetta Swann =

British painter (1904–1973)

- Born: Anna Valetta Hayman-Joyce; 1904; Eastbourne, Sussex, England
- Died: 1973 (aged 68–69); Mexico City, Mexico
- Education: Warwick Art School; Central Art School
- Occupations: Painter; Sculptor
- Spouses: Edric Swann; Bronisław Malinowski

Anna Valetta Hayman-Joyce (1904 – 1973) was an English painter and sculptor, known for her work related to rural and indigenous life in Mexico and the United States. She began her art career in Europe, but moved to the United States with her husband, anthropologist Bronisław Malinowski. Swann collaborated with him on drawings and photographs of indigenous life there and in Mexico. Malinowski died in 1942, and Swann decided to live permanently in Mexico City, having her first individual exhibition at the Palacio de Bellas Artes in 1945. She had more than fifty individual exhibitions of her work in Mexico, the United States and Europe and her work was recognized with membership in Mexico's Salón de la Plástica Mexicana.

== Life ==
Anna Valetta Hayman-Joyce was born in Eastbourne, Sussex, in 1904. Since her early childhood, she showed interest and talent in drawing and painting but had to struggle against a mother who was opposed to her vocation. In 1920, she succeeded in taking formal painting lessons with a teacher named Helen Urquhart, then continued at a local art school in 1927, when she married her first husband, Edric Swann. She lived with him in London, where she attended the Warwick Art School and later the Central Art School.

In 1930, she separated from Swann and abandoned painting for two and a half years, resuming again in 1933. In the mid-1930s she travelled in Europe and eventually met her second husband, noted Polish anthropologist Bronislaw Malinowski. In 1939, the couple moved to the United States where he was invited to teach at Yale University. His research took them to indigenous regions of the United States and Mexico, and Swann collaborated on projects such as studying the market systems of Oaxaca, contributing drawings and photographs to her husband's text. Malinowski died in 1942, and Swann then settled permanently in Mexico City.

Swann died in this city in 1973, leaving many of Malinowski's papers in her possession to his three daughters from a first marriage.

== Career ==
Swann began exhibiting her work in Europe in the 1930s, especially in the Wertheim Gallery in London and the Zak Gallery in Paris. Her first exhibition in Mexico was at the Palacio de Bellas Artes in 1945, where it received very favorable attention. During her career, she had more than fifty individual exhibitions in Mexico, the United States and Europe. She also participated in collective exhibitions such as the 12 painters from Mexico at the Velentin Gallery in Zurich.

She created several portable murals such as Cosmic Symphony in 1960 and The Delights in 1964. She also created bronze sculptures such as Woman's Torso in 1960.

Swann's work was recognized with membership in Mexico's Salón de la Plástica Mexicana.

== Artistry ==
Swann is best known for her depictions of rural and indigenous life in Mexico, which she found to be a strong source of inspiration, linking their traditional values with her pictorial ones. Carlos Pellicer called her work a "case of spiritual fusion" and claimed that she "discovered Mexico’s indigenous soul".

Her work was well received in Mexico. For her first exhibit in Mexico, Diego Rivera wrote: "The use of divided color that she brings about with insight and sensitivity is one of the qualities in her work that she should strive to retain." In 1950, Dr Atl noted about Swann: "This artist is essentially a luminist, because she paints with light, not in the manner of the Pointillists or the Futurists, but rather according to her own understanding, by creating genuine vibratory sensations in the spectator."

== Murals ==
- Sinfonía cósmica (1960) (English:"Cosmic Symphony"), mural, private collection, Mexico
- Las delicias (1964), mural, National Museum of Anthropology, Mexico City, Mexico
