= Michael W. Young (anthropologist) =

British anthropologist

Michael W. Young (born 1937) is a British anthropologist. His research includes works on Papua New Guinea and history of anthropology.

He lectured at Cambridge University (assistant lecturer, 1970–74) and later at the Australian National University, Canberra (fellow, 1974–83, senior fellow in anthropology, 1983–98, visiting fellow, 1999).

His 2004 book Malinowski: Odyssey of an Anthropologist, 1884–1920 received nominations for the James Tait Black Memorial Prize for Biography and the British Academy Book Prize.
