= Trobriand people =

Ethnic group in Papua New Guinea

The people of the Trobriand Islands are mostly subsistence horticulturalists who live in traditional settlements. Their social structure is based on matrilineal clans that control land and resources. Yams and pigs are valued as currency and represent wealth and power. People participate in the regional circuit of exchange of shells called kula, sailing to visit trade partners on seagoing canoes.

In the late 20th century, anti-colonial and cultural autonomy movements gained followers from the Trobriand societies. When colonial rulers forbade inter-group warfare, the islanders developed a unique, aggressive form of cricket.

== Language ==
The Trobriand peoples speak Kilivila, though different dialects are spoken in different tribes. It is an Austronesian language with a complex system of classifying nouns. Foreign languages are less commonly spoken, although by the 1980s, Trobrianders occasionally spoke Tok Pisin and English. The term "Trobriand" itself is not Kilivilan: the islands take this name from the French explorer Jean François Sylvestre Denis de Trobriand who visited in 1793.

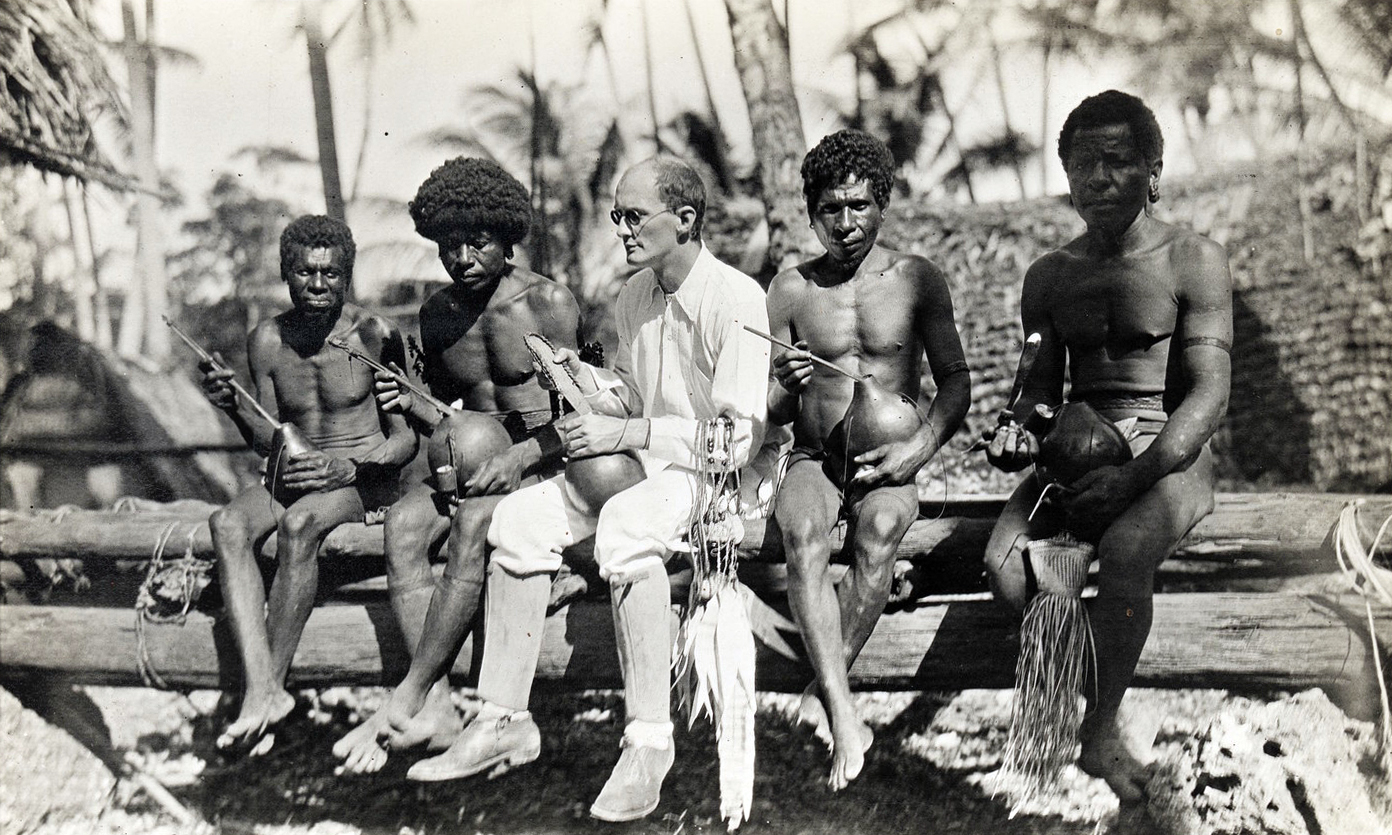
Malinowski in the Trobriands

Drawing upon earlier work by Bronisław Malinowski, Dorothy D. Lee's scholarly writings refer to "non-lineal codifications of reality". In such a linguistic system, the concept of linear progress of time, geometric shapes, and even conventional methods of description are lost or altered. Lee gives the example of a specific indigenous yam. As the yam moves from sprouting through ripeness to overripeness, the name for it in each state changes entirely: the description of the object at different states of development relates to wholly different perceptions of the object. Ripeness is considered a "defining ingredient", and so when it becomes overripe, a yam is perceived as a new object altogether. The same is true of time and geometric shapes.

== Food ==
In Trobriand society, it is taboo to eat in front of others. Jennifer Shute writes, "Trobrianders eat alone, retiring to their own hearths with their portions, turning their backs on one another and eating rapidly for fear of being observed." But it is perfectly acceptable to chew betel nuts, particularly when mixed with some pepper plant and slaked lime to make the nut less bitter. The betel nut acts as a stimulant and is commonly used by Trobrianders, causing their teeth to often appear red. Because in the past food was often scarce, to boast of having food is one of the Trobriand Islanders' chief glories and ambitions. Though food is most important, and the subject of food is most discussed, at Miamala, the annual time of harvest and feasting, the islanders can face hunger and scarcity due to poor growing conditions at any time of year. In 2009, the problem of population pressure, leading to food insecurity, received much national and international media attention.

== Marriage customs ==
Trobriand children as young as six play erotic games with each other and imitate adult seductive attitudes. Around age 13, they begin to pursue sexual partners. They change partners often. Women are just as assertive and dominant as men in pursuing or refusing a lover. This is not only allowed, but encouraged.

In the Trobriand Islands, there is no traditional marriage ceremony. A woman stays in her lover's house instead of leaving it before sunrise. The man and woman sit together in the morning and wait for the bride's mother to bring them cooked yams. The couple eat together for about a year, and then go back to eating separately. Once the man and woman eat together, the marriage is officially recognized.

When a Trobriand couple want to marry, they show their interest by sleeping together, spending time together, and staying with each other for several weeks. The girl's parents approve of the couple when a girl accepts a gift from a boy. After that, the girl moves to the boy's house, eats her meals there, and accompanies her husband all day. Then word goes out that the two are married.

A married couple may get divorced after a year if the woman is unhappy with her husband or if the husband chooses another woman. The man may try to go back to the woman he left by giving her family yams and other gifts, but it is up to the woman whether she wants to be with him.

Although reproduction and modern medicine is widely understood in Trobriand society, their traditional beliefs have been remarkably resilient. For example, the real cause of pregnancy is believed to be a baloma, or ancestral spirit, that enters the body of a woman, and without which a woman cannot become pregnant. In the past, many held this traditional belief because the yam, a major food of the island, included chemicals (phytoestrogens and plant sterols) whose effects are contraceptive, so the practical link between sex and pregnancy was not very evident.

== Magic ==
Trobriands believe that conception is the result of an ancestral spirit entering the woman's body. Even after a child is born, it is the mother's brother, not the father, who presents a harvest of yams to his sister so that her child will be fed with food from its own matrilineage, not the father's.

The Trobrianders practice many traditional magic spells. Young people learn spells from older kin in exchange for food, tobacco, and money. Spells are often partially or fully lost because the old people give away only a few lines at a time to keep getting gifts. Often, the old person dies before they finish passing on the spells. Trobrianders believe that no one can make up a new magic spell.

Sometimes, a man gives a woman magic spells because he wants to give her more than betel nuts or tobacco. People also buy and sell spells. Literate villagers write their magic spells in books and hide them. A person may direct magic spells toward heightening the visual and olfactory effects of their body to induce erotic feelings in their lover. Some spells are thought to make a person beautiful, even those who would normally be considered ugly. The beauty magic words are chanted into coconut oil, and then a person rubs it onto their skin, or into flowers and herbs that decorate their armbands and hair.

== Cricket ==
After tribal conflict was banned, cricket replaced war in the Trobriand culture. The colonial powers were appalled by the violence and sexual displays associated with tribal warfare. Matches are often played between all-male teams and last several months. There are often feasts for the winning team. The islanders add elements to cricket that reflect their culture. For example, since the sport resembles war, there is no limit on team size. Also, every time a team scores a special dance ritual is performed. These dances are an adaptation of former war rituals and often contain taunts and jeers at the other team. "The words are sexual metaphors, used as one team taunts the other and exhibits their physical and sexual prowess to the appraising eyes of the young women on the sidelines."

Trobriandian cricket strategy can incorporate magic. Teams use charms and incantations to gain an advantage. For example, a spell can be used to make a team less efficient in scoring. A team is expected to lose when visiting a rival island. When a visiting team wins, there are often reports of vandalism and arson. During such events, yam houses are burned, which is considered a major insult. In essence, this form of cricket is more aggressive and an important part of Trobriand life.

== Currency ==
Trobrianders use yams as currency, and consider them a symbol of wealth and power. Western visitors often buy items from Trobrianders with money. There is also a Kula exchange, a very important tradition in the Trobriand Islands. The women also use bundles of scored banana leaves.

=== Yam exchanges ===
Each year, a man grows yams for his sister, and his daughter if she is married. The husband does not provide yams to his wife. The more yams a woman receives, the more powerful and rich she is. The husband is expected to give his wife's father or brother a gift in turn for the yams they give his wife. When the woman is first married, she receives yams from her father until the woman's brother thinks his sister and her husband are old enough for him to give the yams.

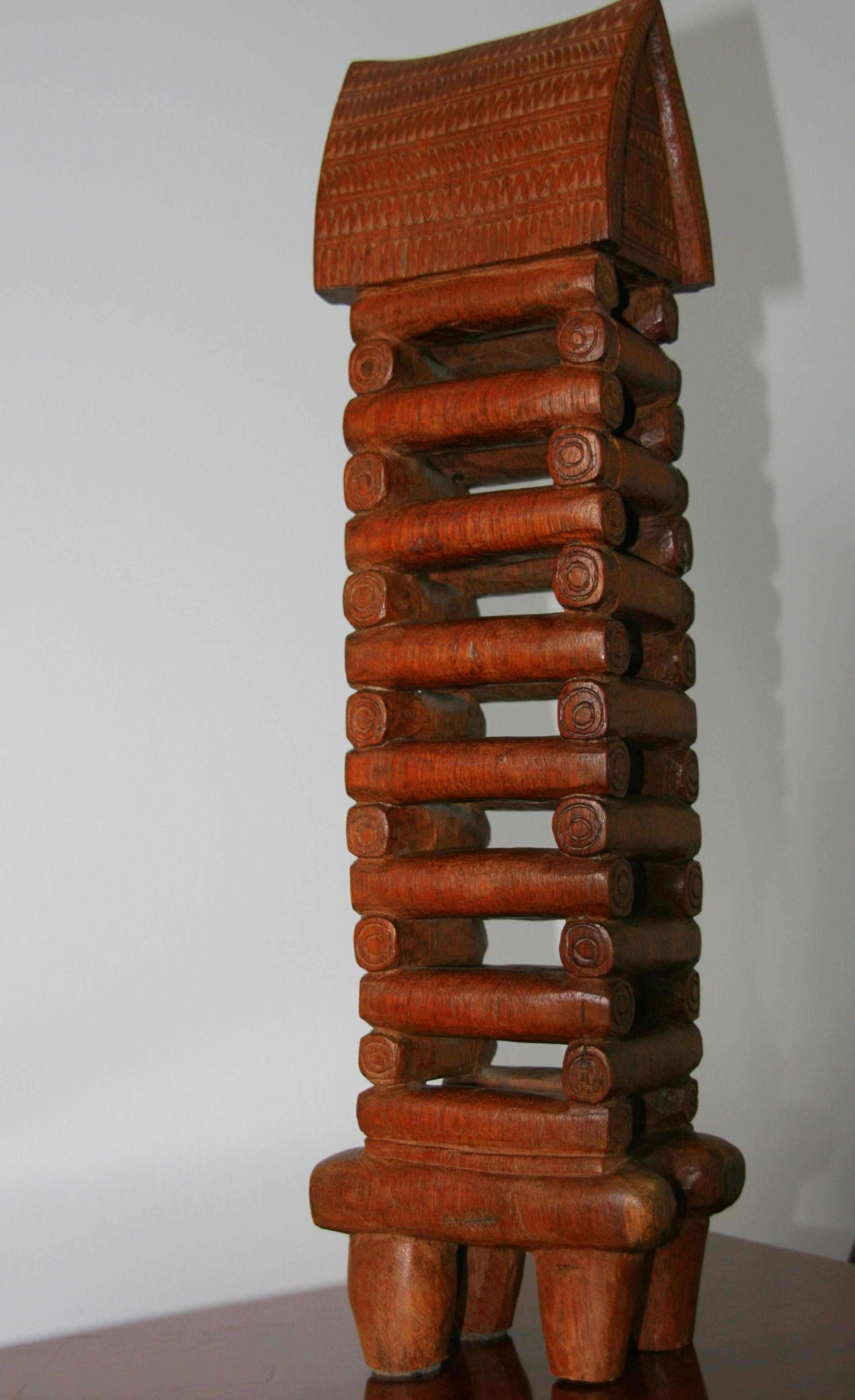
Wood carving of a traditional yam store in the Trobriand Islands

At the beginning of the yam harvest, the yams stay on display in gardens for about a month before the gardener takes them to the owner. The owner is always a woman. There is a ceremony for this. The yams are loaded into the woman's husband's empty yam house. Young people come to the gardens dressed in their most festive traditional clothes early on the day the yams are delivered to the yam house. The young people are all related to the gardener, and carry the yam baskets to the owner's hamlet. When they arrive, they sing out to announce the yams' arrival while thrusting out their hips in a sexually provocative way. This emphasizes the relation between yams and sexuality. A few days later, the gardener comes and loads the yam house, and the man is now responsible for the yam.

The yam house owner gives the gardener and young people cooked yams, taro, and pork. Sometimes no pig is killed, perhaps because the yam house owner did not have one to spare. The yam house owner also may decide not kill a pig for the gardener because he is unsatisfied with the number of yams, or is angry with the gardener for another reason. Once the yam houses are full, a man performs a special spell for the hamlet to ward off hunger by making people feel full. The women also use bundles of scored banana leaves as a type of currency among themselves. As many days of work are required to make the bundles, each one has an assigned value and can be used to buy canned food, or exchanged for other goods.

== Death ==
When a person dies, mourning lasts months. The spouse is joined in mourning by female kin and the dead person's father's sisters. They stay in the house and cry four times a day. If someone who did not attend the funeral comes to the village, they must immediately join in the mourning. Other workers observe many of the mourning taboos. Most shave their heads. People closely related to the deceased avoid eating "good food." Those more distantly related may wear black clothes. Before this, everyone is paid by the owners for their parts in the burial process.

The first set of exchanges takes place the day after burial and involves yams, taro, and small amounts of money. The spouse, the spouse's matrilineage, the dead person's father or father's representative, and members of his matrilineage get the largest distribution.

== Missionisation ==
'Missionisation' has had a mixed effect on daily Trobriand life. Most of the islanders adhere to native tribal traditions. In an attempt to counter this, missionaries who are experienced with animist tribes are sometimes sent. Such missionaries may, for example, try to insert Christian blessings in traditional funeral ceremonies.
