= James Clifford (historian) =

American interdisciplinary scholar

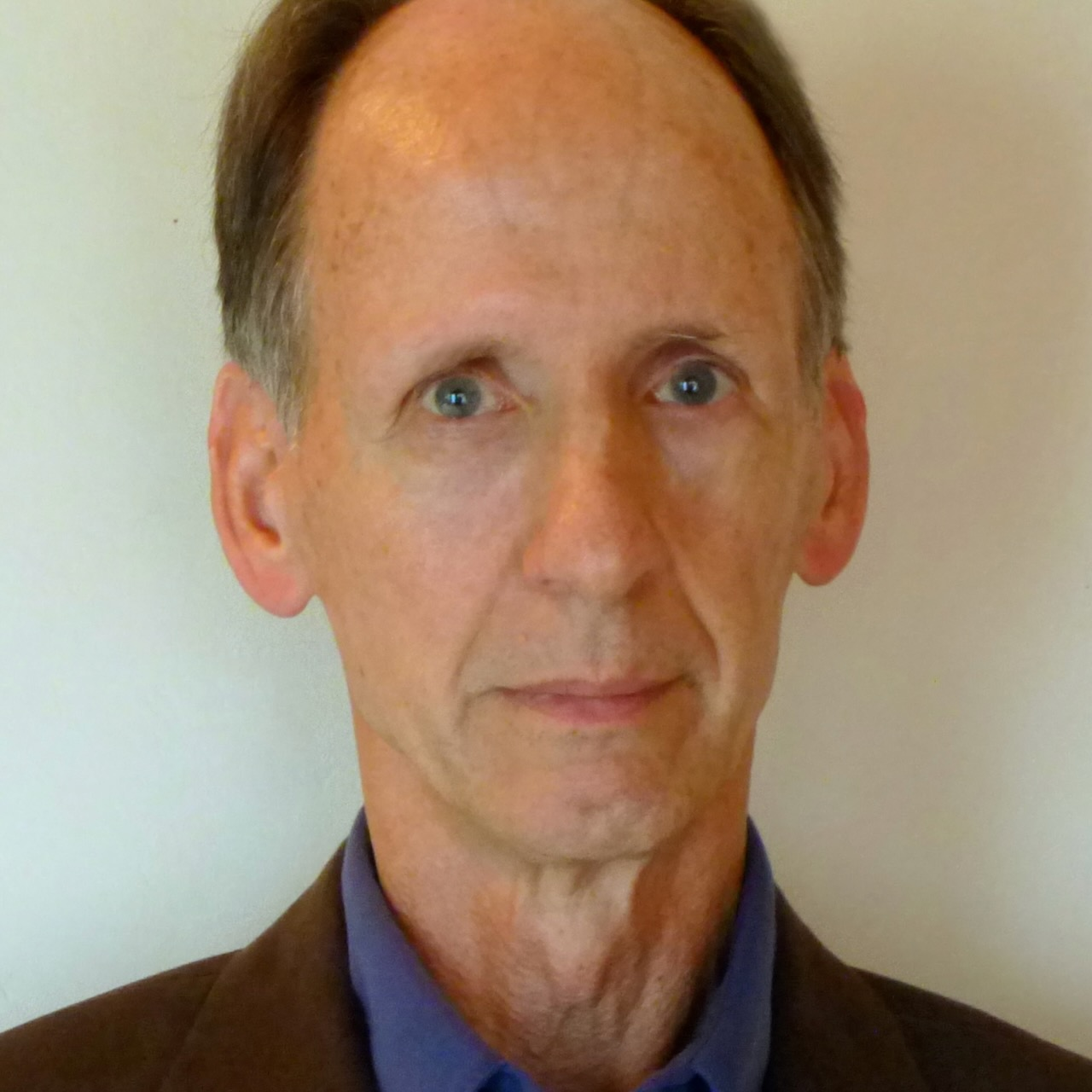
James Clifford

James Clifford (born 1945) is an interdisciplinary scholar whose work combines perspectives from history, literature, and anthropology.

== Biography ==
He grew up in New York City and Vermont. James Clifford's completed his PhD at Harvard University in 1977, focusing European intellectual and social history. His dissertation, later turned into his first book Person and Myth (1982), was a study of the missionary-anthropologist Maurice Leenhardt and the colonial history of New Caledonia in French Melanesia. Clifford's work has since addressed current problems in Indigenous studies, museum studies, cultural studies, and cross-cultural translation.

James Clifford is the author of several books, including The Predicament of Culture: Twentieth-Century Ethnography, Literature, and Art (1988), Routes: Travel and Translation in the Late 20th Century (1997), and Returns: Becoming Indigenous in the Twenty First Century (2013). He was co-editor (with George Marcus) of the influential collection Writing Culture: the Poetics and Politics of Ethnography (1986). His historical and rhetorical critiques of ethnography contributed to anthropology's self-critical, decolonizing period of the 1980s and early 1990s. Since then he has worked in a cultural studies framework that combines cross-cultural scholarship with the Birmingham School tradition. Since 2000 his writing has focused on processes of globalization and decolonization as they influence contemporary Indigenous lives.

In 1978, he became a professor in the History of Consciousness Department at the University of California, Santa Cruz, teaching there until his retirement in 2011. Clifford served as department chair from 2004–2007, and was the founding director of UCSC's Center for Cultural Studies. He has been a visiting professor in France, England, and Germany, and was elected to the American Academy of Arts and Sciences in 2011.

== Published works ==
- Person and Myth: Maurice Leenhardt in the Melanesian World (University of California Press, 1982)
- Writing Culture: the Poetics and Politics of Ethnography, edited with George Marcus (University of California Press, 1986)
- The Predicament of Culture: Twentieth-Century Ethnography, Literature, and Art (Harvard University Press, 1988)
- Traveling Theories, Traveling Theorists, edited with Vivek Dhareshwar (Inscriptions 5, 1989)
- Routes: Travel and Translation in the Late Twentieth Century (Harvard University Press, 1997)
- On the Edges of Anthropology (Prickly Paradigm Press, 2003)
- Returns: Becoming Indigenous in the Twenty First Century (Harvard University Press, 2013)
