= Leslie Scott (archaeologist) =

British archaeologist (1913–1970)

Leslie Scott (28 May 1913–24 January 1970) (Note: Some sources give her year of birth as 1914.) was a British archaeologist. She worked with Mortimer Wheeler on many of his excavations, before directing her own digs in the UK and in France. She was a member of the Royal Archaeological Institute and a Fellow of the Society of Antiquaries of London. She was born Margaret Eleonore McNair Scott, commonly known as Leslie rather than Margaret; her married name was Margaret Eleonore Murray Threipland. (Note: Scott was known by several names over her career. In some sources her given/common names are spelled differently (e.g., Leslie, Lesley, Eleanor, Eleonore). Her married surname, the unhyphenated double-barrelled surname Murray Threipland, is sometimes mistakenly hyphenated, sometimes incorrectly given as simply Threipland, and sometimes misspelled as Thriepland.)

== Archaeological career ==
Scott undertook a degree at University College, London, and studied there under Mortimer Wheeler. She was proposed to membership of the Royal Archaeological Institute by Wheeler on 1 November 1933. She received her academic diploma in archaeology in 1935.

Scott worked with Eliot Cecil Curwen at Whitehawk Camp in 1935, the summer following her graduation. She was closely involved in several of Mortimer Wheeler's archaeological field projects, at Verulamium, Maiden Castle, then the preliminary survey for his work at Quimper and Belle Ile in Brittany and Normandy, as well directing the excavation sites during the two campaigns in France. She also supervised the excavations of the Roman villa at Angmering in 1937 and 1938. The Angmering excavation was funded by playwright and screenwriter R. C. Sherriff; (Note: Sherriff's 1955 play The Long Sunset was inspired by his time excavating at Angmering Roman villa.) it has been noted that Sherriff found Scott agreeable "while virtually removing her from the otherwise lengthy account of the excavations in his autobiography." She took part in the excavations at the site of Lachish in Mandatory Palestine (now part of Israel) at some time in the 1930s, pre 9 October 1938 (her marriage) as her name is listed as Miss L. McNair Scott.

During World War 2 Scott worked in air photographic intelligence. After the war she excavated in southern Etruria, just to the north of Rome, working closely with John Ward-Perkins, the director of the British School at Rome. She later worked in Dover, Wales (including the Roman fortress site of Caerleon) and Cornwall. In the 1960s she worked in Etruria again, this time at the ancient Etruscan city of Veii.

== Personal life ==
Scott was born in Scotland in 1913, the sixth and youngest child of Robert Frederick McNair Scott and Alice Eliza Nystrom. She was an acknowledged beauty. Nigel Nicolson was present at the summer 1938 dig season at Angmering, and wrote of Scott:

She was not only competent but devastatingly attractive. Wheeler, whose visits to the site were more frequent than was strictly necessary, was obviously in love with her, and soon most of us were too. We spent memorable evenings with them in the local pubs, he acting Odysseus, she Nausicaa.

In 1937 Scott was in a relationship with anthropologist Edmund Leach; in late summer 1938 he arranged to undertake fieldwork in Kurdish Iraq in the hope that he would be in the country at the same time that Scott was working on a dig there. On 14 September 1938 while in Kurdistan he received a telegram from Scott saying she was "marrying Peter suddenly". He wrote to another of his close friends, Rosemary Firth, "it's a terrible shock for me – she had finally convinced me before I left England that she was going to marry me." In early October 1938 Leach applied for a wedding licence at Kensington Register Office, London, to marry Scott; later that same day Scott applied at the same register office for one to marry Patrick Wyndham Murray Threipland of Llanishen, Cardiff.

On 9 October 1938 Scott married Murray Threipland at Kensington Register Office. Murray Threipland, known as Peter, was an archaeologist who had dug at Ur in Iraq among other sites and a landowner; he was the son of William Murray Threipland. The couple had four boys: David (b. 1939), Andrew (b. 1942), Stuart (b. 1947) and Charles (b. 1953). Peter died suddenly in 1957. Their youngest son, Charles, died aged 16 on 24 January 1970 of leukaemia. Scott killed herself that same day in a hotel in Brighton. She was 56. She is buried at St Isan's Church, Llanishen, Cardiff, Wales. Her third son Stuart, known as Tertius, was married to Claire, first wife of Henry Herbert, 17th Earl of Pembroke. Stuart killed himself on 12 June 2023. Scott was the aunt of Nigel McNair Scott.

== Selected publications ==
- 1938. "The Roman villa at Angmering", Sussex Archaeological Collections 79, pp. 3–44 (as Leslie Scott).
- 1939. "Angmering Roman villa. Report on the excavations in 1938", Sussex Archaeological Collections 80, pp. 89–92 (as Leslie Scott).
- 1942–1943. "The excavation of two cairn cemeteries near Hirwaun, Glamorgan", Archaeologia Cambrensis 97, pp. 77-92 (as L. Murray Threipland, co-authored with A. Fox).
- 1943. "Excavations in Brittany, spring, 1939", The Archaeological Journal 100:1, pp. 128–149 (as Leslie Murray Threipland).
- 1951. "A limestone offering table", in The City of Akhenaten: The Excavations at Tell El Amarna During the Seasons 1926–1927 and 1931–1936. Part III: The Central City and the Official Quarters, vol. 1, London: Egypt Exploration Society, p. 233 (as L. Murray Thriepland [sic], volume by J.D.S. Pendlebury with contributions by J. Černý, H.W. Fairman, H. Frankfort & J. Samson).
- 1951. "Excavations at Dover 1945–1947", Archaeologia Cantiana 64, pp. 30–49 (as Leslie Murray Threipland, co-authored with K.A. Steer).
- 1953. "Part of a Roman lead coffin-lid from Glamorgan", Proceedings of the Society of Antiquaries of London 33:1-2, pp. 72–74 (as L. Murray Threipland).
- 1956. "An excavation at St. Mawgan-in-Pyder, North Cornwall", The Archaeological Journal 113, pp. 33–81 (as Leslie Murray Threipland).
- 1957. "Excavations in Dover", Archaeologia Cantiana 71, pp. 14–37 (as L. Murray Threipland).
- 1959. "Excavations at Caerleon, 1956", Archaeologia Cambrensis 108, pp. 126–143 (as Leslie M. Threipland, co-authored with W.J. Davies).
- 1963. "Excavations beside the north-west gate at Veii, 1957–58. Part II, The pottery", Papers of the British School at Rome 31, pp. 33–73 (as Leslie Murray Threipland).
- 1965. "Caerleon: Museum Street site, 1965", Archaeologia Cambrensis 114, pp. 130–145 (as Leslie M. Threipland).
- 1967. "Excavations at Caerleon, 1966; barracks in the north corner", Archaeologia Cambrensis 116, pp. 23–56 (as Leslie M. Threipland).
- 1968. The Ager Veientanus, north and east of Veii, entire volume of Papers of the British School at Rome 36, (as Leslie Murray Threipland, co-authored with Anne Kahane & John Ward-Perkins).
- 1969. "The Hall, Caerleon 1964: Excavations on the site of the legionary hospital", Archaeologia Cambrensis 118, pp. 86–123 (as L. Murray Threipland).
- 1969. "Veii. A deposit of votive pottery", Papers of the British School at Rome 37, pp. 1–13 (as Leslie Murray Threipland).
- 1970. "A semi-subterranean Etruscan building in the Casale Pian Roseto (Veii) area", Papers of the British School at Rome 38, pp. 62–121 (as Leslie Murray Threipland, co-authored with J.B. Ward-Perkins & Mario Torelli).
