= Lady Rosemary =

Lady Rosemary may refer to:-

- Lady Rosemary Firth, (1912–2001) a British social anthropologist
- Lady Rosemary Spencer-Churchill (b. 1929), maid of honour to Elizabeth II
- ST Lady Rosemary, a tug in service with Wilson Sons & Co, Brazil, 1947–66.
