= Edmund Leach =

British anthropologist (1910–1989)

Sir Edmund Ronald Leach
- Born: 7 November 1910; Sidmouth, England
- Died: 6 January 1989 (aged 78); Cambridge, England
- Education: Cambridge University
- Known for: Ethnographic work in Sarawak and Burma; Theories of social structure and cultural change Kinship as ideal systems Disagreement with French structuralist Claude Lévi-Strauss
- Awards: Provost of King's College (1966–1979); Chairman of Association of Social Anthropologists (1966–1970); President of the Royal Anthropological Institute (1971–1975); President of British Humanist Association (1970); Knighted (1973); Trustee of the British Museum (1975–1980)
- Scientific career
- Fields: social anthropology
- Workplaces: Burma Army; London School of Economics; Cambridge University
- Thesis: Cultural change, with special reference to the hill tribes of Burma and Assam (1947)
- Doctoral advisors: Bronisław Malinowski; Raymond Firth
- Doctoral students: [Fredrik Barth Jonathan Parry]

Sir Edmund Ronald Leach FRAI FBA (7 November 1910 – 6 January 1989) was a British social anthropologist and academic. He served as provost of King's College, Cambridge from 1966 to 1979. He was also president of the Royal Anthropological Institute from 1971 to 1975.

== Early years ==
=== Personal life ===
Leach was born in Sidmouth, Devon, the youngest of three children and the son of William Edmund Leach and Mildred Brierley. His father owned and was manager of a sugar plantation in northern Argentina. After romantic relationships with Leslie Scott and Rosemary Firth, both of which nearly led to engagements and the latter of which was rekindled in the late 1960s and 1970s, Leach married Celia Buckmaster in 1940. Buckmaster was then a painter and later published poetry and two novels. They had a daughter Louisa (Loulou) in 1941 and a son Alexander in 1946.

=== Education and career ===
Leach was educated at Marlborough College and Clare College, Cambridge, where he graduated with a BA with honours in Engineering in 1932.

After leaving Cambridge University, Leach took a four-year contract in 1933 with Butterfield and Swire in China, serving in Hong Kong, Shanghai, Chongqing, Qingdao, and Beijing. He found out after his contract expired that he did not like the business atmosphere and never again was going to sit on an office stool. He intended to return to England by way of Russia on the Trans-Siberian Railway, but increasing political turmoil in Russia convinced him otherwise. While in Beijing, Leach had a chance encounter with Kilton Stewart, a psychiatrist, former-Mormon missionary, and published author who invited him on a trip to the island of Botel Tobago off the coast of Formosa. Before returning to England, Leach spend several months among the Yami of that island, taking ethnographic notes and studying local boat design. This work resulted in a 1937 article in the anthropology journal Man.

He returned to England and studied social anthropology at the London School of Economics with Raymond Firth who introduced him to Bronisław Malinowski. He was an active member of Malinowski's "famous seminar". In 1938, Leach went to Iraq (Kurdistan) to study the Kurds, which resulted in Social and Economic Organization of the Rowanduz Kurds. However, he abandoned this trip because of the Munich Crisis. He wrote: "I've got an enormous amount of ability at almost anything, yet so far I've made absolutely no use of it... I seem to be a highly organized piece of mental apparatus for which nobody else has any use" (D.N.B. 258).

In 1939 he went to study the Kachin in the Kachin Hills area of Burma, and over several months mastered their language while staying at Hpalang. His studies were abruptedly interrupted by the outbreak of World War II, and he lost most of the manuscript material he had gathered during this period. Leach then joined the Burma Army, from the fall of 1939 to summer 1945, where he achieved the rank of Major. During his time in Burma, Leach acquired superior knowledge of Northern Burma and its many hill tribes. He served as commander of the Kachin irregular forces. This resulted in the publication of the "Jinghpaw Kinship Terminology: An Experiment in Ethnographic Algebra" in 1945.

After he left the Army in 1946, he returned to the London School of Economics to complete his dissertation under the supervision of Raymond Firth. In spring of 1947 he received a PhD in anthropology. His 732-page dissertation was based on his time in Burma and titled Cultural change, with special reference to the hill tribes of Burma and Assam. Later that same year, at the request of Sir Charles Arden Clark, the then Governor of Sarawak (then under British Colonial rule) and a referral by Raymond Firth, the British Colonial Social Science Research Council invited Leach to conduct a major survey of the local peoples. The resulting 1948 report, Social Science Research in Sarawak (later published in 1950), was used as a guide for many well-known subsequent anthropological studies of region. In addition to the report, Leach produced five additional publications from this field work. Upon returning from his fieldwork in Borneo, Leach became a lecturer at LSE.

In 1951, Leach won the Curl Essay Prize for his essay The Structural Implications of Matrilateral Cross-Cousin Marriage, which drew on his extensive data on the Kachin to make important theoretical points as it related to kinship theory.

In 1953, he became a lecturer at Cambridge University, and promoted to Reader in 1957.

Along with his wife, Celia, Leach spent a year from 1960 to 1961 at the Center for Advanced Study in the Behavioral Studies in Palo Alto, California. Here he met Roman Jakobson, the Russian linguist, popularizer of Saussurean structural linguistics, and a major influence on the theoretical thinking of Levi-Strauss, leading to his structural anthropology.

In 1972 he received a personal chair. He was elected provost of King's College, Cambridge in 1966 and retired in 1979; President of the Royal Anthropological Institute (1971–1975); a Fellow of the British Academy (from 1972) and was knighted in 1975.

== Academic contributions ==
Leach spanned the gap between British structural-functionalism (exemplified by Alfred Radcliffe-Brown and Malinowski), and French structuralism (exemplified by Levi-Strauss). Despite being a central interpreter of Levi-Strauss' work, producing several introductory works on Levi-Strauss' theoretical perspective, Leach considered himself "at heart, still a 'functionalist'".

His book Lévi-Strauss was translated into six languages and ran three editions. His turn of phrase produced memorable quotes, such as this on Lévi-Strauss:

"The outstanding characteristic of [Lévi-Strauss's] writing, whether in French or English, is that it is difficult to understand; his sociological theories combine baffling complexity with overwhelming erudition. Some readers even suspect that they are being treated to a confidence trick".

Leach's work on Lévi-Strauss is often relied on by other authors. For example, in Richard Wrangham's (2009) book Catching Fire: How Cooking Made Us Human, he relies on Leach in describing Lévi-Strauss's analysis of cooking in relation to human culture.

Leach's first book was Political Systems of Highland Burma (1954); it challenged the theories of social structure and cultural change. Throughout, Leach was "fiercely critical of generalisations from one society to a narrative about 'politics' in so-called 'primitive societies'".

His second book was Pul Eliya, a Village in Ceylon (1961), where he directed his attention to theories of kinship as ideal systems. Leach's interest in kinship was first exemplified by his 1951 article (which won the Curl Essay Prize), and it was here that he first cites Levi-Strauss, disagreeing with several aspects of the latter's kinship theory outlined in Elementary Structures of Kinship. Leach applied his analysis of kinship to his disagreement with Lévi-Strauss in Pul Eliya, introducing Levi-Strauss's work into British social anthropology in doing so.

== Bibliography ==
- Social And Economic Organization of the Rowanduz Kurds (Berg Publishers, 1940)
- Political Systems of Highland Burma: A Study of Kachin Social Structure (Harvard University Press, 1954)
- ed. Aspects of Caste in South India, Ceylon and North-West Pakistan (Cambridge University Press, 1960; revised edition 1971)
- Rethinking Anthropology (Robert Cunningham and Sons Ltd., 1961)
- Pul Eliya: A Village in Ceylon: A Study of Land Tenure and Kinship (Cambridge University Press, 1961)
- Dialectic in Practical Religion (Cambridge University Press, 1968)
- ed. Structural Study of Myth and Totemism (Routledge, 1968)
- A Runaway World? (London: BBC, 1968)
- Genesis as Myth and Other Essays (Jonathan Cape, 1969)
- Lévi-Strauss (Fontana Books, 1970; new edition 1985)
- Claude Lévi-Strauss (Viking Press, 1970; revised edition in 1974; 2nd revised edition 1996)
- Culture and Communication: The Logic by which Symbols Are Connected. An Introduction to the Use of Structuralist Analysis in Social Anthropology (Cambridge University Press, 1976)
- Custom, Law and Terrorist Violence (Edinburgh University Press, 1977)
- ed. The Kula: New Perspectives on Massim Exchange with Jerry W. Leach (Cambridge University Press, 1983)
- Social Anthropology (Oxford University Press, 1982)
- Structuralist Interpretations of Biblical Myth (Cambridge University Press, 1983)
- The Essential Edmund Leach (Anthropology & Society & Culture & Human Nature) ed. by Stephen Hugh-Jones and James Laidlaw (Yale University Press, 2001, 2 vols.)
- ed. Elites in South Asia with S. N. Mukherjee (Cambridge University Press, 2009)

== Literature ==
- Tambiah, Stanley J., Edmund Leach: An Anthropological Life (2002). Cambridge University Press.
- "Leach, Edmund Ronald" Contemporary Authors Vol. 127, Gale Research Inc. 1989.
- "Leach, Sir Edmund Ronald" Dictionary of National Biography 1986–1990. Oxford University Press 1996.
- "Leach, Edmund Ronald" International Dictionary of Anthropologists. Garland Publishing 1991.
- Leach, Edmund R. Glimpses of the Unmentionable in the History of British Social Anthropology. Annual Review of Anthropology, Vol. 13. 1984.

Academic offices
Preceded by Noel Annan	Provost of King's College, Cambridge; 1966-1979	Succeeded by Bernard Williams
