= Raymond Firth =

Economic anthropologist

Sir Raymond Firth CNZM FRAI FBA
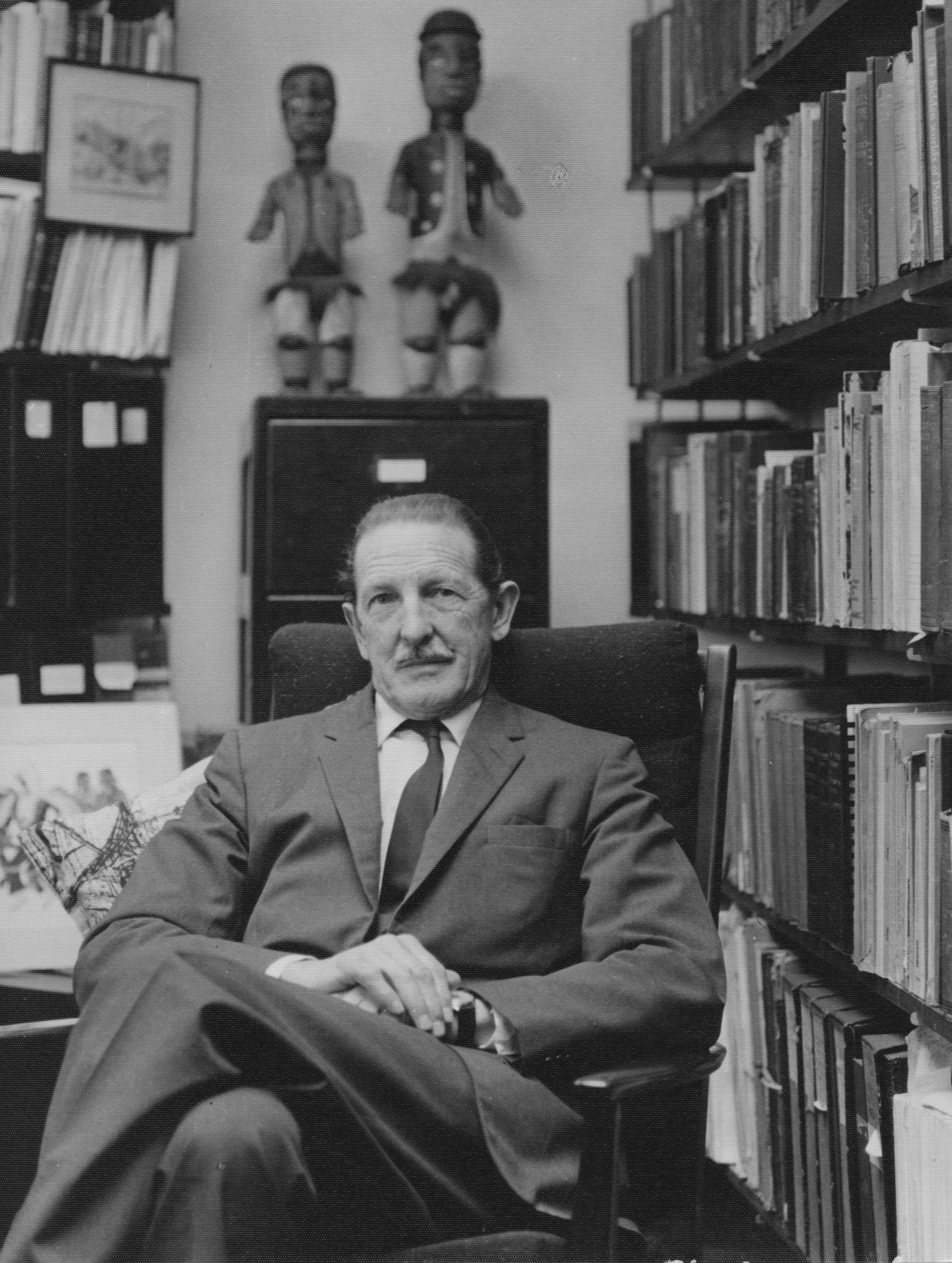
- Firth, c. 1965
- Born: Raymond William Firth; 25 March 1901; Auckland, New Zealand
- Died: 22 February 2002 (aged 100); London, England
- Education: Auckland University College (BA, MA, Dipl); London School of Economics (PhD)
- Spouse: Rosemary Upcott (m. 1936; died 2001)
- Scientific career
- Fields: Ethnology
- Thesis: Economic organisation of Polynesian societies: wealth and work of the Maori (1927)
- Academic advisors: Bronisław Malinowski
- Doctoral students: Ernest Gellner; Edmund Leach; Kenneth Little; Joan Metge

Sir Raymond William Firth (25 March 1901 – 22 February 2002) was an ethnologist from New Zealand. As a result of Firth's ethnographic work, actual behaviour of societies (social organization) is separated from the idealized rules of behaviour within the particular society (social structure). He was a long-serving professor of anthropology at the London School of Economics, and is considered to have singlehandedly created a form of British economic anthropology.

== Early life ==
Firth was born to Wesley and Marie Firth in Auckland, New Zealand, in 1901. He was educated at Auckland Grammar School, and then at Auckland University College, where he graduated in economics in 1921. He took his economics MA there in 1922 with a 'fieldwork' based research thesis on the Kauri Gum digging industry, then a diploma in social science in 1923. In 1924 he began his doctoral research at the London School of Economics. Originally intending to complete a thesis in economics, a chance meeting with the eminent social anthropologist Bronisław Malinowski led to him to alter his field of study to 'blending economic and anthropological theory with Pacific ethnography'. It was possibly during this period in England that he worked as research assistant to Sir James G Frazer, author of The Golden Bough. Firth's doctoral thesis was published in 1929 as Primitive Economics of the New Zealand Māori.

== Academic career ==
After receiving his PhD in 1927, Firth returned to the southern hemisphere to take up a position at the University of Sydney. He did not start teaching immediately as a research opportunity presented itself. In 1928, he first visited Tikopia, the southernmost of the Solomon Islands, to study the untouched Polynesian society there, resistant to outside influences and still with its pagan religion and undeveloped economy. This was the beginning of a long relationship with the 1200 people of the remote four-mile long island, and resulted in ten books and numerous articles written over many years. The first of these, We the Tikopia: A Sociological Study of Kinship in Primitive Polynesia was published in 1936 and seventy years on is still used as a basis for many university courses about Oceania. We the Tikopia has been through dozens of editions, and its title was adapted by the British-born New Zealand doctor David Lewis: We, the Navigators, The Ancient Art of Landfinding in the Pacific.

In 1930, he started teaching at the University of Sydney. On the departure for Chicago of Alfred Radcliffe-Brown, Firth succeeded him as acting Professor. He also took over from Radcliffe-Brown as acting editor of the journal Oceania, and as acting director of the Anthropology Research Committee of the Australian National Research Committee.

After 18 months, he returned to the London School of Economics in 1933 to take up a lectureship, and was appointed Reader in 1935. Together with his wife Rosemary Firth, also to become a distinguished anthropologist, he undertook fieldwork in Kelantan and Terengganu in Malaya in 1939–1940.

During the Second World War, Firth worked for British naval intelligence, primarily writing and editing the four volumes of the Naval Intelligence Division Geographical Handbook Series that concerned the Pacific Islands. During this period, Firth was based in Cambridge, where the LSE had its wartime home. In November 1940, Firth and his wife were passengers to Britain on the RMS Rangitiki when its convoy was attacked in the Atlantic ocean by the German pocket battleship Admiral Scheer. Rangitiki and most other ships in Convoy HX 84 escaped thanks to the actions of escort Captain Edward Fegen, commander of HMS Jervis Bay, who sacrificed himself and his ship to give the merchant ships the time to get away.

Firth succeeded Malinowski as Professor of Social Anthropology at LSE in 1944, and he remained at the School for the next 24 years. From 1948 to 1952, he was a member of the Academic Advisory Committee of the then-fledgling Australian National University in Canberra, Australia, along with Howard Florey (co-developer of medicinal penicillin), Mark Oliphant (a nuclear physicist who worked on the Manhattan Project), and Keith Hancock (Chichele Professor of Economic History at Oxford). Firth was particularly focused on the creation of the university's Research School of Pacific (and Asian) Studies.

He returned to Tikopia on research visits several times, although as travel and fieldwork requirements became more burdensome he focused on family and kinship relationships in working- and middle-class London.

Firth left LSE in 1968, when he took up a year's appointment as Professor of Pacific Anthropology at the University of Hawaiʻi. There followed visiting professorships at British Columbia (1969), Cornell (1970), Chicago (1970–71), the Graduate School of the City University of New York (1971) and UC Davis (1974). The second festschrift published in his honour described him as 'perhaps the greatest living teacher of anthropology today'.

After retiring from teaching work, Firth continued with his research interests, and right up until his hundredth year he was producing articles. He died in London at age 100; his father had lived to 104.

== Honours ==
- 1949 Fellow of the British Academy
- 1958 Viking Fund Medal
- 1959 Huxley Memorial Medal
- 1963 elected to the American Academy of Arts and Sciences
- 1965 elected to the American Philosophical Society
- 1973 Knighted
- 1981 Bronislaw Malinowski Award
- 2001 Companion of the New Zealand Order of Merit in the 2001 Queen's Birthday Honours, for services to anthropology
- 2002 Received the first Leverhulme Medal for a scholar of international distinction

== Personal life ==
Firth married Rosemary Firth (née Upcott) in 1936; they had one child, a son, Hugh, who was born in 1946. Rosemary died in 2001. Firth was raised a Methodist then later became a humanist and an atheist, a decision influenced by his anthropological studies. He was one of the signatories of the Humanist Manifesto. The Firths bought a cottage in the West Dorset village of Thorncombe in 1937; it was the family's second home until Raymond's death in 2002. The Firths' ashes were interred on 7 June 2002 at Thorncombe parish church.

In 2023 the Firths' son Hugh co-authored a book with Loulou Brown, daughter of anthropologist Edmund Leach, which explored the careers of primarily Rosemary, but also those of Raymond and Leach; it also revealed the romantic relationships between Rosemary and the two men.

== Māori lament (poroporoaki) for Sir Raymond Firth ==
Composed on behalf of the Polynesian Society by its then-President, Professor Sir Hugh Kawharu (English translation)

You have left us now, Sir Raymond
Your body has been pierced by the spear of death
And so farewell. Farewell,
Scholar renowned in halls of learning throughout the world
'Navigator of the Pacific'
'Black hawk' of Tamaki.

Perhaps in the end you were unable to complete all
the research plans that you had once imposed upon yourself
But no matter! The truly magnificent legacy you have left
will be an enduring testimony to your stature.

Moreover, your spirit is still alive among us,
We, who have become separated from you in New Zealand,
in Tikopia and elsewhere.

Be at rest, father. Rest, forever,
in peace, and in the care of the Almighty.

== Selected bibliography ==
- 1925. "The Korekore pa", Journal of the Polynesian Society 34, pp. 1–18.
- 1925. "The Māori carver", Journal of the Polynesian Society 34, pp. 277–291.
- 1929. Primitive Economics of the New Zealand Māori, London: George Routledge and Sons, preface by R.H. Tawney, revised as Economics of the New Zealand Māori in 1959.
- 1936. We the Tikopia: A Sociological Study of Kinship in Primitive Polynesia, London: Allen and Unwin, revised edition 1957.
- 1938. Human Types: An Introduction to Social Anthropology, London: Thomas Nelson, revised edition 1975.
- 1939. Primitive Polynesian Economy, London: Routledge & Sons, Ltd.
- 1940. The Work of the Gods in Tikopia, Melbourne: Melbourne University Press, revised edition 1967.
- 1943. "The coastal people of Kelantan and Trengganu, Malaya", Geographical Journal 101:5/6, pp. 193–205.
- 1943. Pacific Islands Volume 2: Eastern Pacific, ed., with J. W. Davidson & Margaret Davies, Naval Intelligence Division Geographical Handbook Series, HMSO (November 1943).
- 1944. Pacific Islands Volume 3: Western Pacific (Tonga to the Solomon Islands), ed., with J. W. Davidson & Margaret Davies, Naval Intelligence Division Geographical Handbook Series, HMSO (December 1944).
- 1945. Pacific Islands Volume 4: Western Pacific (New Guinea and Islands Northwards), ed., with J. W. Davidson & Margaret Davies, Naval Intelligence Division Geographical Handbook Series, HMSO (August 1945).
- 1945. Pacific Islands Volume 1: General Survey, ed., with J. W. Davidson & Margaret Davies), Naval Intelligence Division Geographical Handbook Series, HMSO (August 1945).
- 1946. Malay Fishermen: Their Peasant Economy, London: Kegan Paul, Trench, Trubner, revised edition 1966.
- 1951. Elements of Social Organization, London: Watts and Co.
- 1954. "Social organization and social change", Journal of the Royal Anthropological Institute 84, pp. 1–20.
- 1955. "Some principles of social organization", Journal of the Royal Anthropological Institute 85, pp. 1–18.
- 1957. Man and Culture: An Evaluation of the Work of Malinowski, Raymond Firth ed., London: Routledge & Kegan Paul.
- 1959. Economics of the New Zealand Māori, Wellington: Government Printer, revised edition of Primitive Economics of the New Zealand Māori (1929).
- 1959. Social Change in Tikopia: Re-study of a Polynesian Community After a Generation, London: George Allen and Unwin.
- 1961. History and Traditions of Tikopia (The Polynesian Society Memoir 32), Wellington: Polynesian Society.
- 1964. Essays on Social Organization and Values (London School of Economics Monographs on Social Anthropology 28), London: Athlone Press.
- 1964. Capital, Saving and Credit in Peasant Societies, ed., with Bail Yamey, London: George Allen and Unwin.
- 1967. Tikopia Ritual and Belief, London: George Allen and Unwin.
- 1967. "Themes in economic anthropology: A general comment", in Themes in Economic Anthropology, ed. Raymond Firth, London: Tavistock, pp. 1–28.
- 1969. Families and Their Relatives: Kinship in a Middle-Class Sector of London, with Jane Hubert and Anthony Forge, London: Routledge & Kegan Paul.
- 1970. Rank and Religion in Tikopia, London: George Allen and Unwin.
- 1973. Symbols: Public and Private, London: George Allen and Unwin.
- 1973. "The sceptical anthropologist? Social anthropology and Marxist views on society", Proceedings of the British Academy 58, pp. 177–213.
- 1975. "The sceptical anthropologist? Social anthropology and Marxist views on society", in Marxist Analyses and Social Anthropology, ed. M. Bloch, London: Malaby, pp. 29–60.
- 1975. "An appraisal of modern social anthropology", Annual Review of Anthropology 4, pp. 1–25.
- 1977. "Whose frame of reference? One anthropologist's experience", Anthropological Forum 4:2, pp. 9–31.
- 1984. "Roles of women and men in a sea fishing economy: Tikopia compared with Kelantan", in The Fishing Culture of the World: Studies in Ethnology, Cultural Ecology and Folklore, ed. Béla Gunda, Budapest: Akadémiai Kiadó, pp. 1145–1170.
- 1985. Taranga Fakatikopia ma Taranga Fakainglisi: Tikopia-English Dictionary, with Ishmael Tuki & Pa Rangiaco, Auckland & Oxford: Auckland University Press & Oxford University Press.
- 1990. Tikopia Songs: Poetic and Musical Art of a Polynesian People of the Solomon Islands, with Mervyn Mclean, Cambridge: Cambridge University Press.
- 1996. Religion: A Humanist Interpretation, London: Routledge.
- 2001. "Tikopia dreams: Personal images of social reality", Journal of the Polynesian Society 110:1, pp. 7–29.
- 2001. "The creative contribution of indigenous people to their ethnography", Journal of the Polynesian Society 110:3, pp. 241–245.

=== Papers ===
Firth's papers are held at the London School of Economics – including his photographic collection
