= Social anthropology =

Branch of anthropology

Social anthropology is the study of patterns of behaviour in human societies and cultures. It is the dominant constituent of anthropology throughout the United Kingdom and much of Europe, where it is distinguished from cultural anthropology. In the United States, social anthropology is commonly subsumed within cultural anthropology or sociocultural anthropology.

== Comparison with cultural anthropology ==
The term cultural anthropology is generally applied to ethnographic works that are holistic in spirit, oriented toward how culture affects individual experience, or that aim to provide a rounded view of the knowledge, customs, and institutions of people. Social anthropology is a term applied to ethnographic works that attempt to isolate a particular system of social relations, such as those that comprise domestic life, economy, law, politics, or religion, give analytical priority to the organizational bases of social life, and attend to cultural phenomena as somewhat secondary to the main issues of social scientific inquiry.

Topics of interest for social anthropologists have included customs, economic and political organization, law and conflict resolution, patterns of consumption and exchange, kinship and family structure, gender relations, childbearing and socialization, religion, while present-day social anthropologists are also concerned with issues of globalism, ethnic violence, gender studies, transnationalism and local experience, and the emerging cultures of cyberspace, and can also help with bringing opponents together when environmental concerns come into conflict with economic developments. British and American anthropologists, including Gillian Tett and Karen Ho, who studied Wall Street, provided an alternative explanation for the 2008 financial crisis to the technical explanations rooted in economic and political theory.

Differences among British, French, and American sociocultural anthropologies have diminished with increasing dialogue and borrowing of both theory and methods. Social and cultural anthropologists, and some who integrate the two, are found in most anthropology institutes. Thus, the formal names of institutional units no longer necessarily fully reflect the content of the disciplines they cover. Some, such as the Institute of Social and Cultural Anthropology (Oxford), changed their name to reflect the change in composition; others, such as Social Anthropology at the University of Kent, became simply Anthropology. Most retain the name under which they were founded.

Long-term qualitative research, including intensive field studies (emphasizing participant observation methods), has been traditionally encouraged in social anthropology rather than quantitative analysis of surveys, questionnaires and brief field visits typically used by economists, political scientists, and (most) sociologists.

== Comparison and intersection with cognitive anthropology ==
Cognitive anthropology studies how people represent and think about events and objects in the world. It links human thought processes and the physical and ideational aspects of culture. The scopes of these two disciplines intersect in the field of cognitive development. The following part of the section shows the significance of their co-research for understanding the processes that constitute society. According to Sir Edward Tylor: "Culture, or civilization, taken in its broad, ethnographic sense, is that complex whole which includes knowledge, belief, art, morals, law, custom, and any other capabilities and habits acquired by man as a member of society". The cultural consensus principle is incorporated in the reasoning behind the cultural consonance model and other similar models (see cognitive anthropology) that seek to evaluate the effects of shared cognitive structures on social life and the human condition beginning from the onset of cognitive development. The majority of social and cognitive anthropology concepts (e.g., Cultural consonance, Cultural models, Knowledge structures, Shared knowledge, etc.) seem to rely on broad, pervasive, and unconscious interactions among members of society. Research shows that unconscious remembering increases recall efficiency over time and yields greater confidence in that thought. According to the received view in cognitive sciences, cognition begins from birth (and even from prenatal) due to motive forces of shared intentionality: unaware knowledge assimilation. Therefore, mechanisms of unaware interactions at the onset of life, a focus of research in cognitive sciences, have become a central research issue in social and cognitive anthropology.

Another intersection of these two disciplines appears in neuroscience research. Behavioral propensities (an exteriorization of Cultural models, Schemata, etc.; see key concepts of cognitive anthropology) are the product of biological and cultural factors that manifest in individual brain development, neural wiring, and neurochemical homeostasis. According to the received view in neuroscience, an observed human behavior, in any context, is the last event in a long chain of biological and cultural interactions. The brain's anatomy is subject to neuroplasticity; it depends on both contextual (cultural) and historically dependent (previous experience) mechanisms to shape the neural system. By bridging sociology with anthropology and cognitive science perspectives, we can assess shared cultural knowledge – understand processes underlying unspoken social norms and beliefs, as well as study processes of shaping individual values that together constitute societies.

== Focus and practice ==
Social anthropology is distinguished from subjects such as economics or political science by its holistic scope, its attention to the comparative diversity of societies and cultures across the world, and the capacity this gives the discipline to re-examine Euro-American assumptions. It is differentiated from sociology, both in its main methods (based on long-term participant observation and linguistic competence), and in its commitment to the relevance and illumination provided by micro studies. It extends beyond strictly social phenomena to culture, art, individuality, and cognition. Many social anthropologists use quantitative methods, too, particularly those whose research touches on topics such as local economies, demography, human ecology, cognition, or health and illness.

=== Specializations ===
Specializations within social anthropology shift as its objects of study are transformed and new intellectual paradigms emerge; musicology and medical anthropology are examples of current, well-defined specialities. More recent and current specializations are:

- cognitive development – neuroscience research for the neuroplasticity and the shared intentionality approach to the extended mind thesis: the anthropological analysis of ecological learning in cognitive development;
- social and ethical understandings of novel technologies – the way anthropologists analyze everyday life, cultural reproduction, and human evolution;
- kinship – emergent forms of "the family" and other new socialities modelled on kinship;
- postsocialism crisis – the ongoing social fall-out of the demise of state socialism;
- the politics of resurgent religiosity; and
- audit cultures – analysis of audit cultures and accountability.

The subject has been enlivened by, and has contributed to, approaches from other disciplines, such as philosophy (ethics, phenomenology, logic), the history of science, psychoanalysis, and linguistics.

=== Ethical considerations ===
The subject has both ethical and reflexive dimensions. Practitioners have developed an awareness of the sense in which scholars create their objects of study and how anthropologists themselves may contribute to processes of change in the societies they study. An example of this is the "hawthorne effect", whereby those being studied may alter their behavior in response to being observed.

== History ==
Social anthropology has historical roots in a number of 19th-century disciplines, including the study of Classics, ethnography, ethnology, folklore, linguistics, and sociology, among others. Its immediate precursor took shape in the work of Edward Burnett Tylor and James George Frazer in the late 19th century and underwent major changes in both method and theory during the period 1890–1920 with a new emphasis on original fieldwork, long-term holistic study of social behavior in natural settings, and the introduction of French and German social theory.

Polish anthropologist and ethnographer Bronisław Malinowski, one of the most important influences on British social anthropology, emphasized long-term fieldwork in which anthropologists work in the vernacular and immerse themselves in the daily practices of local people. This development was bolstered by Franz Boas' introduction of the concept of cultural relativism, arguing that cultures are based on different ideas about the world and can therefore only be properly understood in terms of their own standards and values.

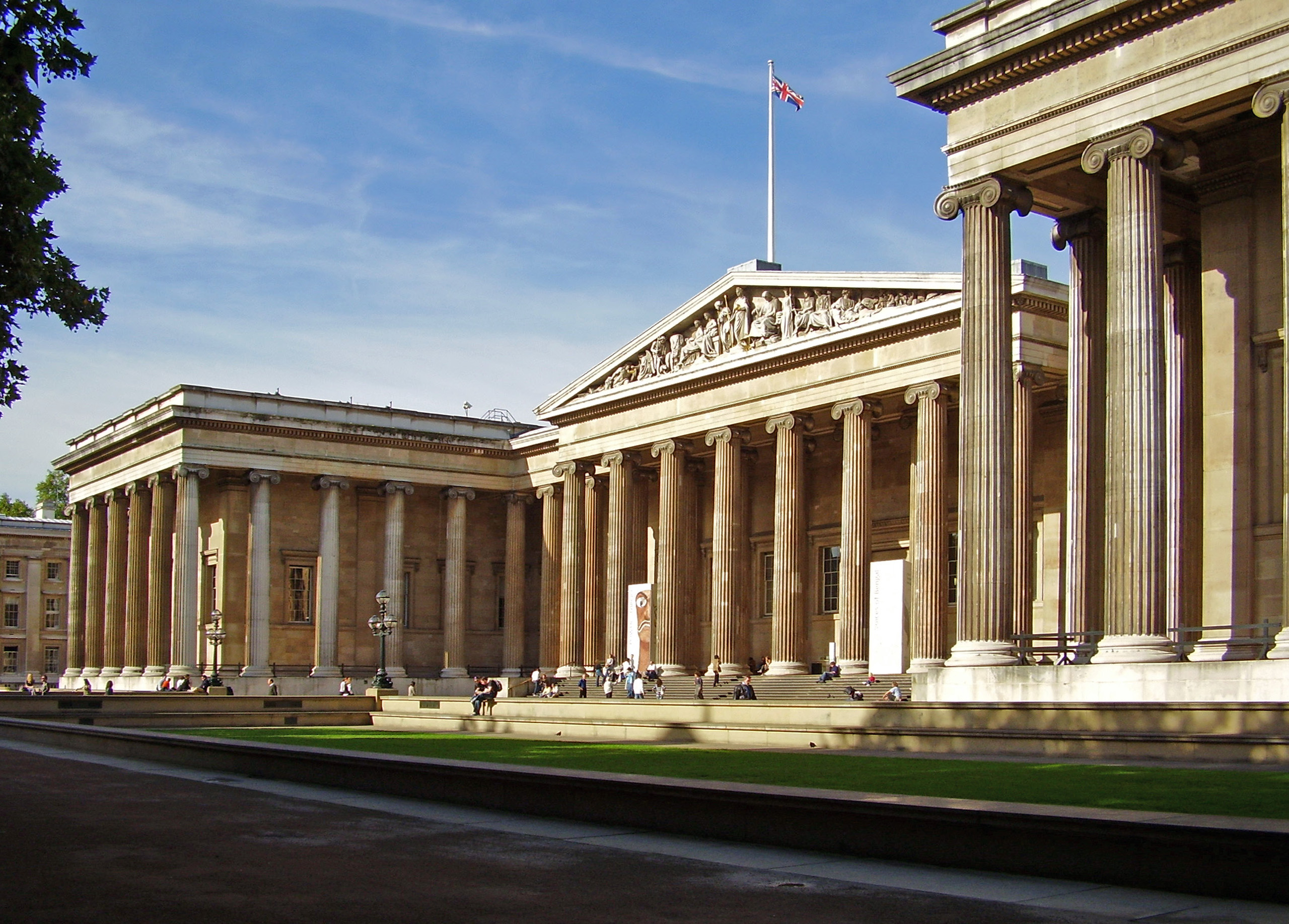
The British Museum, London

Museums such as the British Museum weren't the only site of anthropological studies; with the New Imperialism period, starting in the 1870s, zoos became unattended "laboratories", especially the so-called "ethnological exhibitions" or "Negro villages". Thus, "savages" from the Americas, Africa, and Asia were displayed, often nude, in cages, in what has been termed "human zoos". In 1906, Congolese pygmy Ota Benga was put by American anthropologist Madison Grant in a cage in the Bronx Zoo, labelled "the missing link" between an orangutan and the "White race"—Grant, a renowned eugenicist, was also the author of The Passing of the Great Race (1916). Such exhibitions were attempts to illustrate and prove in the same movement the validity of scientific racism, whose first formulation may be found in Arthur de Gobineau's An Essay on the Inequality of Human Races (1853–1855). In 1931, the Colonial Exhibition in Paris still displayed Kanaks from New Caledonia in the "indigenous village"; it received 24 million visitors in six months, thus demonstrating the popularity of such "human zoos".

Anthropology grew increasingly distinct from natural history, and by the end of the 19th century, the discipline began to crystallize into its modern form. By 1935, for example, T. K. Penniman could write a history of the discipline entitled A Hundred Years of Anthropology. At the time, the field was dominated by "the comparative method". It was assumed that all societies passed through a single evolutionary process from the most primitive to the most advanced. Non-European societies were thus seen as evolutionary "living fossils" that could be studied to understand the European past. Scholars wrote histories of prehistoric migrations, which were sometimes valuable but often also fanciful. It was during this time that Europeans first accurately traced Polynesian migrations across the Pacific Ocean—for instance, although some believed they originated in Egypt. Finally, the concept of race was actively discussed as a way to classify—and rank—human beings based on difference.

=== Tylor and Frazer ===
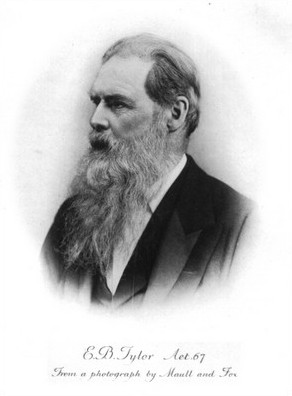
Edward Burnett Tylor, 19th-century British anthropologist

Edward Burnett Tylor (1832–1917) and James George Frazer (1854–1941) are generally considered the antecedents to modern social anthropologists in Great Britain. Although the British anthropologist Tylor undertook a field trip to Mexico, both he and Frazer derived most of the material for their comparative studies through extensive reading, not fieldwork, mainly the Classics (literature and history of Ancient Greece and Rome), the work of the early European folklorists, and reports from missionaries, travelers, and contemporaneous ethnologists.

Tylor advocated strongly for unilinealism and a form of "uniformity of mankind". Tylor in particular laid the groundwork for theories of cultural diffusionism, stating that there are three ways that different groups can have similar cultural forms or technologies: "independent invention, inheritance from ancestors in a distant region, transmission from one race [sic] to another".

Tylor formulated one of the early and influential anthropological conceptions of culture as "that complex whole, which includes knowledge, belief, art, morals, law, custom, and any other capabilities and habits acquired by [humans] as [members] of society." However, as Stocking notes, Tylor mainly concerned himself with describing and mapping the distribution of particular elements of culture, rather than with the larger function, and he generally seemed to assume a Victorian idea of progress rather than the idea of non-directional, multilineal cultural change proposed by later anthropologists. Tylor also theorized about the origins of religious beliefs in human beings, proposing a theory of animism as the earliest stage, and noting that "religion" has many components, of which he believed the most important to be belief in supernatural beings (as opposed to moral systems, cosmology, etc.).

Frazer, a Scottish scholar with a broad knowledge of Classics, also concerned himself with the study of religion, mythology, and magic. His comparative studies, most notably in the numerous editions of The Golden Bough, analyzed similarities in religious beliefs and symbolism worldwide. Neither Tylor nor Frazer, however, was particularly interested in fieldwork, nor were they interested in examining how the cultural elements and institutions fit together. The Golden Bough was abridged drastically in subsequent editions after its first.

=== Malinowski and the British School ===
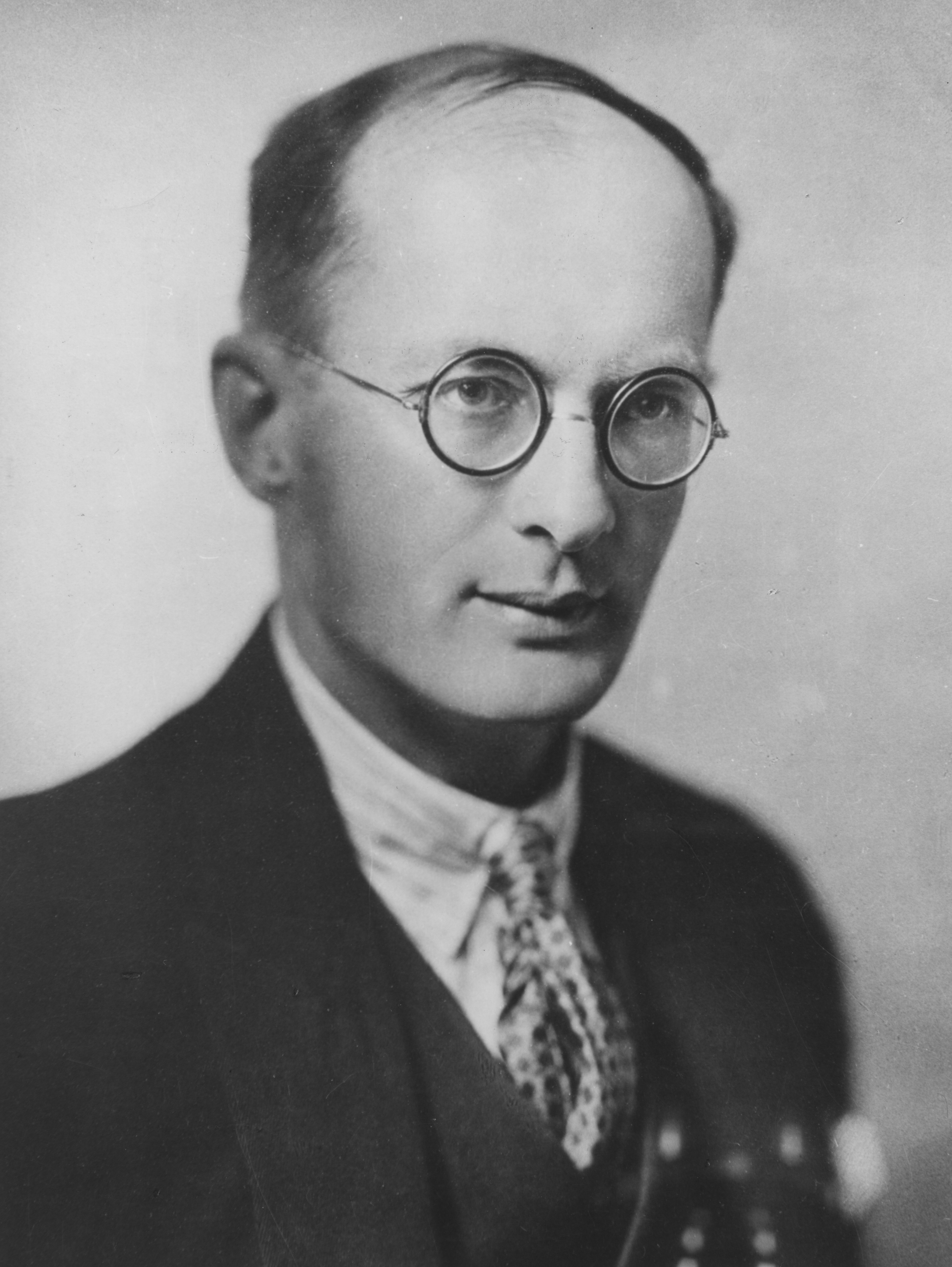
Bronisław Malinowski, Polish anthropologist and ethnographer at the London School of Economics and Political Science

Toward the turn of the 20th century, many anthropologists became dissatisfied with this categorization of cultural elements; historical reconstructions also came to seem increasingly speculative to them. Under the influence of several younger scholars, a new approach came to predominate among British anthropologists, concerned with analyzing how societies held together in the present (synchronic analysis, rather than diachronic or historical analysis), and emphasizing long-term (one to several years) immersion fieldwork. Cambridge University financed a multidisciplinary expedition to the Torres Strait Islands in 1898, organized by Alfred Cort Haddon and including a physician-anthropologist, William Rivers, as well as a linguist, a botanist, and other specialists. The findings of the expedition set new standards for ethnographic description.

A decade and a half later, the Polish anthropology student Bronisław Malinowski (1884–1942) was beginning what he expected to be a brief period of fieldwork in the old model, collecting lists of cultural items, when the outbreak of the First World War stranded him in New Guinea. As a subject of the Austro-Hungarian Empire resident on a British colonial possession, he was effectively confined to New Guinea for several years.

He made use of the time by undertaking far more intensive fieldwork than British anthropologists had done. His classic ethnographical work, Argonauts of the Western Pacific (1922) advocated an approach to fieldwork that became standard in the field: getting "the native's point of view" through participant observation. Theoretically, he advocated a functionalist interpretation, which examined how social institutions functioned to satisfy individual needs.

=== 1920s–1940 ===
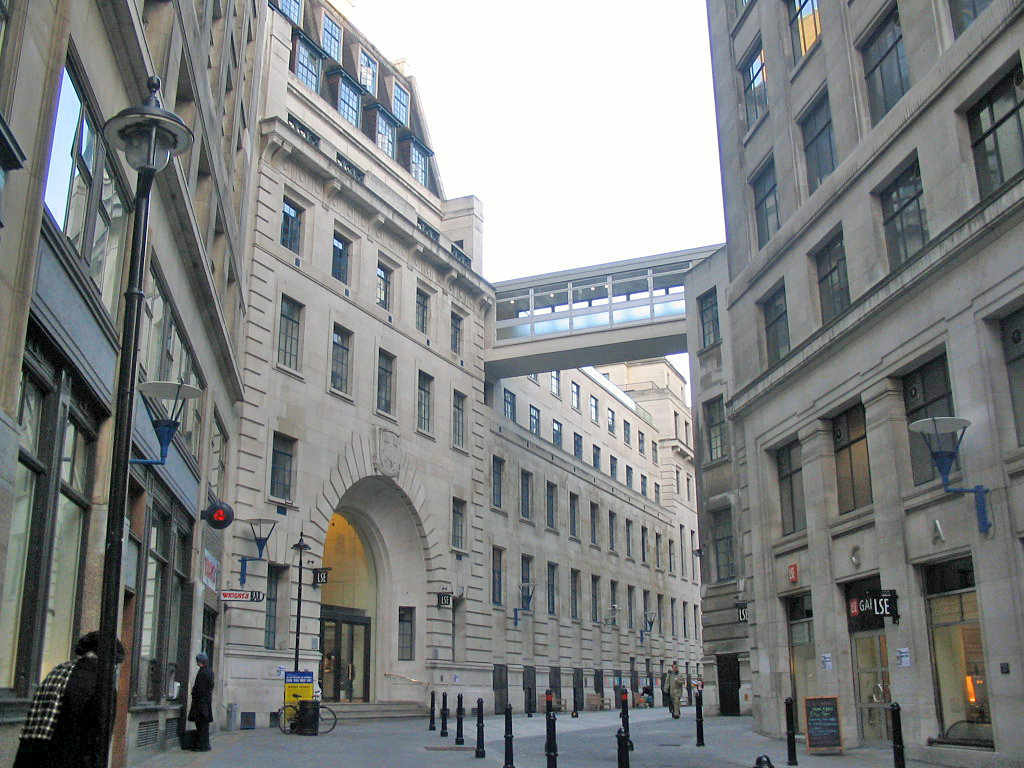
Main entrance to the London School of Economics and Political Science

Modern social anthropology was founded in Britain at the London School of Economics and Political Science following World War I. Influences include both the methodological revolution pioneered by Bronisław Malinowski's process-oriented fieldwork in the Trobriand Islands of Melanesia between 1915 and 1918 and Alfred Radcliffe-Brown's theoretical program for systematic comparison that was based on a conception of rigorous fieldwork and the structure-functionalist conception of Durkheim's sociology. Other intellectual founders include W. H. R. Rivers and A. C. Haddon, whose orientation reflected the contemporary Parapsychologies of Wilhelm Wundt and Adolf Bastian, and Sir E. B. Tylor, who defined anthropology as a positivist science following Auguste Comte. Edmund Leach (1962) defined social anthropology as a kind of comparative micro-sociology based on intensive fieldwork studies. Scholars have not settled on a theoretical orthodoxy regarding the nature of science and society, and the tensions between them reflect views that are seriously opposed.

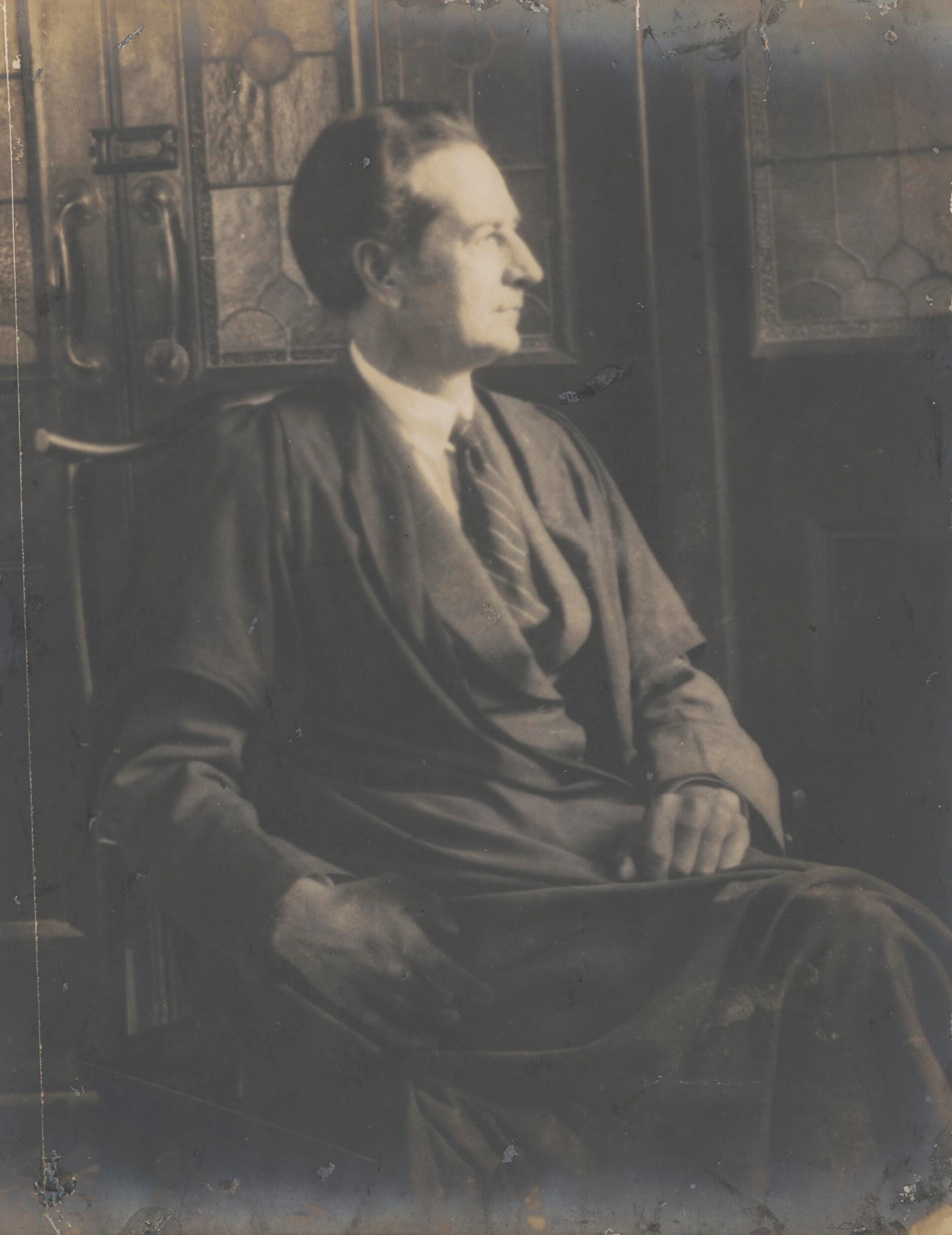
A. R. Radcliffe-Brown

A. R. Radcliffe-Brown also published a seminal work in 1922. He had carried out his initial fieldwork in the Andaman Islands in the old style of historical reconstruction. However, after reading the work of French sociologists Émile Durkheim and Marcel Mauss, Radcliffe-Brown published an account of his research (entitled The Andaman Islanders) that paid close attention to the meaning and purpose of rituals and myths. Over time, he developed an approach known as structural functionalism, which focused on how institutions in societies worked to balance or create an equilibrium in the social system, keeping it functioning harmoniously. His structuralist approach contrasted with Malinowski's functionalism. It was quite different from the later French structuralism, which examined the conceptual structures in language and symbolism.

Malinowski and Radcliffe-Brown's influence stemmed from their, like Boas's, active training of students and aggressive development of institutions that furthered their programmatic ambitions. This was particularly the case with Radcliffe-Brown, who spread his agenda for "Social Anthropology" by teaching at universities across the British Empire and Commonwealth. From the late 1930s until the postwar period, a string of monographs and edited volumes appeared that cemented the paradigm of British Social Anthropology (BSA). Famous ethnographies include The Nuer by Edward Evan Evans-Pritchard and The Dynamics of Clanship Among the Tallensi by Meyer Fortes; well-known edited volumes include African Systems of Kinship and Marriage and African Political Systems.

=== Post-World War II trends ===
Following World War II, sociocultural anthropology as comprised by the fields of ethnography and ethnology diverged into an American school of cultural anthropology while social anthropology diversified in Europe by challenging the principles of structure-functionalism, absorbing ideas from Claude Lévi-Strauss's structuralism and from the followers of Max Gluckman, and embracing the study of conflict, change, urban anthropology, and networks. Together with many of his colleagues at the Rhodes-Livingstone Institute and students at Manchester University, collectively known as the Manchester School, took BSA in new directions through their introduction of explicitly Marxist-informed theory, their emphasis on conflicts and conflict resolution, and their attention to how individuals negotiate and make use of the social structural possibilities. During this period, Gluckman was also involved in a dispute with American anthropologist Paul Bohannan on ethnographic methodology within the anthropological study of law. He believed that indigenous terms in ethnographic data should be translated into Anglo-American legal terms to benefit the reader. The Association of Social Anthropologists of the UK and Commonwealth was founded in 1946.

In Britain, anthropology had a great intellectual impact, it "contributed to the erosion of Christianity, the growth of cultural relativism, an awareness of the survival of the primitive in modern life, and the replacement of diachronic modes of analysis with synchronic, all of which are central to modern culture." Later in the 1960s and 1970s, Edmund Leach and his students Mary Douglas and Nur Yalman, among others, introduced French structuralism in the style of Claude Lévi-Strauss.

In countries of the British Commonwealth, social anthropology has often been institutionally separate from physical anthropology and primatology, which may be connected with departments of biology and zoology; and from archaeology, which may be connected with departments of Classics, Egyptology, Oriental studies, and the like. In other countries (and in some, particularly smaller, British and North American universities), anthropologists have also found themselves institutionally linked with scholars of cultural studies, ethnic studies, folklore, human geography, museum studies, sociology, social relations, and social work. British anthropology has continued to emphasize social organization and economics over purely symbolic or literary topics.

=== 1980s to present ===
The European Association of Social Anthropologists (EASA) was founded in 1989 as a society of scholarship at a meeting of founder members from fourteen European countries, supported by the Wenner-Gren Foundation for Anthropological Research. The Association seeks to advance anthropology in Europe by organizing biennial conferences and editing its academic journal, Social Anthropology/Anthropologies Social. Departments of Social Anthropology at different universities have tended to focus on disparate aspects of the field, and can be found in several universities around the world. The field of social anthropology has expanded in ways not anticipated by its founders, for example, in the subfield of structure and dynamics.

== Anthropologists associated with social anthropology ==
- Andre Beteille
- Aleksandar Boskovic
- Edmund Snow Carpenter
- Philippe Descola
- Mary Douglas
- Thomas Hylland Eriksen
- E. E. Evans-Pritchard
- Raymond Firth
- Rosemary Firth
- Meyer Fortes
- Ernest Gellner
- Stephen D. Glazier
- Jack Goody
- David Graeber
- Don Kalb
- Adam Kuper
- Edmund Leach
- Murray Leaf
- Claude Lévi-Strauss
- David MacDougall
- Judith MacDougall
- Alan Macfarlane
- Bronisław Malinowski
- Siegfried Frederick Nadel
- A.H.J. Prins
- Alfred Radcliffe-Brown
- Juan Mauricio Renold
- Audrey Richards
- Victor Turner
- Marshall Sahlins
- Marilyn Strathern
- Hebe Vessuri
- Susan Visvanathan
- Douglas R. White
- Eric Wolf
- Robert Layton

== See also ==
- Cultural anthropology
- Ethnology
- Ethnosemiotics
- List of important publications in anthropology
- Rajamandala
