= Juan Mauricio Renold =

Argentine social anthropologist

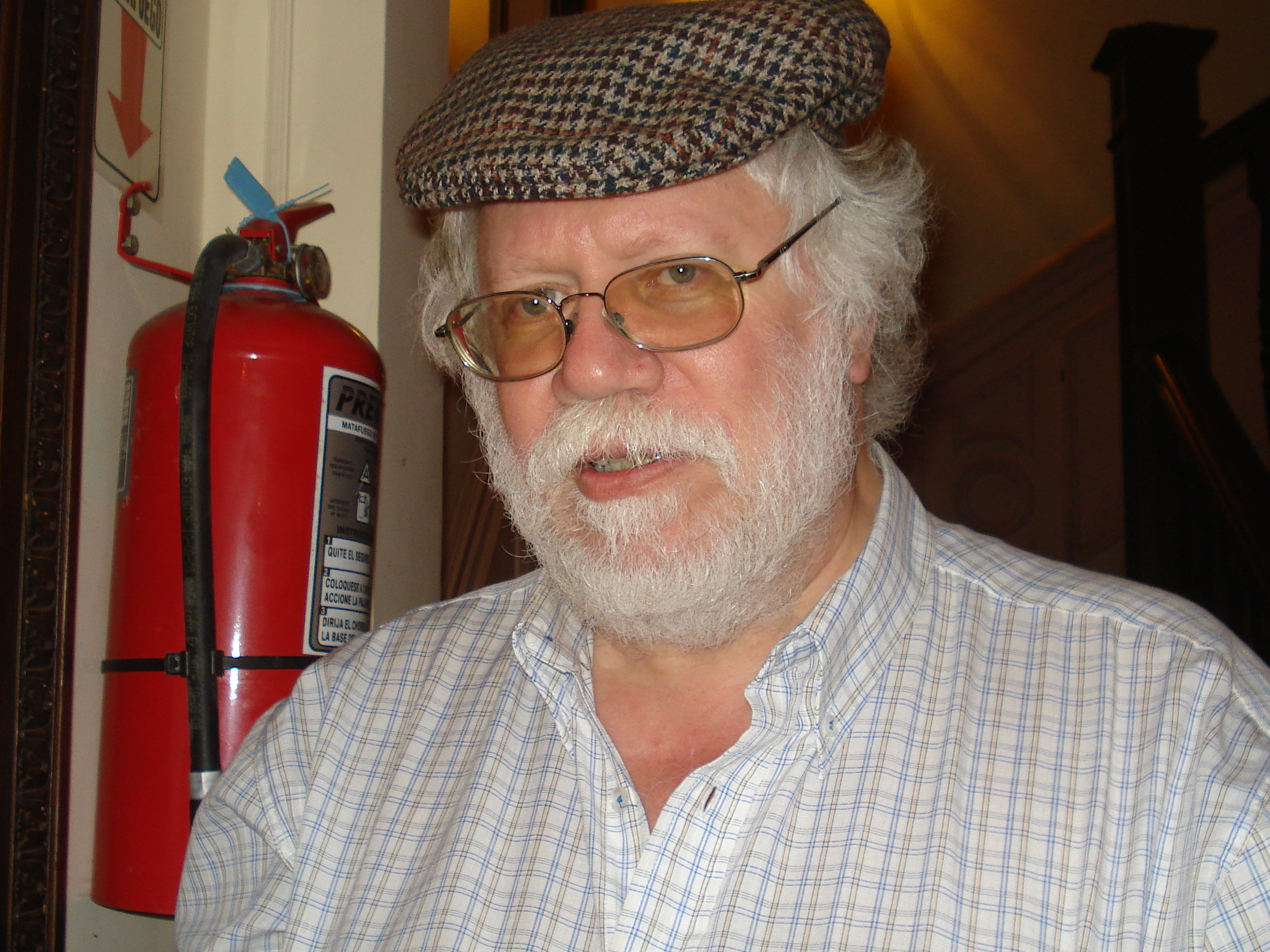
- Juan Mauricio Renold (2014)
- Born: 1953; Rosario, Argentina
- Occupation: Social anthropologist
- Employer(s): Faculty of Humanities and Arts of the National University of Rosario, Argentina. Council of Investigations of the National University of Rosario, Argentina.

Juan Mauricio Renold (born 1953) is an Argentine social anthropologist. He is a research scientist in the Scientific Council of Research of the National University of Rosario, professor (Titular) in the School of Anthropology of the Faculty of Humanities and Arts of the National University of Rosario, in the city of Rosario (Argentina).

== Career ==
He has specialized in an original application of the anthropological structural analysis (referred the proposals of Claude Lévi-Strauss) in institutional organizations, analyzing them like systems of representations, in complex societies.

In the academic context of the Argentine social anthropology, he is a pioneer in the application of the structural analysis in farming cooperative organizations, in religious organizations, as well as in the wide field of the systems of religious representations and beliefs in general. It has also implemented the structural analysis in rites of healing, performed by catholic priests and pentecostal religious expression.

== Writings by Juan Mauricio Renold ==
- "Organización y estructura en un grupo religioso" (“Organization and structure in a religious group”), en: Ensayos de Antropología argentina. A.A.V.V. (in: Essays of Argentine anthropology). (Several authors). Buenos Aires: Editorial de Belgrano, 1984.
- Estructura y organización cooperativa en el campo argentino. Un análisis antropológico-institucional (Structure and cooperative organization in the Argentine field. An anthropological-institutional analysis). Rosario: Editorial Magister, 1995.
- El cooperativismo agrario ante la globalización (Agrarian cooperatism against the globalisation) (en colaboración con Mario Lattuada) (in collaboration with Mario Lattuada). Buenos Aires: SigloXXI, 2004.
- Antropología social. Relecturas y ensayos (Social anthropology. Res-reading and essays). Buenos Aires: Biblos, 2008.
- Miradas antropológicas sobre la vida religiosa. El Padre Ignacio, sanación y eficacia simbólica y otros ensayos (Anthropological glances on the religious life. Father Ignacio, health and symbolic effectiveness and other essays). Compilador (Compiler): Juan Mauricio Renold. Buenos Aires: Ciccus, 2008.
