= Welsh Guards =

Infantry regiment of the British Army

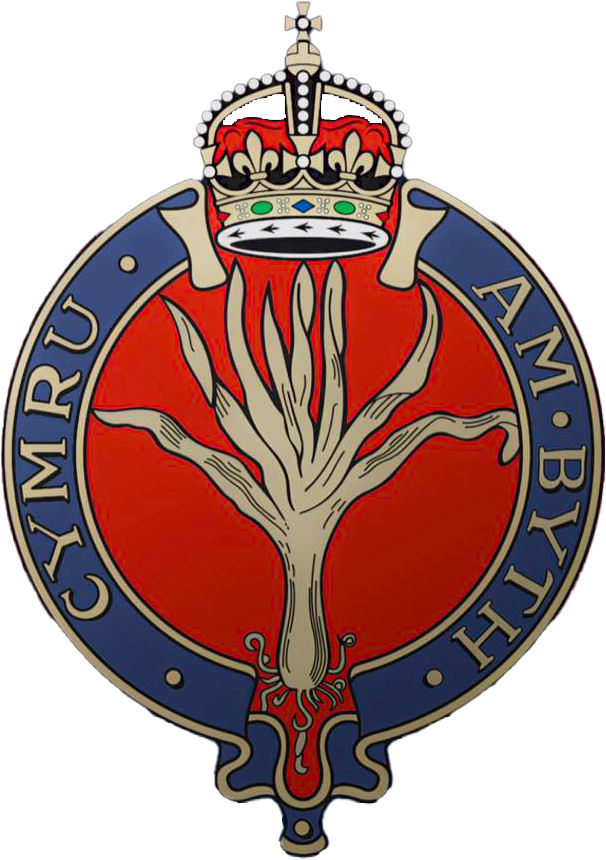
- Regimental badge of the Welsh Guards (Note: Representing a leek, a traditional symbol of Wales.)
- Active: 1915–present
- Country: United Kingdom
- Branch: British Army
- Type: Infantry
- Role: 1st Battalion – Light Mechanised Infantry
- Size: 1 Battalion (579 personnel)
- Part of: Guards and Parachute Division
- Garrison/HQ: RHQ – London; 1st Battalion – Windsor
- Nicknames: While known as "the Taffs" to their fellow Guardsmen, no nicknames are officially recognized.
- Motto: Welsh: Cymru am Byth ("Wales Forever/Long live Wales")
- March: Quick – Rising of the Lark; Slow – Men of Harlech
- Anniversaries: 1 March (St David's Day), 26 February (Formation Date)

Commanders
- Commanding Officer: Lt Col Andrew Breach
- Colonel-in-Chief: King Charles III
- Colonel of the Regiment: William, Prince of Wales

Insignia
- Tactical Recognition Flash
- Plume: White/Green/White; Left side of Bearskin cap
- Abbreviation: WLSH GDS

The Welsh Guards (WLSH GDS; Welsh: Gwarchodlu Cymreig), part of the Guards Division, is one of the Foot Guards regiments of the British Army. It was founded in 1915 as a single-battalion regiment, during the First World War, by Royal Warrant of George V. Shortly after the regiment's formation, it was deployed to France where it took part in the fighting on the Western Front until the end of the war in November 1918. During the inter-war years, the regiment undertook garrison duties in the United Kingdom, except between 1929 and 1930 when it deployed to Egypt, and late 1939 when it deployed to Gibraltar.

The regiment was expanded to three battalions during the Second World War, and served in France, North Africa, Tunisia, Italy and Western Europe. In the post war period, the regiment was reduced to a single battalion and saw service in Palestine, Egypt, West Germany, Aden, Northern Ireland, and Cyprus. In 1982, the regiment took part in the Falklands War. In the 21st century, the regiment has deployed as peacekeepers to Bosnia, and on operations to both Iraq and Afghanistan.

== History ==
=== Creation and First World War service ===
The Welsh Guards came into existence on 26 February 1915 by Royal Warrant of George V in order to include Wales in the national component to the Foot Guards, "..though the order to raise the regiment had been given by the King to Earl Kitchener, Secretary of State for War, on 26 February 1915." They were the last of the Guards to be created, with the Irish Guards coming into being in 1900. Just three days later, the 1st Battalion Welsh Guards mounted its first King's Guard at Buckingham Palace on 1 March 1915 – St David's Day.

On 17 August 1915, the 1st Battalion sailed for France to join the Guards Division to commence its participation in the First World War. Its first battle was some months after its initial arrival, at Loos on 27 September 1915. The regiment's first Victoria Cross came two years later in July 1917 awarded to Sergeant Robert Bye.

=== Inter-war years ===
Soon after the end of the war in 1918 1st Battalion, Welsh Guards returned home and where they would be based for much of the inter-war period, performing training and ceremonial duties, such as the Changing of the Guard and Trooping the Colour. In 1929, 1st Welsh Guards deployed to Egypt where they joined the Cairo Brigade where they stayed for only a brief period of time, returning home in 1930. Just prior to the outbreak of the Second World War, 1st Welsh Guards were dispatched to Gibraltar where they remained upon the outbreak of war in September 1939. The 2nd Battalion, Welsh Guards was created in 1939.

=== Second World War ===
The Welsh Guards were increased to three battalions during the Second World War. The 1st Battalion fought valiantly in all the campaigns of the North-West European Theatre. The 2nd Battalion, part of the 20th Independent Infantry Brigade (Guards), fought briefly in Boulogne, France, in late May 1940 whilst the 1st fought in the battles of Belgium and France as part of the British Expeditionary Force (BEF) GHQ Troops. In May 1940 at the Battle of Arras, the Welsh Guards gained their second Victoria Cross by Lieutenant Christopher Furness, who was subsequently killed in action. The 1st Battalion was subsequently part of the retreat to Dunkirk, where they were involved in the legendary Dunkirk evacuation that saw nearly 340,000 Allied troops return to the United Kingdom, against all odds.

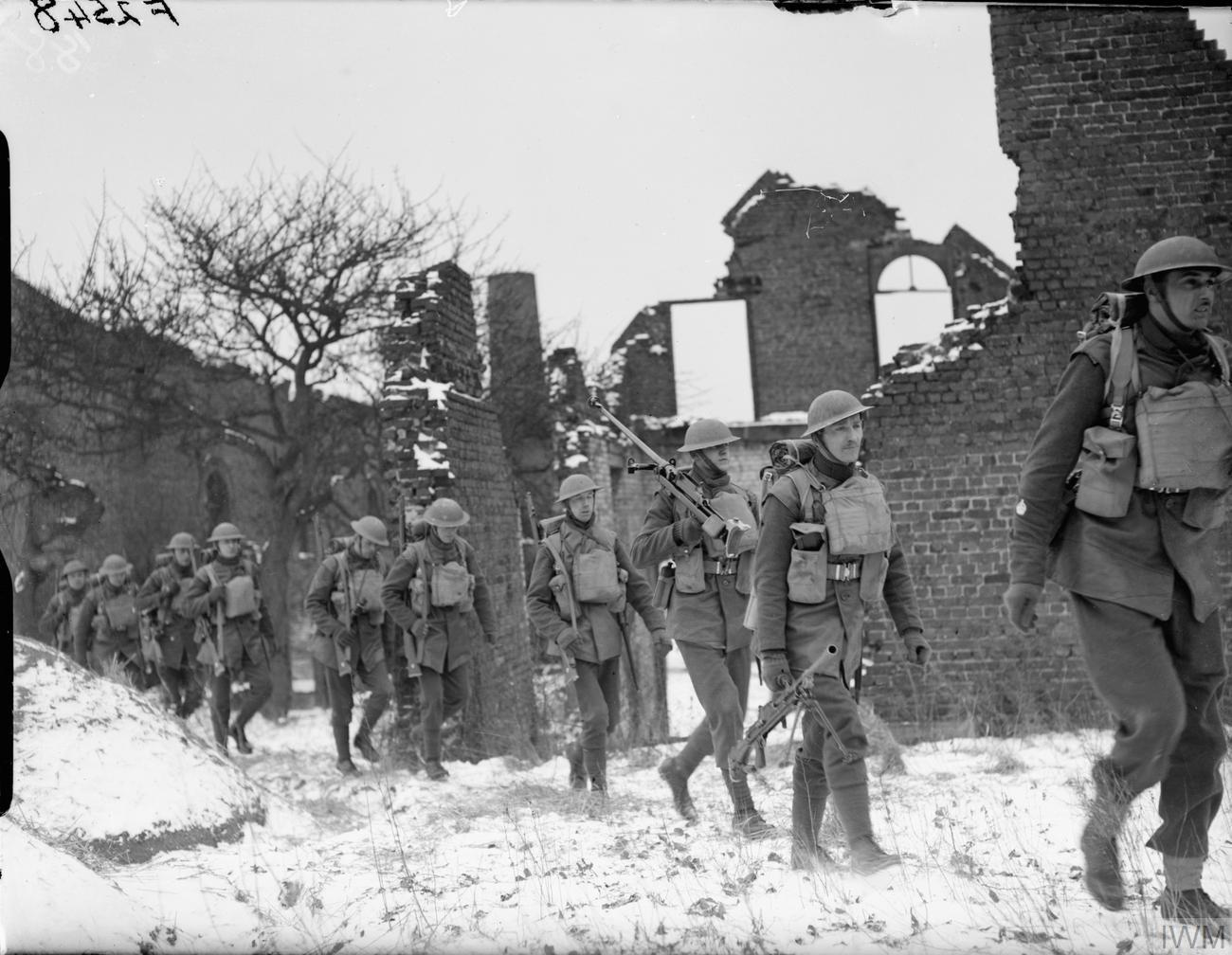
Men of 1st Battalion, Welsh Guards in Arras, France, 14 February 1940.

The 3rd Battalion, Welsh Guards, which was formed at Beavers Lane Camp in 1941, fought throughout the arduous North African Campaign, in the Tunisia Campaign and the Italian campaigns in 1943.

While they battled on in those theatres the 1st and 2nd joined the Guards Armoured Division, with the 1st Battalion being infantry, assigned to the 32nd Guards Brigade, and the 2nd Battalion being armoured, part of the 6th Guards Armoured Brigade. The two battalions worked closely, being the first troops to re-enter Brussels on 3 September 1944 after an advance of 100 miles in one day in what was described as 'an armoured lash unequalled for speed in this or any other war' led by Major-General Sir Allan Henry Adair, the divisional commander.

=== Postwar ===
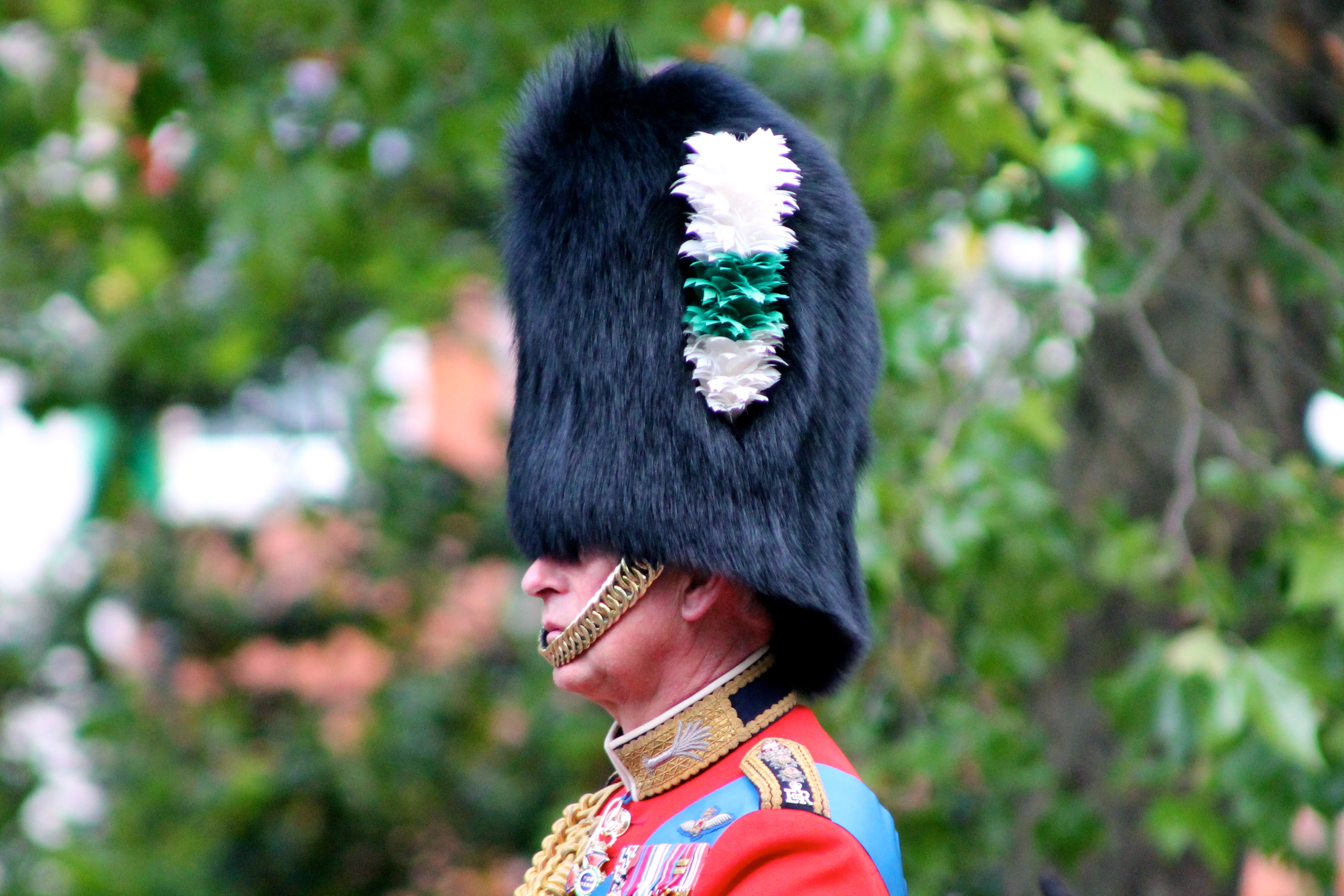
Charles, Prince of Wales, colonel of the regiment from 1975 to 2022, in Welsh Guards uniform at Trooping the Colour, 2012.

Shortly after the end of the war the 3rd Battalion was disbanded while the 2nd Battalion was placed in suspended animation. In 1947 the 1st Welsh Guards were dispatched to Palestine, then under British control, while it was in a volatile and violent situation. The Welsh Guards were part of the 1st Guards Brigade and performed internal security (IS) duties while there, before leaving in 1948 during the British withdrawal and when the state of Israel was declared. The regiment had its colour trooped for the first time in 1949.

In 1950, the regiment arrived in West Germany as part of the 4th Guards Brigade, part of the British Army of the Rhine (BAOR). In 1952 the regiment joined the Area Troops Berlin in West Berlin, an enclave in Communist East Germany during tense times between the North Atlantic Treaty Organization and the Warsaw Pact. The Welsh Guards returned home the following year and soon after deployed to the British-controlled Suez Canal Zone (SEZ) in Egypt. As previously in Palestine, the Welsh Guards' time in Egypt was quite turbulent. They performed internal security duties there, remaining in the SEZ until the British withdrawal in 1956.

In 1960, the regiment deployed to West Germany again, and in 1965 to Aden, another part of the declining British Empire. They returned home the following year. In 1970 the regiment arrived again in West Germany, this time at Münster, as part of 4th Armoured Brigade.

In 1972, came deployment to Northern Ireland, then embroiled in violence later known as "The Troubles". During its tour of duty the regiment lost Sergeant Phillip Price in an attack by the Provisional Irish Republican Army on the Oxford Street Bus Depot in Belfast, one of a series of bombings in the city which became known as "Bloody Friday". The following year the Welsh Guards were dispatched to the province again, and during this period lost Guardsman David Roberts in a landmine explosion.

Between October 1975 and March 1976 the Welsh Guards were part of the British contingent of the United Nations force deployed to Cyprus in the aftermath of the Turkish invasion of the island in 1974. In 1977 the regiment arrived in West Berlin again, and then in 1979 once more in the midst of the volatile situation in Northern Ireland, they lost Guardsman Paul Fryer to a booby-trap bomb. On 9 July 1981, Daniel Barrett, aged 15 years, was sitting on the garden wall of his home in Havana Court, Ardoyne, North Belfast, when he was shot dead by a soldier from the Welsh Guards.

=== Falklands War ===
In 1982, the Welsh Guards (CO Lieutenant-Colonel John Rickett) formed part of the 5th Infantry Brigade of the British Task Force sent to liberate the Falkland Islands from Argentinian occupation during the Falklands War. On 8 June they were on board the ill-fated Sir Galahad, which was accompanied by Sir Tristram, waiting to be landed at Bluff Cove though they were delayed from doing so. However, attack was imminent after the landing craft were spotted by Argentinian observers. At 2:00 am, five Dagger and five A-4 Skyhawk aircraft were seen over the Falklands. Shortly afterwards, the Daggers were the first to attack. Only a short time later, the Skyhawks reached Fitzroy, with three of the aircraft hitting the Sir Galahad two or more times with horrific consequences. Sir Tristram was also hit which killed two crewmen, both ships were ablaze. The attack on Sir Galahad culminated in high casualties, 48 dead, 32 of them Welsh Guards, 11 other Army personnel and five crewmen from Sir Galahad herself. There were many wounded, many suffering from horrendous burns caused by fire from the burning ships, the best known being Simon Weston. The burnt-out Sir Galahad was later scuttled at sea to allow her to become a war grave. On 13-14 June, the remainder of the battalion, reinforced by two companies of Royal Marines from 40 Commando, were given the objective of capturing Sapper Hill in the final stages of the Battle of Mount Tumbledown. Following a firefight at their helicopter landing zone, the force moved on to Sapper Hill but found it abandoned, thus taking the last defensible position before Stanley.

=== Since 1984 ===
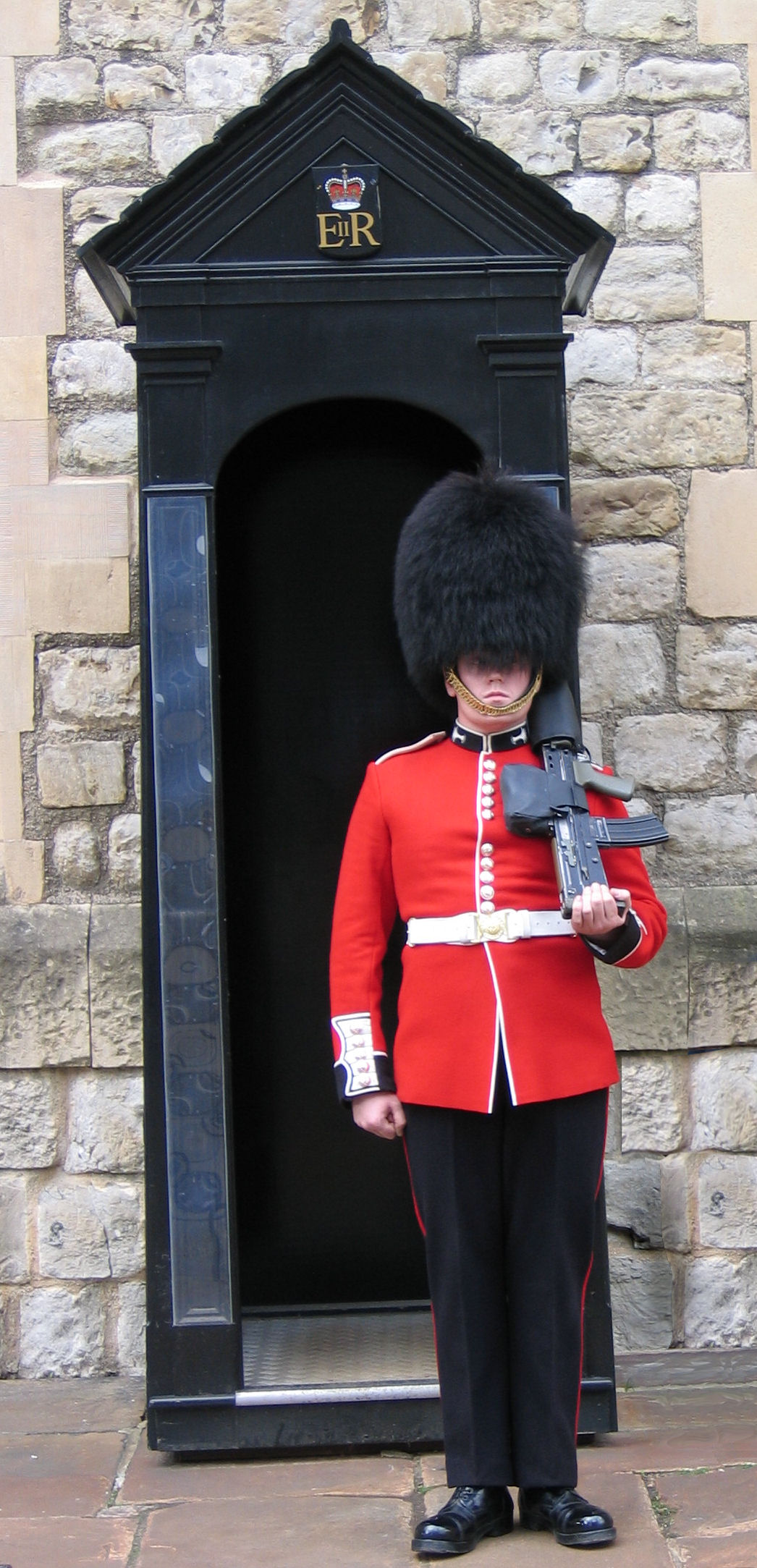
Welsh Guardsman outside the Jewel House at the Tower of London

In 1984, the Welsh Guards arrived in Hohne, West Germany as part of the 22nd Armoured Brigade and two years later arrived in Northern Ireland for another tour-of-duty before returning to Germany. The regiment returned home to Elizabeth Barracks, Pirbright in 1988. In 1989 The Welsh Guards conducted a six-month operational roulement Battalion tour of Belize from April to October 1989 and in 1992 arrived in Northern Ireland for a two-year deployment as part of 8th Infantry Brigade. During their tour of Northern Ireland the BBC filmed the documentary In the Company of Men by Molly Dineen, which filmed a deployment to the heavily nationalist County Fermanagh during the regiment's tour.

On 6 September 1997, 12 Guardsmen of the Welsh Guards led by the adjutant of the 1st Battalion, "The Prince of Wales" Company, Captain Richard Williams MC, hero in 1993 of the Khmer Rouge incident in which he was captured defending civilians in Cambodia, were pulled from security patrols in South Armagh, Northern Ireland and together with members of the King's Troop, Royal Horse Artillery escorted the casket of Diana, Princess of Wales, from Kensington Palace to Westminster Abbey.

In 2002, the regiment arrived in Bosnia as part of SFOR, a NATO-led force intended to ensure peace and stability in the Balkan nation. During their deployment the Queen Mother died. A number of officers of the Welsh Guards stood in vigil around the Queen Mother's coffin which was lying in state in Westminster Hall, one of a number of regiments to do so. The regiment returned home from its deployment to Bosnia later in the year. It was involved in Operation Fresco, the British armed forces response to the firefighters strike; the Welsh Guards covered the Midlands area, primarily in Birmingham using the antiquated Army "Green Goddess" fire engines.

In 2003, the Welsh Guards moved from Aldershot to RAF St Athan, Wales.

In 2005, the Welsh Guards were part of Operation Telic and were based in Basra, Southern Iraq. Here they used relationship-building skills learnt from their time in Bosnia to build a bond between the regiment and local people.

In 2006, the regiment returned to London as a public duties battalion. It will alternate this role with the Grenadier Guards. The regiment deployed to Bosnia in October 2006, replacing the 2nd Battalion, The Yorkshire Regiment. In November 2007, the regiment deployed to Belize at short notice to take part in jungle warfare training; they returned just before Christmas.

In 2008, the Welsh Guards moved from London to Lille Barracks in Aldershot, in preparation for deployment on Operation Herrick 10 in Afghanistan. The regiment departed in April 2009. Six members of the battalion were killed, among them a platoon commander, a company commander and the battalion commander. It was the first time since the Korean War that a single battalion had lost officers at these three key levels of leadership. The six-month tour was chronicled in the book Dead Men Risen; the Welsh Guards and the Defining Story of Britain's War in Afghanistan by Toby Harnden, which won the Orwell Prize for Books 2012.

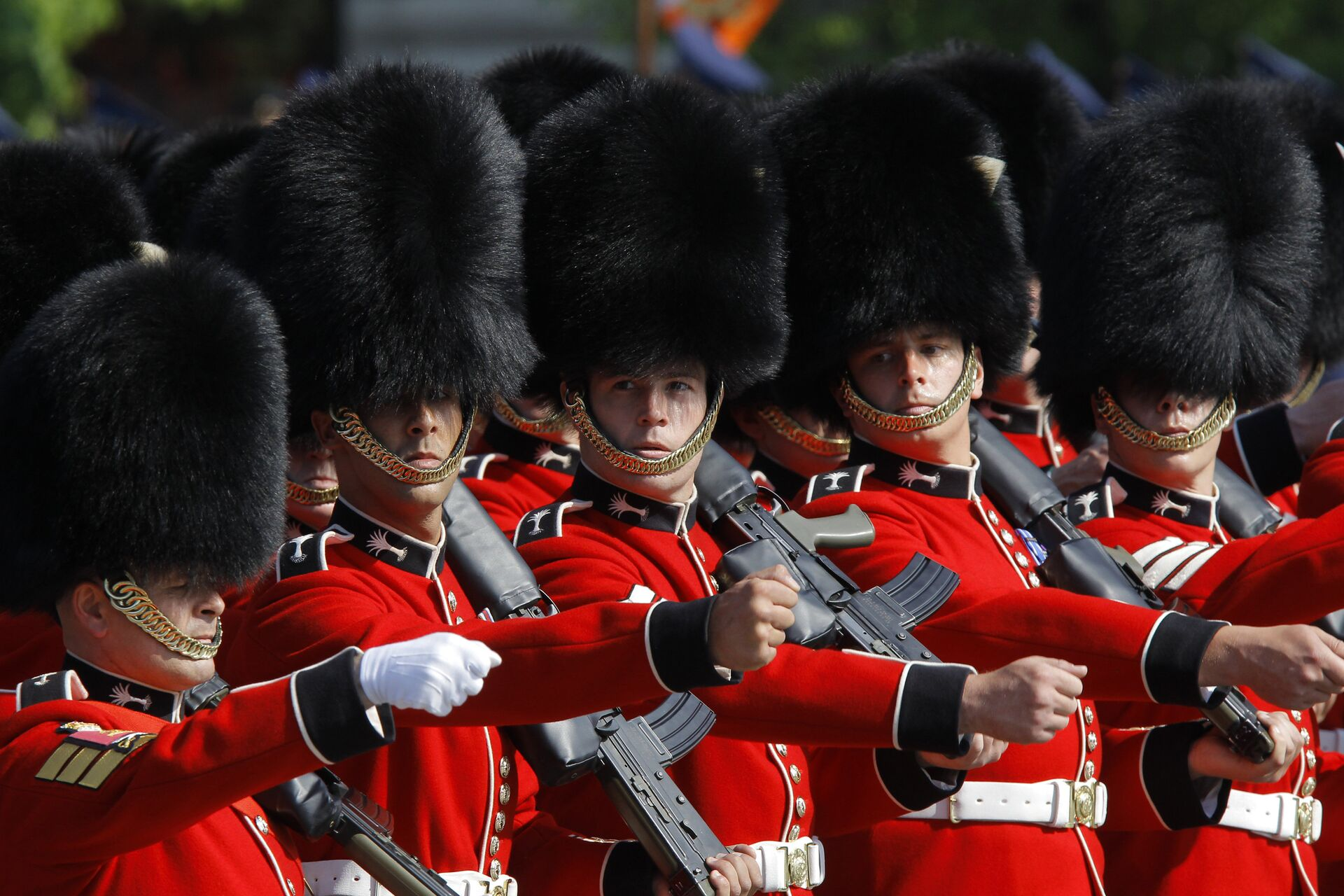
The Welsh Guards marching in the 2010 Moscow Victory Day Parade in Moscow, Russia.

On 1 July 2009, Lieutenant-Colonel Rupert Thorneloe MBE was killed along with Trooper Joshua Hammond of the 2nd Royal Tank Regiment, following the detonation of an IED in Afghanistan under their BvS 10 Viking during Operation Panther's Claw. Lieutenant-Colonel Thorneloe was the highest ranking British Army officer killed since Lieutenant-Colonel Herbert "H" Jones, VC OBE, in the Falkland Islands.

As a result of the Army 2020 Refine reforms, the battalion moved to Combermere Barracks which was the former home to the armoured regiment of the Household Cavalry.

== Museums ==
There are two museums with artefacts and memorabilia about the regiment. The Welsh Guards Museum is in Oswestry, Shropshire. The Guards Museum, in Wellington Barracks, London, is home of the five regiments of Foot Guards (the Grenadier Guards, Coldstream Guards, Scots Guards, Irish Guards, and Welsh Guards).

== Training ==
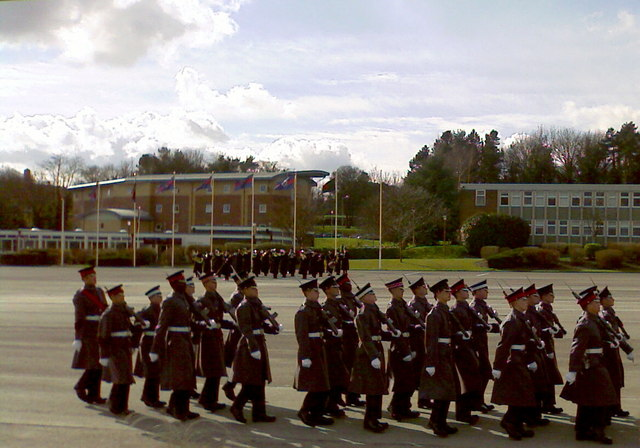
Recruits practising drill on Catterick parade square

Recruits to the Guards Division go through a grueling training programme at the Infantry Training Centre (ITC). The training is two weeks more than the training for the Regular line infantry regiments of the British Army; the extra training, carried out throughout the course, is devoted to drill and ceremonies.

== Colonels-in-Chief ==
King George V assumed the colonelcy-in-chief of the regiment on its formation, and subsequent monarchs have also been colonel-in-chief.

- 1915–1936: King George V
- Jan 1936–Dec 1936: King Edward VIII
- 1936–1952: King George VI
- 1952–2022: Queen Elizabeth II
- 2022–present: King Charles III

== Regimental Colonels ==
Regimental colonels have been:

- 1919–1936: General Edward, Prince of Wales
- 1937–1942: Colonel William Murray Threipland
- 1942–1953: Brigadier-General Alexander Hore-Ruthven, 1st Earl of Gowrie
- 1953–1975: Field Marshal Prince Philip, Duke of Edinburgh
- 1975–2022: Field Marshal Charles, Prince of Wales
- 2022–present: Lieutenant Colonel William, Prince of Wales

== Regimental Lieutenant Colonels ==
The Regimental Lieutenant Colonels have included:

- 1915–1917: Col. The Lord Harlech
- 1917–1920: Col. William Murray Threipland
- 1920–1924: Col. The Hon. Alexander G. A. Hore-Ruthven
- 1924–1928: Col. T. R. C. Price
- 1928–1934: Col. R. E. K. Leatham
- 1934–1938: Col. Merton Beckwith-Smith
- 1938–1939: Col. William A. F. L. Fox-Pitt
- 1939–?: Col. R. E. K. Leatham
- 1957–1960: Col. Henry C. L. Dimsdale
- 1960–1964: Col. Charles A. T. Leatham
- 1964–1967: Col. Mervyn C. Thursby-Pelham
- 1967–1972: Col. Vivian G. Wallace
- 1972–1976: Col. James W. T. Malcolm
- 1976–1978: Col. Michael R. Lee
- 1978–1982: Col. Samuel C. C. Gaussen
- 1982–1987: Col. David R. P. Lewis
- 1987–1989: Lt.-Col. Charles J. Dawnay
- 1989–1994: Brig. John F. Rickett
- 1994–2000: Maj.-Gen. Christopher F. Drewry
- 2000–2005: Maj.-Gen. C. Redmond Watt
- 2005–2010: Col. Alexander J. E. Malcolm
- 2010–2015: Maj.-Gen. Robert H. Talbot Rice
- 2015–2021: Maj.-Gen. Richard J. A. Stanford
- 2021–2025: Col. G. R. Harris
- 2025–present: Brig. David Bevan

== Traditions and affiliations ==
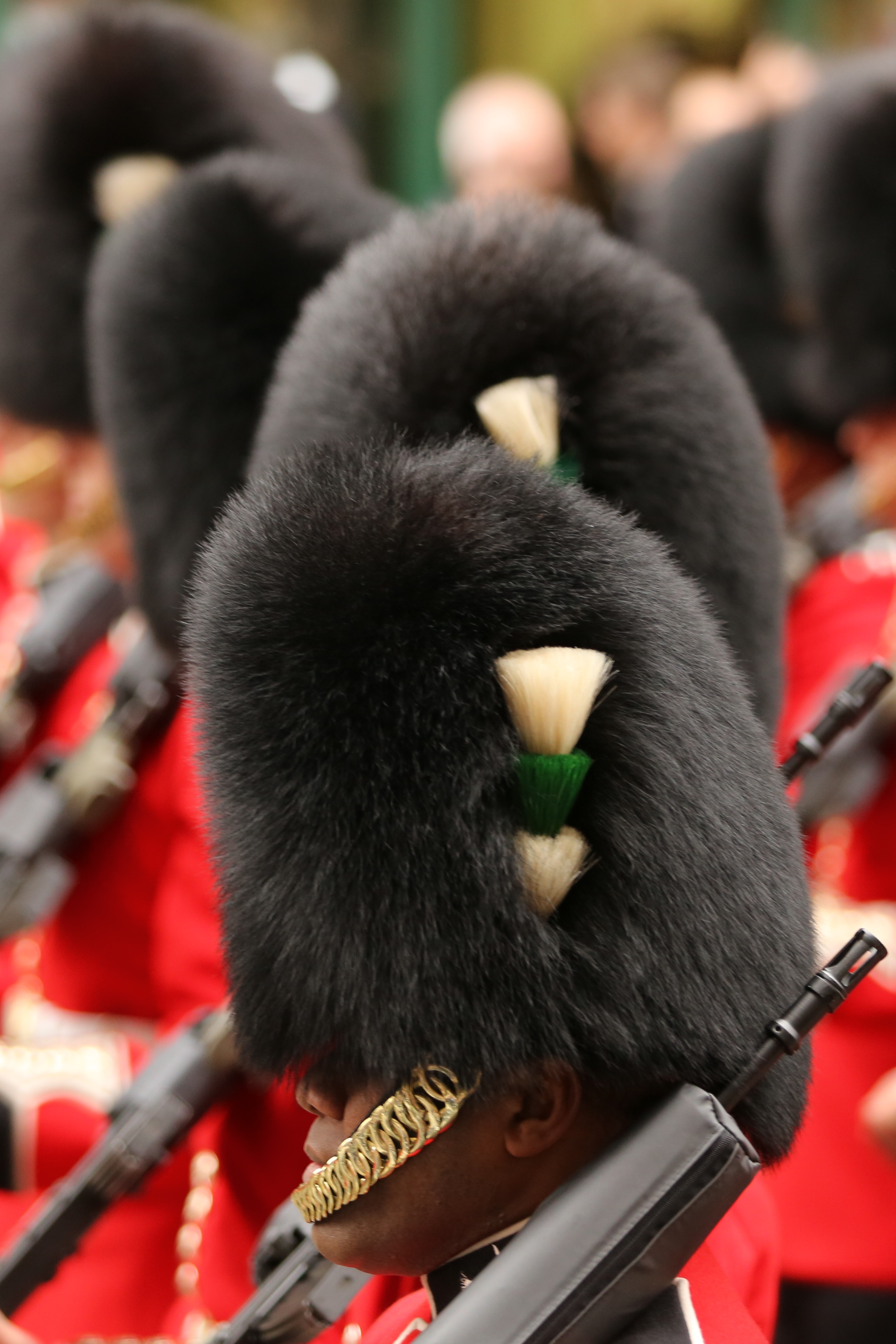
Welsh Guardsmen in full dress are distinguished by the white/green/white plume on their bearskins

The Welsh Guards and other Guards regiments have a long-standing connection to The Parachute Regiment. Guardsman who have completed P company are transferred into the Guards Parachute Platoon which is currently attached to 3 PARA, maintaining a tradition of the No 1 (Guards) Independent Parachute Company—the original Pathfinder Group of the 16th Parachute Brigade, now renamed the 16th Air Assault Brigade.

The 3rd Battalion the Royal Welsh from the Army Reserve is paired with 1st Battalion Welsh Guards and will deploy on future Operations with them.

One way to distinguish between the regiments of Foot Guards is the spacing of buttons on the tunic. The Welsh Guards, the fifth regiment in seniority, have buttons arranged in groups of five. The other distinctive feature of their uniform is the presence of a white, green and white plume (hackle), worn on the left side of the bearskin.

In 1810, the British Army introduced metal rank insignia for field officers (majors and colonels) and generals. This was an arrangement of Stars and Crowns. The "Star" (nicknamed a "pip" in line regiments) was actually a raised diamond shape similar to the Knight Grand Cross star of the Order of the Garter. In 1855 metal insignia was introduced for subaltern officers (lieutenants and captains) and the star was changed to that of the Order of the Bath. In 1855 the Grenadier Guards and Coldstream Guards were granted Order of the Garter stars and the Scots-Fusilier Guards received Order of the Thistle stars for their service in the Crimean War. In 1919 the Irish Guards and Welsh Guards, the two newest regiments of the Brigade of Guards, received distinctive stars of their own for their service in World War One. The Irish Guards were granted the Order of St Patrick and the Welsh Guards were granted the Order of the Garter.

== Battle honours ==
The Welsh Guards have been awarded the following battle honours:

First World War

Loos, Somme 1916 '18, Ginchy, Flers Courcelette, Morval, Ypres 1917, Pilckem, Poelcappelle, Passchendaele, Cambrai 1917 '18, Bapaume 1918, Arras 1918, Albert 1918, Drocourt-Quéant, Hindenburg Line, Havrincourt, Canal Du Nord, Selle, Sambre, France and Flanders 1915–18

Second World War

Defence of Arras, Boulogne 1940, St Omer-La Bassée, Bourguébus Ridge, Cagny, Mont Pincon, Brussels, Hechtel, Nederrijn, Rhineland, Lingen, North-West Europe 1940 '44–45, Fondouk, Djebel el Rhorab, Tunis, Hammam Lif, North Africa 1943, Monte Ornito, Liri Valley, Monte Piccolo, Capture of Perugia, Arezzo, Advance to Florence, Gothic Line, Battaglia, Italy 1944–45

Post Second World War

Falkland Islands 1982

== Victoria Cross recipients ==
- Sergeant Robert Bye, 1st Battalion, The Welsh Guards
- Lieutenant Christopher Furness, 1st Battalion, The Welsh Guards

== Order of precedence ==
Preceded by Irish Guards	Infantry Order of Precedence	Succeeded by Royal Regiment of Scotland

== Alliances ==
- Australia – 5th Battalion, Royal Australian Regiment
- Royal Navy – HMS Prince of Wales

== See also ==
- Band of the Welsh Guards
