= William Murray Threipland =

Colonel William Murray Threipland DSO DL JP (December 1866 – 24 June 1942) was a British Army officer. He was appointed the founding colonel commanding of the Welsh Guards in February 1915, and was the regiment's Colonel from March 1937.

He was born William Scott Kerr, but adopted the surname of Murray Threipland on 30 April 1882, following his inheritance of the estates of his cousin, Sir Patrick Murray Threipland, 5th Baronet. These included Fingask Castle in Perthshire, and Dale House in Caithness. He was commissioned as a lieutenant into the 3rd (Militia) Battalion of the Black Watch (Royal Highlanders) (later the Black Watch) in January 1885. He transferred over to the Regular Army when he was commissioned into the Grenadier Guards as a second lieutenant on 28 May 1887, promoted to lieutenant on 5 May 1892, and took part in the Sudan Campaign in 1898, following which he was promoted to captain on 23 October 1898.

He served in South Africa during the Second Boer War 1900–1902; he was part of a detachment sent to South Africa in March 1900 to reinforce the 3rd Battalion of his regiment. After the end of the war, he retired from the Grenadier Guards in July 1902. On 28 August 1909, Murray Threipland was appointed a deputy lieutenant of Caithness.

On 26 February 1915, Murray Threipland, promoted to the temporary rank of major in October 1914, having been interviewed by Lord Kitchener and King George V, was appointed to command a new Guards Regiment. The first battalion of the Welsh Guards was officially formed the following day, with Murray Threipland in command. He was given the rank of lieutenant colonel. Murray Threipland commanded the Welsh Guards at the battle of Loos the same year. He was awarded the Distinguished Service Order (DSO) on 3 June 1916. He was appointed colonel on 12 March 1937.

Murray Threipland was deputy lieutenant of Roxburgh. He married in 1899 Charlotte Eleanor, co-heiress of William Wyndham Lewis. Murray Threipland died on 24 June 1942. His daughter-in-law, wife of his son Patrick, was the archaeologist Leslie Scott.
