= RMS Rangitiki =

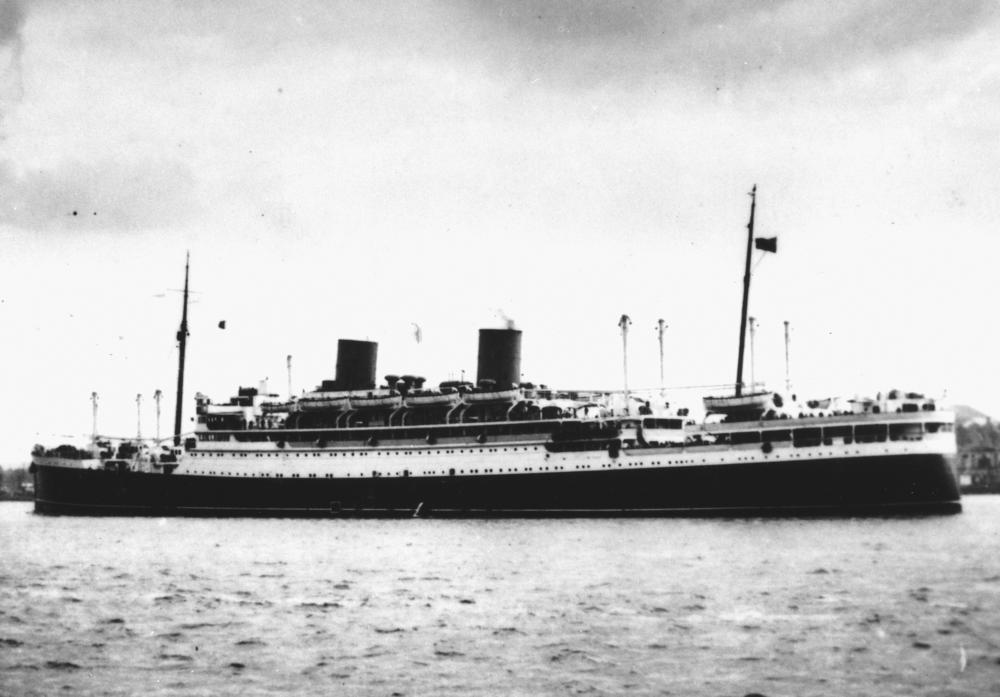
- RMS Rangitiki

History

United Kingdom
- Name: Rangitiki
- Owner: New Zealand Shipping Company
- Port of registry: Plymouth
- Route: Britain – New Zealand
- Ordered: 16 August 1927
- Builder: John Brown & Company, Clydebank
- Yard number: 516
- Launched: 27 August 1928
- Acquired: 31 January 1929
- Maiden voyage: 5 February 1929
- Out of service: 13 July 1962
- Fate: Scrapped October 1962

General characteristics
- Tonnage: 16,698 GRT, 10,266 NRT
- Length: 531.0 ft (161.8 m)
- Beam: 70.2 ft (21.4 m)
- Draught: 33.8 ft (10.3 m)
- Depth: 38.1 ft (11.6 m)
- Installed power: 9,300 hp (6,900 kW), 2,186 NHP
- Propulsion: Two Brown Sulzer S90 engines driving twin screws
- Speed: 15 kn (28 km/h; 17 mph)
- Capacity: 598 (1st class: 100, 2nd class: 80, 3rd class: 418)

RMS Rangitiki was a passenger liner owned by the New Zealand Shipping Company. She was one of three sister ships (the other sisters were Rangitata and Rangitane) delivered to the company in 1929 for the route between Britain and New Zealand. Rangitiki was built by John Brown & Company at Clydebank, Scotland and launched on 27 August 1928.

Rangitiki measured just under 16,700 gross register tons, her registered length was 531.0 ft (161.8 m) and her beam was 70.2 feet (21.4 m). She carried 598 passengers in 1st, 2nd and 3rd classes and had refrigerated cargo space of 418,700 cubic feet (11,860 m^{3}). The ship was powered by two Brown-Sulzer type diesel engines with a total output of 9,300 hp (6,900 kW), turning twin propellers.

== Service history ==
Ordered in 1927, Rangitiki was launched in 1928 and entered service with the New Zealand Shipping Company in 1929 sailing between Great Britain and New Zealand on the route via the Panama Canal.

At the start of the Second World War the ship was used for transporting children from Britain to Australia before being converted into a troopship. In November 1940 Rangitiki was the largest ship in Convoy HX 84 when the convoy was attacked by the German cruiser Admiral Scheer. Rangitiki and most other ships in the convoy escaped due to the actions of escort Captain Edward Fegen, commander of HMS Jervis Bay, who sacrificed himself and his ship to give the merchant ships the time to get away. Rangitiki was straddled twice by German heavy shells, but was then obscured by a smoke screen laid by the other ships and escaped without any casualties amongst her 230 crew and 25 passengers, including women and children. Among the passengers were anthropologists Raymond Firth and Rosemary Firth. Her radio officer was able to transmit a warning signal that was picked up and repeated by a station in Long Island. The following month the Rangitiki had another close shave when sailing as part of Convoy WS 5, the convoy was attacked by German cruiser Admiral Hipper.

Returned to service between Britain, Australia and New Zealand in 1945 the Rangitiki carried numerous servicemen home from Britain as well a number of war brides. Following an extensive refit in 1947–48 the ship was then used by the New Zealand Shipping Company and continued in service until July 1962 when after 87 peacetime return voyages between Britain and New Zealand it was withdrawn. Sold for scrap, Rangitiki sailed to Spain and was broken up in Valencia in October 1962.

== Modifications in service ==
Both before and after its maiden voyage the ship was found to have stability issues especially when sailing in ballast so modifications including reducing the height of the ship by removing most of the bridge deck, shortening the funnels and adding more permanent ballast were made.

During the refit in 1947–48 the John Brown built Sulzer type engines were replaced with two Doxford diesel engines with a total power output of 12,920 hp (9,630 kW) raising the ships maximum speed to 16 kn (30 km/h; 18 mph). At the same time passenger capacity was reduced to 405.
