= Nigel McNair Scott =

British businessman (1945–2023)

- Born: Nigel Guthrie McNair Scott; 6 September 1945; Huish, Hampshire, England
- Died: 7 April 2023 (aged 77); Winchester, Hampshire, England
- Education: Eton College; Christ Church, Oxford (BA)
- Occupations: Businessman, landowner
- Spouse: Anna Colquhoun (m. 1968)
- Children: 4
- Relatives: 1st Viscount Camrose (maternal grandfather); Leslie Scott (aunt)

Nigel Guthrie McNair Scott (6 September 1945 – 7 April 2023) was a British businessman and landowner. He served as finance director and later chairman of the property company Helical Bar (now Helical), co-founded the mining company Avocet Mining, and chaired the aerospace company Reaction Engines.

== Early life and education ==
McNair Scott was born on 6 September 1945 to Major Ronald Guthrie McNair Scott and the Hon. Mary Cecilia Berry, daughter of newspaper proprietor William Berry, 1st Viscount Camrose. He grew up at Huish in Hampshire, bordering his grandfather's estate at Hackwood Park. His aunt was the archaeologist Leslie Scott.

He attended Eton College and went on to read philosophy, politics and economics at Christ Church, Oxford, graduating with a second-class degree. At Oxford, he met Anna Colquhoun, the daughter of an Eton housemaster; they married in 1968 and had four sons.

== Career ==
McNair Scott qualified as an accountant with Dixon Wilson before joining Charter Consolidated, where he worked in the property division. He also served on the board of the precious metals company Johnson Matthey.

In 1974, alongside Michael Slade, he acquired control of an engineering firm and restructured it into the commercial property developer Helical Bar. He served as the company's finance director for more than two decades and as its chairman from 2012 to 2016. In the mining sector, he co-founded Avocet Mining to develop tungsten assets and oversaw gold exploration projects in Malaysia.

McNair Scott was also an early investor in and chairman of Reaction Engines, an Oxfordshire aerospace company developing the SABRE rocket engine and hypersonic propulsion systems.

== Public service and later life ==
Following his father's death in 1995, McNair Scott returned to Hampshire to manage the family estate at Old Basing. He was appointed High Sheriff of Hampshire for 2011–2012 and also served as a Deputy Lieutenant of the county.

His charitable roles included serving as treasurer of the British Dyslexia Association, an honorary vice-admiral of the Mary Rose Trust, and a trustee or fundraiser for Winchester Cathedral Trust, the Grange Festival, the Hackwood Arts Trust, and the Royal Marsden Hospital.

McNair Scott died at the Royal Hampshire County Hospital in Winchester on 7 April 2023, aged 77, following an accidental fall at his home in Old Basing.
