= Rosemary Firth =

British social anthropologist

Rosemary, Lady Firth (1912 – 8 July 2001) was a British social anthropologist, and wife of Sir Raymond Firth. She specialised in the field of domestic economy.

== Life ==
Rosemary Firth (née Upcott) was born in 1912 in London. Her father, Sir Gilbert Charles Upcott, was a distinguished official in the Treasury, holding the position of Comptroller and Auditor General from 1931 to 1946. Firth took a Political Economy degree (MA) in Edinburgh in 1935, and then moved to London. She married Raymond Firth in 1936, and accompanied him to Kelantan in Malaya to undertake fieldwork from 1939 to 1940; Rosemary focused on the domestic economy of the female villagers. On their return to the UK from Malaya in November 1940 the Firths were aboard the RMS Rangitiki, part of Convoy HX 84, when it was attacked by the Germans. From 1940 to 1946 Firth researched supply and demand for the Board of Trade; she wrote up her Malayan research at the same time and published it in 1943 as Housekeeping among Malay Peasants.

The Firths' only child, Hugh, was born in 1946. Following this, Rosemary did not undertake paid employment again until 1961. She took a course in Social Administration at LSE starting in October 1959, followed by various social work placements away from home. On completion in 1961 she started teaching health education at Battersea College. In 1963 the Firths revisited Kelantan in Malaya to observe changes in the 24 years since their last fieldwork. In 1966 she became lecturer in health education at the University of London Institute of Education for many years, whilst continuing her anthropological research interests. She retired in 1978.

When her husband was knighted in 1973, Rosemary took the title Lady Firth. She died on 8 July 2001. Following her death, Sir Raymond established The Rosemary and Raymond Firth Award in the Department of Anthropology at the London School of Economics. This award has the specific aim of promoting Rosemary's interest in 'the anthropology of household management and the organisation of domestic affairs'.

Following her death and that of Sir Raymond in February 2002, the Firths' ashes were interred on 7 June 2002 at the parish church of Thorncombe, West Dorset, where the Firths had had a cottage (Holway Cottage) since 1937.

The Firth anthropological research papers were deposited at the London School of Economics. A note from Rosemary directed their son Hugh to a store of more personal papers, which revealed that Rosemary had been in a secretive later-life affair with her first love, anthropologist Edmund Leach, whom she had first met when she was 16. The letters and papers were published in a 2023 book, Love, Loyalty and Deceit: Rosemary Firth, a Life in the Shadow of Two Eminent Men, co-authored by Hugh Firth and Loulou Brown, Edmund Leach's daughter.

== Selected bibliography ==
- 1943. Housekeeping among Malay Peasants, London: Athlone Press (1966 2nd edition).
- 1969. 'Examination and ritual initiation', in Joseph Lauweys & David G. Sanlon eds, The World Year Book of Education: Examinations, London: Routledge, pp. 235–242.
- 1970. 'The social images of man and woman', Journal of Biosocial Science, Supplement 2, pp. 85–92.
- 1972. "From wife to anthropologist", in Solon T. Kimball & James B. Watson eds, Crossing Cultural Boundaries: The Anthropological Experience, San Francisco: Chandler, pp. 10–32.
- 1974. "The best circle: Society, etiquette and the season", Sociology 8:2, pp. 339–340.
- 1976. "Anthropologists in the lions' den?", Current Anthropology 17:4, pp. 770–771.
- 1977. "Routines in a tropical diseases hospital", in Alan Davies & Gordon Horobin eds, Medical Encounters: The Experience of Illness and Treatment, London: Crook Helm, pp. 143–158.
- 1977. "Cooking in a Kelantan fishing village, Malaya", in Jessica Kuper ed., The Anthropologist's Cookbook, London: Routledge, pp. 183–190.
- 1978. "Medical sociology and anthropology: A necessary dialogue", Social Science and Medicine 12b, p. 235.
- 1978. "Social anthropology and medicine—A personal perspective", Social Science and Medicine 12b, pp. 237–245.
- 1990. "A Cambridge undergraduate: Some early letters from Edmund Leach", Cambridge Anthropology 13:3, pp. 9–18.
- 1995. "Prologue: A woman looks back on the anthropology of women and feminist anthropology', in Wazir Jahan Karim ed., 'Male' and 'Female' in Developing Southeast Asia, Oxford: Berg, pp. 3–10.
- 1997. "Mad dogs, Englishmen and the errant anthropologist: Field work in Malaysia", Journal of the Royal Anthropological Institute 3:4, pp. 795–796.
