= Modernization theory (nationalism) =

Nationalism is distinctly modern

Modernization theory is the predominant explanation for the emergence of nationalism among scholars of nationalism. Prominent modernization scholars, such as Benedict Anderson, Ernest Gellner and Eric Hobsbawm, say nationalism arose with modernization during the late 18th century. Processes that lead to the emergence of nationalism include industrialization and democratic revolutions.

Modernization theory stands in contrast to primordialism, which hold that nations are biological, innate phenomena, and ethnosymbolism, which emphasizes their pre-modern roots.

== Important theorists ==
=== Early antecedents ===
Scholar Carlton J. H. Hayes is considered a precursor to the later modernist theorists. Hayes wrote in 1931: "We can be sure that prior to the eighteenth century A.D. it was not the general rule for civilized nationalities to strive zealously and successfully for political unity and independence, whereas it has been the general rule in the last century and a half. Universal mass-nationalism of this kind, at any rate, has no counterpart in earlier eras; it is peculiar to modern times".

=== Benedict Anderson ===
Anderson is best known for his 1983 book Imagined Communities, in which he argues nations are socially constructed. For Anderson, the idea of the "nation" is relatively new and is a product of various socio-material forces, defined as "an imagined political community – and imagined as both inherently limited and sovereign".

However, imagining does not imply falsity. As he puts it, a nation is "imagined" because "the members of even the smallest nation will never know most of their fellow-members, meet them, or even hear of them, yet in the minds of each lives the image of their communion", they are "limited" in that they have "finite, if elastic boundaries, beyond which lie other nations", and they are "sovereign" since no dynastic monarchy can claim authority over them in the modern period. He notes:

Regardless of the actual inequality and exploitation that may prevail in each, the nation is always conceived as a deep, horizontal comradeship. Ultimately it is this fraternity that makes it possible, over the past two centuries, for so many millions of people, not so much to kill, as willingly to die for such limited imaginings.

Anderson argues nations and nationalism were born in an age in which Enlightenment and Revolution were destroying the legitimacy of the divinely-ordained, hierarchical dynastic realm. Coming to maturity at a stage of human history when even the most devout adherents of any universal religion were inescapably confronted with the living pluralism of such religions, and the allomorphism [incongruence, divide] between each faith's ontological claims and territorial stretch, nations dream of being free, and, if under God, directly so. The gauge and emblem of this freedom is the sovereign state.

Although members of an imagined community will never know most of their fellow-members, interaction between a system of production and productive relations, innovations in communications technology, and the fatality of human diversity enable the development of national consciousness.

In contrast to modernists who trace the first nationalist movements to Europe, Anderson argues creole communities of the Americas developed national consciousnesses before most of Europe. Unlike in Europe, however, Anderson states language development did not play an important role in their formation, and these movements were led by creole elites and not by the intelligentsia.

=== Ernest Gellner ===
Gellner defined nationalism as "primarily a political principle which holds that the political and the national unit should be congruent". Like Anderson, Gellner argues nations and nationalism are distinctly modern phenomena, and links them to industrialization. He posits that, in the pre-modern world, power and culture did not "have much inclination to come together" and thus there was no incentive for rulers to impose cultural homogeneity on their subjects.

Industrial societies, however, are characterized by high levels of social mobility and roles are no longer ascribed as in previous societies. As such, this entails:

the general imposition of a high culture on society, where previously low cultures had taken up the lives of the majority, and in some cases the totality, of the population. It means the general diffusion of a school-mediated, academy supervised idiom, codified for the requirements of a reasonably precise bureaucratic and technological communication. It is the establishment of an anonymous impersonal society, with mutually sustainable atomised individuals, held together above all by a shared culture of this kind, in place of the previous complex structure of local groups, sustained by folk cultures reproduced locally and idiosyncratically by the micro-groups themselves.

In other words, industrialization creates a need for impersonal, context-free communication and a high level of cultural standardization.

Thomas Hylland Eriksen identifies these central features of nationalism in Gellner's theory:

1. Shared, formal educational system
2. Cultural homogenisation and "social entropy"
3. Central monitoring of polity, with extensive bureaucratic control
4. Linguistic standardisation
5. National identification as abstract community
6. Cultural similarity as a basis for political legitimacy
7. Anonymity, single-stranded social relationships

=== Eric Hobsbawm ===
Hobsbawm agrees with Gellner's definition of nationalism, but focuses more explicitly on the role of politics in its diffusion. He observes how "the modern nation, either as a state or as a body of people aspiring to form such a state, differs in size, scale and nature from the actual communities with which human beings have identified over most of history, and makes quite different demands on them".

Hobsbawm sees nations and nationalism as 'invented traditions'. That is, they are "a set of practices, normally governed by overtly or tacitly accepted rules and of a ritual or symbolic nature, which seek to inculcate certain values and norms of behaviour by repetition, which automatically implies continuity with the past".

Despite being modern inventions, Hobsbawm observes how nations claim continuity with history and use this as a legitimator of action and cement group cohesion. This continuity, however, is largely factitious and was a strategy adopted by the ruling elites to counter the threat posed by mass democracy. He argues nationalism was "so unprecedented that even historic continuity had to be invented [...] by creating an ancient past beyond effective historical continuity". Hobsbawm emphasizes the role of institutions in shaping these histories, noting how national history is not so much what has been preserved in popular memory, but what has been "selected, written, pictured, popularized and institutionalized by those whose function it is to do so". According to Özkirimli, Hobsbawm argues nationalism became a new secular religion achieving social cohesion through the development of primary education, invention of public ceremonies and holidays, and the mass production of public monuments.

In contrast to the ethnosymbolists, Hobsbawm believes nationalism precedes nations.

== Criticism ==
Ethnosymbolist critics such as Anthony D. Smith and Philip Gorski argue that, contrary to the assertions of the modernists, nationalism did exist prior to modernity, although this view has itself been criticized.

Critics like Adria Lawrence have argued that modernization theory's applicability to nationalism in European colonies is limited, as more modernized colonies did not undergo nationalist mobilization earlier.

Likewise, Anderson's specific contention that national liberation movements in the Americas constitute the earliest examples of modern nationalism has also been challenged by Adrian Hastings, Liah Greenfeld and Elie Kedourie. Anderson dismissed such criticisms as Eurocentric. In turn, Hastings responded that Anderson does not explain why the first wave of nation-making was the American nor why "the growth in books did not have in the sixteenth century the effect he postulates for the late eighteenth".

Fellow modernist John Breuilly criticizes Anderson as well for underestimating the political dimension of nationalism, and exaggerating the importance of cultural nationalism in nineteenth century Europe. For Breuilly, Anderson neglects the lack of congruence between ‘cultural’ and ‘political’ nationalism in certain contexts, citing the unification of Germany as one in which political unification was not accompanied by a ‘cultural’ unification.

According to Umut Özkırımlı, Breuilly accepts the "cultural dimension is important for understanding nationalism, but adds that this dimension can only explain why certain small groups might be disposed to imagine themselves as a nation and act politically on the basis of this assumption". Further, to Breuilly, Anderson’s theory cannot answer why those groups are important or why anyone in power or in the society take these arguments seriously.

Gellner's theory has also been subject to various criticisms. Tambini argues it is too functionalist, as it explains the phenomenon with reference to the outcome. That is, that industrial society could not 'function' without nationalism. Anthony D Smith has argued Gellner's theory misreads the relationship between nationalism and industrialization and fails to account for either nationalism in non-industrial society and resurgences of nationalism in post-industrial society.

Similarly, Smith criticizes Gellner for tying nationalism to modernity, thus failing to account for nationalism in 16th-century Europe and perceived "national" movements of Ancient Rome and Greece.

Daniele Conversi believes Gellner ignores the role of war and the military in fostering cultural homogenization and nationalism, as well as the relationship between militarism and compulsory education.

== See also ==
- Primordialism
- Gellner's theory of nationalism
- Ethnosymbolism
- Miroslav Hroch
- Modernization theory
- Nationalism studies
- Social constructivism
