= Ethnosymbolism =

Theory of nationalism

Ethnosymbolism is a school of thought in the study of nationalism that stresses the importance of symbols, myths, values and traditions in the formation and persistence of the modern nation state.

Developed as a critique of modernist theories of nationalism, ethnosymbolism emphasizes historical roots of nations in drawing on ethnic symbols, myths, values and traditions inherited from earlier ages. Like the modernists, and in contrast to primordialists, ethnosymbolist scholars agree nationalism is a distinctly modern phenomena.

The term was first used as "ethno-symbolist approach" in an article by Daniele Conversi, Smith's former student at the London School of Economics. However, Conversi was slightly critical, arguing: "if we focus exclusively on the power of the past and its symbols, we miss two other key features of nationalism: first, its relationship with political power, and particularly with the state; second, its crucial border-generating function".

John A. Armstrong, Anthony D. Smith and John Hutchinson are commonly regarded as key theorists of ethnosymbolism.

== Important theorists ==
=== John A. Armstrong ===
Armstrong's contribution to ethnosymbolism is his “myth-symbol complexes” in Nations before Nationalism (1982), which was the first to underline the significance of la longue durée, according to Anthony D. Smith. Armstrong believes that ethnic consciousness can far back in ancient civilisations such as Egypt, and that nationalism is merely "the final stage of a larger cycle of ethnic consciousness reaching back to the earliest forms of collective organization". Therefore, similar to the longue durée of Annales School, formation of ethnic identity should be examined across a timespan of many centuries.

Drawing on the work of Fredrik Barth, Armstrong argues that "groups tend to define themselves not by reference to their own characteristics but by exclusion, that is, by comparison to 'strangers'". In other words, the character of a group is never fixed, and in accordance with group member's individual perceptions the boundaries of identities vary. Armstrong contrasts this to modern nationalist thought, which "has sought permanent "essences" of national character instead of recognizing the fundamental but shifting significance of boundaries for human identity". Despite these pursuits, Armstrong maintains that, historically, "persistent group identity did not ordinarily constitute the overriding legitimization of polity formation".

Nonetheless, for Armstrong, "myth, symbol, communication and cluster of associated attitudinal factors are usually more persistent than purely material factors", indicating his emphasis on the persistence of symbolic boundary mechanisms. He specified and analysed several factors that ensure such persistence.

The first such factor, also the most general one, is ways of life and the experiences associated with them. There are two fundamentally different ways of life: the nomadic and the sedentary. The second factor is religion, exemplified by Christianity and Islam, both of which gave birth to different civilizations and myths/symbols. The third factor is city formation, whose effect upon ethnic identification requires examination of a host of factors ranging from the impact of town planning to the unifying of centrifugal effects of various legal codes, especially the Lübeck and Magdeburg law. The fourth factor is the role of imperial polities in maintaining myth-symbol complexes across dispersed geographical spaces. The final factor is language. Uniquely, Armstrong concludes that "the significance of language for ethnic identity is highly contingent" in the pre-modern era. Its significance relied on political and religious force and allegiances for centuries.

In his later works, Armstrong more explicitly agreed with modernists like Benedict Anderson and Eric Hobsbawm that national identity had been an invention, although he maintained an emphasis on "the antiquity of some inventions and the repertory of pre-existing group characteristics that inventors were able to draw upon".

=== Anthony D. Smith ===
A former student of the prominent modernist Ernest Gellner, Anthony D. Smith developed a distinct perspective from his teacher, best exemplified in the so-called "LSE debate" on nationalism (named by Gellner). Smith argues the "modern state cannot be understood without taking pre-existing ethnic components into account, the lack of which is likely to create a serious impediment to 'nation-building". Smith believed the definitions of "nation" and "nationalism" offered by both modernism and primordialism were limited. For him, the problem of modernism is mainly that modernists define nation as "modern nation" with characters of European nations of 18th and 19th centuries, making their definition Eurocentric and partial. Instead, Smith proposes an "ideal-typical" definition of the nation: "A named human population sharing an historic territory, common myths and historical memories, a mass, public culture, a common economy and common legal rights and duties for all members". Smith also introduces the important term ethnie, meaning "ethnic group", which is used to describe pre-modern ethnic communities. Ethnies contain six main attributes:

1. a collective proper name
2. a myth of common ancestry
3. shared historical memories
4. one or more differentiating elements of common culture
5. an association with a specific "homeland"
6. a sense of solidarity for significant sectors of the population

According to Smith, there are four main mechanisms of ethnic self-renewal:

1. religious reform, as exemplified in the history of Jews
2. cultural borrowing, exemplified with encounter between Jewish and Greek cultures
3. popular participation, exemplified with the socio-religious popular movement of the Mazdakites in 5th-century Sassanid Persia undermining the foundations of the Sassanid state
4. myths of ethnic election, the lack of which might be related to the diminishment of ethnic survival of Assyria, Phoenicia and the Philistines

In order to understand why and how a nation emerges, Smith posits two types of ethnic community: the lateral (aristocratic) and the vertical (demotic). Lateral communities are usually made up of aristocrats and elites. For example, the Normans were united by shared myths of descent and the achievements of their dukes, but this identity was limited to the upper classes. On the other hand, vertical communities are more inclusive and connect different social classes through shared culture and history. For instance, the Israelite community united various social groups with common religious and historical traditions. In later works, Smith added a third type: immigrant nations that consist of the fragments of other ethnies, such as the United States and Australia.

Smith generally held that nations were a modern phenomenon, but made an exception for Egypt and Judah/Judea, the only cases in antiquity he judged to have approximated true nations. He examined and rejected comparable status for the Greek, Neo-Assyrian, Phoenician, Sumerian, and Achaemenid polities. For Smith, the Jews of the late Second Temple period provide "a closer approximation to the ideal type of the nation ... perhaps anywhere else in the ancient world."

According to Smith there are three ways in which the past may influence the national present:

1. Through the recurrence of the nation-form. The concept of the nation, Smith tells us, refers to a type of cultural resource and of human association that is potentially available in all periods of human history.
2. Through established continuities. Continuity can be found in "collective proper names, language codes and ethnic landscapes, all of which may linger on, even after the community to which they were attached has all but vanished". These components may also provide the framework for the revival of the community in a new form. Smith refers to the Greeks as a good example of this revival through continuity of names, language and landscapes.
3. Through appropriation and reinterpretation - exemplified in the tendency of later generations to rediscover, authenticate, and appropriate aspects of what they consider to be ‘their’ ethnic past.

=== John Hutchinson ===
John Hutchinson was a PhD student of Smith's at the London School of Economics. Hutchinson's primary contribution to ethnosymbolism is the theory of cultural nationalism, developed in the Dynamics of Cultural Nationalism (1987).

Hutchinson separates nationalism into "political nationalism" and "cultural nationalism", which are different, even competing conceptions of the nation, and "have sharply diverging political strategies". Political nationalists are essentially cosmopolitan rationalists whose conception of nation "looks forward ultimately to a common humanity transcending cultural differences". Although the fact that the world has been divided into multiple political communities has forced them to work within existing borders, political nationalists' objectives are to "secure a representative state for their community so that it might participate as an equal in the developing cosmopolitan rationalist civilization".

In contrast, cultural nationalists believe humanity is "infused with a creative force which endows all things with an individuality" similar to nature. They regard the state as accidental, since for them a nation is essentially a distinctive civilisation, "the product of its unique history, culture and geographical profile". Nations are organic entities and living personalities. Hutchinson contests that cultural nationalism hardly draws attention from theories of modernism.

Not only has he challenged modernism in his earlier works, he has also engaged postmodernism in his more recent works, especially in Nations as Zones of Conflict (2005).

== Criticism ==
Thomas Hylland Eriksen says it is misleading to claim there is an unbroken continuity from pre-modern cultures to national ones.

Similarly, Walker Connor and John Breuilly criticize ethnosymbolists for conflating ethnic groups and nations. Breuilly argues it is impossible to know from the evidence what meaning ethnic sentiments had for the majority of the people in the pre-modern era, going on to note how, unlike modern nations, many pre-modern identities lack an institutional basis through which national identity achieves form.

Breuilly is also skeptical of anachronistic readings of cultural materials from the past, explaining how nationalist intellectuals and politicians seize upon myths and symbols in order to promote a particular national identity. Indeed, in many cases, he argues nationalists simply invent myths or ignore contrary evidence. Furthermore, in contrast to the ethnosymbolist emphasis on early symbols, myths, values and traditions, Breuilly states there are many nationalist movements that have succeeded without having a rich ethnohistory to feed upon.

Umut Özkirimli and Spyros Sofos criticize the unproblematic relationship between nations and ethnies posited by Smith, suggesting that ethnosymbolist thinking is marked by "retrospective ethnicization". That is, scholars "ethnicize" a complex, contradictory and ambiguous past, packaging together disparate cultural and social traditions, often unrelated to each other, using the notion of ethnie. They argue that nations are defined by nationalists who also retrospectively construct these ethnies - "collections/collations of cultural practices established over time or invented, and forged together often arbitrarily, according to the judgement or needs of nation-builders—politicians or romantic folklorists, musicologists, educationalists and so on—most often the product of retrospective legitimation of the very processes that have underpinned nationalist projects".

Craig Calhoun argues that tracing continuity in ethnic traditions does not explain which traditions last or which will become the basis for nations. He emphasizes how traditions are not simply inherited, but reproduced, adapted to new circumstances to keep them meaningful, which may change meanings considerably.
