= Cultural nationalism =

How nationalism manifests culturally

Cultural nationalism is a term used by scholars of nationalism to describe efforts among intellectuals to promote the formation of national communities through emphasis on a common culture. It is contrasted with "political" nationalism, which refers to specific movements for national self-determination through the establishment of a nation-state.

== Definition ==
John Hutchinson's 1987 work The Dynamics of Cultural Nationalism argued against earlier scholarship that tended to conflate nationalism and state-seeking movements. Hutchinson developed a typology distinguishing cultural from political nationalists, describing how the former act as moral innovators, emerging at times of crisis, to engender movements that offer new maps of identity based on historical myths that - in turn - may inspire programmes of socio-political regeneration from the latter. He emphasises the dynamic role of historians and artists, showing how they interact with religious reformists and a discontented modernising intelligentsia to form national identities.

In his later work, Hutchinson admits his earlier distinction may be too simplistic and recognises:

It is often hard in practice to separate cultural and political nationalisms. Cultural nationalists often engage in political, even insurrectionary activities, and nationalists whose goal is for political independence may justify their claims by arguments that their nation has an ancient distinctive culture that is threatened by foreign rule.

— John Hutchinson, Cultural Nationalism, p.75

What distinguishes these cultural "revivals" from earlier ones is their political dynamism, arising from the "coming together of neo-classical and pre-romantic European intellectual currents". These cultural nationalist movements aimed at cultural homogenisation and utilised the study of history as a resource for social innovation. Intellectuals aim to "present populations with new maps of identity and political prescriptions that claim to combine the virtues of historical tradition and modern progress at times of crisis".

== History ==
Anthony D. Smith describes how intellectuals played a primary role in generating cultural perceptions of nationalism:

Wherever one turns in Europe, their seminal position in generating and analysing the concepts, myths, symbols and ideology of nationalism is apparent. This applies to the first appearance of the core doctrine and to the antecedent concepts of national character, genius of the nation and national will.

Smith posits the challenges posed to traditional religion and society in the Age of Revolution propelled many intellectuals to "discover alternative principles and concepts, and a new mythology and symbolism, to legitimate and ground human thought and action". The simultaneous concept of 'historicism' was characterised by an emerging belief in the birth, growth, and decay of specific peoples and cultures, which became "increasingly attractive as a framework for inquiry into the past and present and [...] an explanatory principle in elucidating the meaning of events, past and present".

Johann Gottfried Herder and Johann Gottlieb Fichte are considered key figures who argued for such a cultural definition of nationhood. They emphasised the distinctness of national cultures based predominantly around language, stressing its character as "the epitome of people’s unique historical memories and traditions and the central source of the national spirit".

Miroslav Hroch argues cultural nationalism laid the foundation for the emergence political nationalism.

For Yael Tamir, the right to national self-determination represents the embodiment of the "unique cultural essence of cultural groups" and their right to develop cultural distinctiveness, irrespective of whether these groups seek an independent nation-state.

== Criticism ==
Some scholars, such as Craig Calhoun and Eric Hobsbawm, among others, criticize cultural definitions of nationhood for neglecting the role of the state in the formation of national identities and the role played by socio-political elites in constructing cultural identities. Similarly, Paul Brass argues national identities are not given but rather the product of the politics of socio-political elites.

Umut Ozkirimli rejects a sharp distinction between cultural and political nationalism, emphasising that nationalism is about both. He states it simultaneously involves "the ‘culturalization’ of politics and the ‘politicisation’ of culture".

== Examples ==
Moderate manifestations of Flemish or Hindu nationalisms might be "cultural nationalism", while these same movements also include forms of ethnic nationalism and national mysticism.

== See also ==
- Minzu (anthropology)
- Civic nationalism
- Ethnic nationalism
