= National revival =

National revival or national awakening is a period of ethnic self-consciousness that often precedes a political movement for national liberation but that can take place at a time when independence is politically unrealistic. In the history of Europe, national revivals are most commonly associated with the period of romantic nationalism that started in the 18th and 19th centuries.

The classic definition is by Miroslav Hroch, who wrote that national revivals take place within a "nondominant ethnic group" characterized by lack of "'its own' nobility or ruling classes," possessing no state and with a "literary tradition in its own language" that is "incomplete or interrupted." A national revival begins when a group of educated members of such an "ethnic community" conclude that their group is a "nation" that needs to be "awakened, revived, and made aware," and to achieve recognition from other nations. This educated group then initiates a "national movement" which entails, "purposeful activity aimed at achieving all the attributes of a fully formed nation."

In The Dynamics of Cultural Nationalism: The Gaelic Revival and the Creation of the Irish Nation State, (2003), John Hutchinson argues that a national revival can serve as a focus for nationalist activity in lieu of opportunities for political or military movement toward autonomy.

== Examples ==
=== Antiquity ===
- Maccabees

=== Middle Ages ===
- Shu'ubiyya

=== 17th century ===
- Hindavi Swarajya
- Kokugaku

=== 18th century ===
- American Revolution
- Haitian Revolution

=== 19th century ===
- Celtic Revival
- Independence of Brazil
- Rise of nationalism in the Ottoman Empire
- Spanish American wars of independence
- Zionism

=== 20th century ===
- Azerbaijani national identity
- Early Kurdish nationalism
- Goa liberation movement
- Indonesian National Awakening
- Scottish Renaissance
- Sri Lankan independence movement

=== 21st century ===
- Ethnofuturism
- Indigenous movements in the Americas
- Meryan ethnofuturism

== See also ==
- National awakening (disambiguation)
