= National awakening =

National awakening or National Awakening may refer to:

== Historical periods ==
Historical periods of ethnic or national revival are often referred to as "national awakenings":

- Albanian National Awakening (1870–1912)
- Armenian National Awakening (19th century–1918)
- Belarusian National Revival (1862–1918)
- Bulgarian National Awakening (18th century) and National awakening of Bulgaria (19th century)
- Czech National Revival (18th–19th centuries)
- Estonian National Awakening (1850s–1918)
- Fennoman Movement (1800s–1917)
- Goa Liberation Movement (1928–1961)
- Greek Enlightenment (18th century) and Greek National Awakening (18th century–1821)
- Hindavi Swarajya (1645)
- Illyrian Movement (19th century)
- Indian Independence Movement (1885–1947)
- Indonesian National Awakening (1908–1945)
- Latvian National Awakening (three different periods)
- Lithuanian National Revival (19th century)
- Maccabees (2nd century BCE)
- Serbian Revival (18th century–1878)
- Sri Lankan Independence Movement (1915–1948)
- Ukrainian Movement (18th century–1917)
- Zionism (19th–20th centuries)

== Political parties and other groups ==
- East Turkestan National Awakening Movement, a political movement supporting the independence of East Turkestan
- Khun Hynniewtrep National Awakening Movement, a movement in India
- National Awakening (Iceland), a political party in Iceland from 1994 to 2000
- National Awakening Party, a political party in Indonesia
- Southern Azerbaijan National Awakening Movement, a separatist movement in Iran
- Ulema National Awakening Party, a political party in Indonesia

== See also ==
- National revival
