= Walker Connor =

American political scientist (1926–2017)

- Born: June 19, 1926; South Hadley, Massachusetts, United States
- Died: February 28, 2017 (aged 90); Mount Holly, Vermont
- Education: B.A., University of Massachusetts Amherst M.A., Ph.D., Georgetown University
- Occupation: Political Scientist
- Employer: Middlebury College
- Title: Distinguished Visiting Professor

Walker F. Connor (June 19, 1926 – February 28, 2017) was Distinguished Visiting Professor of Political Science at Middlebury College (Middlebury, Vermont, USA). Connor is best known for his work on nationalism and is considered one of the founders of the interdisciplinary field of nationalism studies.

Before the collapse of European communism that began in the late 1980s, nationalism was not a subject of significant academic study and was generally neglected, with the exception of some major contributions by authors such as Ernest Gellner, Benedict Anderson, and Anthony D. Smith. Connor’s work was another exception to this rule, and today he is regarded as “one of the scholars of nationalism and ethnic conflict who has contributed most towards establishing a conceptual grounding” for the study of nationalism.

Widely cited for his insistence on the inherently ethnic character of nationalism, which he called ethnonationalism to emphasize the point, Connor long held that the most significant obstacle to advancing the study of nationalism is terminological imprecision. Particularly problematic, he contended, is the tendency to conflate the distinct concepts of state and nation, as well as the respective concepts of patriotism and nationalism which derive from them.

Connor viewed the nation as a "self-differentiating ethnic group" that believes its members are ancestrally related, forming a "fully extended family." He believed that nationalism belongs to the realm of the "subconscious" and the "nonrational" (which he distinguished from "irrational"), rooted in the deep psychological bond of common ancestry. He argued that national identity is not dependent on academic accuracy.

Connor is also well known for his critiques of Marxist-Leninist theories of nationalism in his book, The National Question in Marxist-Leninist Theory and Strategy, in which he argues that the Marxist view of nationalism as merely a byproduct of economic conditions ensured they failed to suppress nationalism as they did not understand that ethnic identity and by extension nationalism was separate from economic or class interests.

== Academic appointments and honours ==
Connor held resident appointments at, among others, Harvard, Dartmouth, Trinity (Hartford), Pomona, Rensselaer Polytechnic Institute, the London School of Economics, the Woodrow Wilson International Center for Scholars, Oxford, Cambridge, Bellagio, Warsaw, Singapore, and the Fulbright Visiting Research Chair in Ethnicity and Multicultural Citizenship at Queen's University at Kingston.

The University of Nevada named him Distinguished American Humanist of 1991-92, and the University of Vermont named him Distinguished American Political Scientist of 1997.

== Selected publications ==
=== Publications by Connor ===
- Connor, Walker (2004). "The Timelessness of Nations". Nations and Nationalism. 10 (1/2): 35–47. doi:10.1111/j.1354-5078.2004.00153.x.
- Connor, Walker (1994). Ethnonationalism: The Quest for Understanding. Princeton, New Jersey: Princeton University Press. ISBN 0-691-02563-0.
- Connor, Walker (1984). The National Question in Marxist-Leninist Theory and Strategy. Princeton, New Jersey: Princeton University Press. ISBN 0-691-07655-3.

=== Publications by other authors ===
- Conversi, Daniele, ed. (2004). Ethnonationalism in the Contemporary World: Walker Connor and the Study of Nationalism. London: Routledge. ISBN 0-415-33273-7. (Includes a bibliography of Connor's work from 1967-2001.)
