= Georgi Mamarchev =

Bulgarian soldier (1786–1846)

- Георги Мамарчев
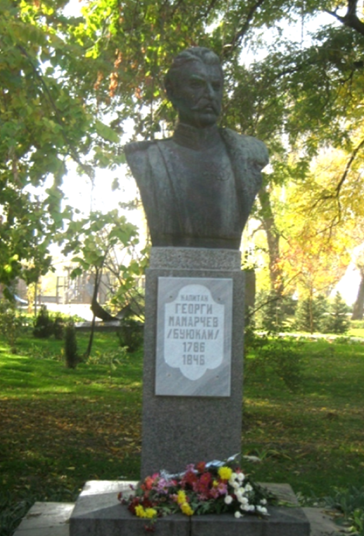
- Bust in Silistra
- Born: 1786; Kotel, Bulgaria
- Died: July 16, 1846 (aged 59–60); Samos
- Military career
- Allegiance: Russian Empire
- Branch: Russian Imperial Army
- Service years: 1810–1835
- Rank: Captain
- Commands: Bulgarian Countrymen's Army
- Conflicts: Russo-Turkish War (1806–1812); Battle of Borodino; Russo-Turkish War (1828–1829)

Georgi Mamarchev (Bulgarian: Георги Мамарчев; 1786 – 16 July 1846) was a Bulgarian fighter against the Ottoman rule and a captain in the Imperial Russian Army. Mamarchev was the uncle of the Bulgarian revolutionary Georgi Sava Rakovski.

Due to the merits of Mamarchev and out of respect for his work, Rakovski took the name of his uncle.

Mamarchev was the mastermind of the Bulgarian Conspiracy of 1835. He was not executed only because he was a Russian citizen, but he was exiled to the island of Samos, where he died.
