= Nation =

Community based on common ethnic, cultural or political identity

A nation is a type of social organization where a collective identity—a national identity—has emerged from a combination of shared features across a given population, such as language, history, ethnicity, culture, territory, and society. Some nations are constructed around ethnicity (see ethnic nationalism) while others are bound by political constitutions (see civic nationalism).

A nation is generally more overtly political than an ethnic group. Benedict Anderson defined a nation as "an imagined political community […] imagined because the members of even the smallest nation will never know most of their fellow-members, meet them, or even hear of them, yet in the minds of each lives the image of their communion", while Anthony D. Smith defined nations as cultural-political communities that have become conscious of their autonomy, unity and particular interests. Black's Law Dictionary also defines nation as a community of people inhabiting a defined territory and organized under an independent government. Thus, nation can be synonymous with state or country. Indeed, according to Thomas Hylland Eriksen, what distinguishes nations from other forms of collective identity, like ethnicity, is this very relationship with the state.

The consensus among scholars is that nations are socially constructed, historically contingent, organizationally flexible, and a distinctly modern phenomenon. Throughout history, people have had an attachment to their kin group and traditions, territorial authorities and their homeland, but nationalism – the belief that state and nation should align as a nation state – did not become a prominent ideology until the end of the 18th century.

== Etymology and terminology ==
The English word nation from Middle English c. 1300, nacioun "a race of people, large group of people with common ancestry and language", from Old French nacion "birth (naissance), rank; descendants, relatives; country, homeland" (12c.) and directly from Latin nationem (nominative natio (nātĭō), supine of verb nascar « to birth » (supine: natum) "birth, origin; breed, stock, kind, species; race of people, tribe", literally "that which has been born", from natus, past participle of nasci "be born" (Old Latin gnasci), from PIE root *gene- "give birth, beget", with derivatives referring to procreation and familial and tribal groups.

In Latin, natio represents the children of the same birth and also a human group of same origin. By Cicero, natio is used for "people". In imperial Roman epigraphy, natio with an ethnonym marks a register of belonging positioned between civic membership and a more localized origo.

== Nations in history ==
=== The existence of earlier nations ===
The broad consensus amongst scholars of nationalism is that nations are a recent phenomenon. However, some historians argue that their existence can be traced to the medieval period, or a minority believe even to antiquity.

Adrian Hastings argued that nations and nationalism are predominantly Christian phenomena, with Jews being the sole exception. He viewed them as the "true proto-nation" that provided the original model of nationhood through the foundational example of ancient Israel in the Hebrew Bible, despite losing their political sovereignty for nearly two millennia. Regarding the latter, Jews maintained their cohesive national identity through collective memory, religion and sacred texts, which ultimately culminated in the emergence of Zionism and the establishment of modern lsrael.

Anthony D. Smith argued that among the polities of antiquity, only Egypt and Judah/Judea, at certain periods, developed enough to approximate true nations. He also examined the Neo-Assyrian and Persian Empires, concluding that these produced only "self-defining ethnies," while in the Greek case no nation formed at all for want of a unifying political framework or ideology, a gap he held to be even wider for the Phoenicians or Sumerians. Smith cited two factors, emergence "within the matrix of a political system," which let political ideology forge ethnies into nations, and shared religion as "the cement of social solidarity." However, Egypt's temple religion, tied to the divine Pharaoh, later grew distant from ordinary people under foreign rule and was displaced by Christianity, while Judah's religion of "God, Torah and Temple," bound to the Covenant and its "myths of ethnic election and the Promised Land," was "continually renewed" and grew more inclusive, especially after the Maccabean Revolt and the rise of the Pharisees, giving it, via the three monotheisms, lasting influence on later nation-formation. For Smith, the Jews of the late Second Temple period provide "a closer approximation to the ideal type of the nation ... perhaps anywhere else in the ancient world."

Susan Reynolds has argued that many European medieval kingdoms were nations in the modern sense, except that political participation in nationalism was available only to a limited prosperous and literate class, while Hastings claims England's Anglo-Saxon kings mobilized mass nationalism in their struggle to repel Norse invasions. He argues that Alfred the Great, in particular, drew on biblical language in his law code and that during his reign selected books of the Bible were translated into Old English to inspire Englishmen to fight to turn back the Norse invaders. Hastings argues for a strong renewal of English nationalism (following a hiatus after the Norman Conquest) beginning with the translation of the complete bible into English by the Wycliffe circle in the 1380s, positing that the frequency and consistency in usage of the word nation from the early fourteenth century onward strongly suggest English nationalism and the English nation have been continuous since that time.

However, John Breuilly criticizes Hastings's assumption that continued usage of a term such as 'English' means continuity in its meaning. Patrick J. Geary agrees, arguing names were adapted to different circumstances by different powers and could convince people of continuity, even if radical discontinuity was the lived reality.

Florin Curta cites Medieval Bulgarian nation as another possible example. Danubian Bulgaria was founded in 680–681 as a continuation of Great Bulgaria. After the adoption of Orthodox Christianity in 864 it became one of the cultural centres of Slavic Europe. Its leading cultural position was consolidated with the invention of the Cyrillic script in its capital Preslav on the eve of the 10th century. Hugh Poulton argues the development of Old Church Slavonic literacy in the country had the effect of preventing the assimilation of the South Slavs into neighboring cultures and stimulated the development of a distinct ethnic identity. A symbiosis was carried out between the numerically weak Bulgars and the numerous Slavic tribes in that broad area from the Danube to the north, to the Aegean Sea to the south, and from the Adriatic Sea to the west, to the Black Sea to the east, who accepted the common ethnonym "Bulgarians". During the 10th century the Bulgarians established a form of national identity that was far from modern nationalism but helped them to survive as a distinct entity through the centuries.

Anthony Kaldellis asserts in Hellenism in Byzantium (2008) that what is called the Byzantine Empire was the Roman Empire transformed into a nation-state in the Middle Ages.

Azar Gat also argues China, Korea and Japan were nations by the time of the European Middle Ages.

The Bulletin de la Société de géographie (1855), Maury (1855), Marty (1916), and Gadzekpo (2002) argue that, the Serer ethnoreligous group found in present-day Senegal, Gambia, and Mauritania, are a nation, and one of the oldest inhabitants of the Senegambia region. The Serers of the north originated from the ancient kingdom of Takrur, now part of present-day Fouta Toro – which was part of Serer country, who, from the 11th century, faced religious and ethnic persecution from Islamic forces, resulting in the Serer Exodus from Takrur to the south. The influence of Serer religion, history, culture, and traditions, on the land has been so immense that, historian, Professor Charles Becker, in his paper "Vestiges historiques, trémoins matériels du passé clans les pays Sereer" (1993) writes:

Finally we should remember the important relic call Sereer in Fouta, but also in the former countries of the Ferlo, Jolof and Kajoor, which marked the migration of proto-Sereer, whose imprint on the Fouta was so significant and remains in the memory of the Halpulaareen [speakers of the Pulaar language in Senegal and the Gambia such as the Fula and Toucouleur people].

After a thousand years of religious and ethnic persecution, the Serer, "today scattered in several small states on the coast or pushed back into the woods of the interior, must be one of the oldest in Senegambia." They form the third largest ethnic group in Senegal, and form a minority in neighbouring Gambia, Mauritania, and to a lesser extent, Guinea-Bissau.

=== Criticisms ===
In contrast, Geary rejects the conflation of early medieval and contemporary group identities as a myth, arguing it is a mistake to conclude continuity based on the recurrence of names. He criticizes historians for failing to recognize the differences between earlier ways of perceiving group identities and more contemporary attitudes, stating they are "trapped in the very historical process we are attempting to study."

Similarly, Sami Zubaida notes that many states and empires in history ruled over ethnically diverse populations, and "shared ethnicity between ruler and ruled did not always constitute grounds for favour or mutual support". He goes on to argue ethnicity was never the primary basis of identification for the members of these multinational empires.

Paul Lawrence criticises Hastings's reading of Bede's Ecclesiastical History of the English People as evidence of an early English national identity, instead observing that those writing so-called 'national' histories may have "been working with a rather different notion of 'the nation' to those writing history in the modern period". Lawrence goes on to argue that such documents do not demonstrate how ordinary people identified themselves, pointing out that, while they serve as texts in which an elite defines itself, "their significance in relation to what the majority thought and felt was likely to have been minor."

=== Use of term nationes by medieval universities and other medieval institutions ===
A significant early use of the term nation, as natio, occurred at medieval universities to describe the colleagues in a college or students, above all at the University of Paris, who were all born within a pays, spoke the same language and expected to be ruled by their own familiar law. In 1383 and 1384, while studying theology at Paris, Jean Gerson was elected twice as a procurator for the French natio. The University of Prague adopted the division of students into nationes: from its opening in 1349 the studium generale which consisted of Bohemian, Bavarian, Saxon and Polish nations.

In a similar way, the nationes were segregated by the Knights Hospitaller of Jerusalem, who maintained at Rhodes the hostels from which they took their name "where foreigners eat and have their places of meeting, each nation apart from the others, and a Knight has charge of each one of these hostels, and provides for the necessities of the inmates according to their religion", as the Spanish traveller Pedro Tafur noted in 1436.

== Early modern nations ==
In his article, "The Mosaic Moment: An Early Modernist Critique of the Modernist Theory of Nationalism", Philip S. Gorski argues that the first modern nation-state was the Dutch Republic, created by a fully modern political nationalism rooted in the model of biblical nationalism. In a 2013 article "Biblical nationalism and the sixteenth-century states", Diana Muir Appelbaum expands Gorski's argument to apply to a series of new, Protestant, sixteenth-century nation states. A similar, albeit broader, argument was made by Anthony D. Smith in his books, Chosen Peoples: Sacred Sources of National Identity and Myths and Memories of the Nation.

In her book Nationalism: Five Roads to Modernity, Liah Greenfeld argued that nationalism was invented in England by 1600. According to Greenfeld, England was "the first nation in the world."

For Smith, creating a 'world of nations' has had profound consequences for the global state system, as a nation comprises both a cultural and political identity. Therefore, he argues, "any attempt to forge a national identity is also a political action with political consequences, like the need to redraw the geopolitical map or alter the composition of political regimes and states."

== Social science ==
There are three notable perspectives on how nations developed. Primordialism (perennialism), which reflects popular conceptions of nationalism but has largely fallen out of favour among academics, proposes that there have always been nations and that nationalism is a natural phenomenon. Ethnosymbolism explains nationalism as a dynamic, evolving phenomenon and stresses the importance of symbols, myths and traditions in the development of nations and nationalism. Modernization theory, which has superseded primordialism as the dominant explanation of nationalism, adopts a constructivist approach and proposes that nationalism emerged due to processes of modernization, such as industrialization, urbanization, and mass education, which made national consciousness possible.

Proponents of modernization theory describe nations as "imagined communities", a term coined by Benedict Anderson. A nation is an imagined community in the sense that the material conditions exist for imagining extended and shared connections and that it is objectively impersonal, even if each individual in the nation experiences themselves as subjectively part of an embodied unity with others. For the most part, members of a nation remain strangers to each other and will likely never meet. Nationalism is consequently seen as an "invented tradition" in which shared sentiment provides a form of collective identity and binds individuals together in political solidarity. A nation's foundational "story" may be built around a combination of ethnic attributes, values and principles, and may be closely connected to narratives of belonging.

Scholars in the 19th and early 20th century offered constructivist criticisms of primordial theories about nations. A prominent lecture by Ernest Renan, "What is a Nation?", argues that a nation is "a daily referendum", and that nations are based as much on what the people jointly forget as on what they remember. Carl Darling Buck argued in a 1916 study, "Nationality is essentially subjective, an active sentiment of unity, within a fairly extensive group, a sentiment based upon real but diverse factors, political, geographical, physical, and social, any or all of which may be present in this or that case, but no one of which must be present in all cases."

In the late 20th century, many social scientists argued that there were two types of nations, the civic nation of which French republican society was the principal example and the ethnic nation exemplified by the German peoples. The German tradition was conceptualized as originating with early 19th-century philosophers, like Johann Gottlieb Fichte, and referred to people sharing a common language, religion, culture, history, and ethnic origins, that differentiate them from people of other nations. On the other hand, the civic nation was traced to the French Revolution and ideas deriving from 18th-century French philosophers. It was understood as being centred in a willingness to "live together", this producing a nation that results from an act of affirmation. This is the vision, among others, of Ernest Renan.

== Debate about a potential future of nations ==
There is an ongoing debate about the future of nations − about whether this framework will persist as is and whether there are viable or developing alternatives.

The theory of the clash of civilizations lies in direct contrast to cosmopolitan theories about an ever more-connected world that no longer requires nation states. According to political scientist Samuel P. Huntington, people's cultural and religious identities will be the primary source of conflict in the post–Cold War world. The theory was originally formulated in a 1992 lecture at the American Enterprise Institute, which was then developed in a 1993 Foreign Affairs article titled "The Clash of Civilizations?", in response to Francis Fukuyama's 1992 book, The End of History and the Last Man. Huntington later expanded his thesis in a 1996 book The Clash of Civilizations and the Remaking of World Order.

Huntington began his thinking by surveying the diverse theories about the nature of global politics in the post–Cold War period. Some theorists and writers argued that human rights, liberal democracy and capitalist free market economics had become the only remaining ideological alternative for nations in the post–Cold War world. Specifically, Francis Fukuyama, in The End of History and the Last Man, argued that the world had reached a Hegelian "end of history".

Huntington believed that while the age of ideology had ended, the world had reverted only to a normal state of affairs characterized by cultural conflict. In his thesis, he argued that the primary axis of conflict in the future will be along cultural and religious lines. Postnationalism is the process or trend by which nation states and national identities lose their importance relative to supranational and global entities. Several factors contribute to the trend Huntington identifies, including economic globalization, a rise in importance of multinational corporations, the internationalization of financial markets, the transfer of socio-political power from national authorities to supranational entities, such as multinational corporations, the United Nations and the European Union and the advent of new information and culture technologies such as the Internet. However attachment to citizenship and national identities often remains important.

Jan Zielonka of the University of Oxford states that "the future structure and exercise of political power will resemble the medieval model more than the Westphalian one" with the latter being about "concentration of power, sovereignty and clear-cut identity" and neo-medievalism meaning "overlapping authorities, divided sovereignty, multiple identities and governing institutions, and fuzzy borders."

== See also ==
- Citizenship – Legal membership in a country
- City network – Geographical concept
- Country – Distinct territorial body or political entity
- Government – System or group governing an organized community
- Identity (social science) – Qualities, beliefs, personality, looks and/or expressions that distinguish a person
- Imagined Communities – 1983 book by Benedict Anderson
- Invented tradition – Recently invented cultural practices perceived as old
- Irredentism – Territorial claim
- Lists of people by nationality
- Meta-ethnicity – Large group of related ethnic groups who identify with each other
- Minzu (anthropology) – Chinese concept of community and culture
- Multinational state – State comprising multiple nations
- National emblem – Seal reserved for use by a nation state or multi-national state
- National god – Guardian deity of an ethnic group or political unit
- National memory – Form of collective memory defined by shared experiences and culture
- Nationalism – Ideology promoting the nation-state
- Nationality – Status of being a member or citizen of a particular nation
- People – Plurality of persons considered as a whole
- Polity – Group of people with a collective identity
- Race (human categorization) – Grouping by physical or social qualities
- Republic – Form of government
- Republicanism – Political ideology centered on citizenship in a state organized as a republic
- Separatism – Advocacy for separation from a larger group
- Society – Connected group of individuals
- Sovereign state – State having the highest authority over a territory
- Stateless nation – Ethnic group or nation that does not possess its own state
- Tribe – Human social group

== Sources ==
- Anderson, Benedict (1983). Imagined Communities. London: Verso Books.
- Gellner, Ernest (1983). Nations and Nationalism. Cambridge: Blackwell.
- James, Paul (1996). Nation Formation: Towards a Theory of Abstract Community. Vol. 1. London: SAGE Publications.
- James, Paul (2006). Globalism, Nationalism, Tribalism: Bringing Theory Back In – Volume 2 of Towards a Theory of Abstract Community. London: Sage Publications.
- Smith, Anthony (1986). The Ethnic Origins of Nations. London: Blackwell.
- Bhabha, Homi K. (1990). Nations and Narration. New York: Routledge.
- Eller, Jack David (1997). "Ethnicity, Culture, and "The Past"". Michigan Quarterly Review. 36 (4). hdl:2027/spo.act2080.0036.411.
- Mylonas, Harris; Tudor, Maya (11 May 2021). "Nationalism: What We Know and What We Still Need to Know". Annual Review of Political Science. 24 (1): 109–132.
- Bulletin de la Société de géographie, Volume 26. Société de Géographie (1855), pp. 3536. (retrieved 18 Feb 2026).
- Maury, Alfred, "Rapports à la Soc. de géographie, Volume 1." (1855). p. 25 (retrieved 18 Feb 2026).
- Marty, Paul, L'Islám en Mauritanie et au Sénégal. E. Leroux (1916), p. 49.
- Gadzekpo, Seth Kordzo. "History of African Civilisations." Rabbi Books (2002), p. 137. ISBN 9789988778736.
- Chavane, Bruno A., "Villages de l’ancien Tekrour", Vol. 2, Hommes et sociétés. Archéologies africaines, p. 10, 38, KARTHALA Editions (1985), ISBN 2-86537-143-3.
- Becker, Charles, "Vestiges historiques, trémoins matériels du passé clans les pays sereer". Dakar. 1993. CNRS – ORS TO M.
