= Nationalism studies =

Interdisciplinary academic field

The Tower of Babel, a common symbol in discussions of nationalism (painting by Pieter Bruegel the Elder, 1563)

Nationalism studies is an interdisciplinary academic field devoted to the study of nationalism and related issues. While nationalism has been the subject of scholarly discussion since at least the late eighteenth century, it is only since the early 1990s that it has received enough attention for a distinct field to emerge.

Authors such as Eric Hobsbawm, Carlton J. H. Hayes, Hans Kohn, Elie Kedourie, John Hutchinson, Ernest Gellner, Karl Deutsch, Walker Connor, Anthony D. Smith, and Benedict Anderson laid the foundation for nationalism studies in the post-war period. In the early 1990s their ideas were enthusiastically taken up by academics, journalists, and others looking to understand and explain the apparent resurgence of nationalism marked by events such as the collapse of the Soviet Union, the Rwanda genocide, and the Yugoslav Wars.

== History of the field ==
The development of the field can be divided into four stages: (I) the late eighteenth and nineteenth centuries, when nationalism first emerged, and most interest in it was philosophical; (II) the period from the First World War until the end of the Second, when nationalism became a subject of formal academic inquiry; (III) the post-war period from 1945 to the late 1980s, when several sociologists and political scientists developed general theories of nationalism in the context of worldwide decolonization and the 'ethnic revival' in the West; and (IV) the period following the fall of communism in 1989, which led to a surge of interest in nationalism and the crystallization of nationalism studies as a field.

=== Eighteenth and nineteenth centuries ===
"Up to the First World War," Umut Özkirimli explains, "interest in nationalism was largely ethical and philosophical. The scholars of this period, predominantly historians and social philosophers, were more concerned with the 'merits and defects' of the doctrine than with the origins and spread of national phenomena." The nation-state was seen as a progressive stage in the historical development of human societies, and both liberals and Marxists expected that nationalism would eventually give way to a cosmopolitan world order. In this context, nations and nationalism were taken for granted, and most authors who discussed them were motivated by some political concern. There were no attempts to fashion a general theory of nationalism that was applicable to all cases. Some of the important authors in this period include: Johann Gottfried Herder, Jean-Jacques Rousseau, Emmanuel Joseph Sieyès, Johann Gottlieb Fichte, Giuseppe Mazzini, Ernest Renan, and John Stuart Mill.

== Nationalism studies programs ==
Several universities organize degree and non-degree courses on nationalism. Boston University, University of London (particularly the London School of Economics), Central European University (Austria), University of Sussex, and University of Edinburgh are among the most prominent institutions where the study of nationalism occupies a central place. The Faculty of Humanities of Eötvös Loránd University (Hungary) has recently launched a comprehensive short-term program, dedicated exclusively to the study of nationalism.

The Complutense University of Madrid offers a masters degree on the topic of nationalism and national identities.

== The future of the field ==
Authors such as Michal Luczewski and Ruhtan Yalçıne believe that the field is becoming increasingly difficult to study. According to Michal Luczewski, researchers have been talking past each other for decades and there has not been valuable knowledge produced for around 50 years. Since this time, the field has been stuck between contemporary scientific facts and common-sense theories. Answers to the basic questions of nationalism (What is the Nation? Why does the Nation exist?) have been answered countless times over leaving a swath of contradictory theories and a lack of consensus. The question remains whether it is even possible to construct a universal theory of nationalism. Theories previously proposed are often detached from reality, given the diverse ways in which identities form in different groups around the world.

In order to solve for this problem Michal Luczewski recommends that scholars employ greater awareness in addressing the essential questions of nationalism studies. Scholars should produce extensive work dealing "with national phenomena in all their varieties, integrating emotions, cognitions, both the subjective and objective dimensions into one picture." It is essential for scholars to ignore subjective experience and deal directly with reality. This can be accomplished by utilizing empirical evidence. Luczewski also recommends starting small, "consecutively from the micro level through more and more general steps to the macro one."

== Journals ==
One of the earliest journals devoted to the study of nationalism was the Canadian Review of Studies in Nationalism, founded at the University of Prince Edward Island by Thomas Spira in 1973. The journal Nationalities Papers was founded in 1971. Journals in the field include the following:

- Ethnicities
- Ethnopolitics
- Ethnic and Racial Studies
- Immigrants & Minorities
- Journal of Ethnic and Migration Studies
- Journal on Ethnopolitics and Minority Issues in Europe
- Nationalism and Ethnic Politics
- National Identities
- Nations and Nationalism
- Nationalities Papers
- Studies in Ethnicity and Nationalism

== Associations ==
- Association for Research on Ethnicity and Nationalism in the Americas (ARENA)
- Association for the Study of Ethnicity and Nationalism (ASEN)
- Association for the Study of Nationalities (ASN)

== Research groups, centres, institutes, and chairs ==
- Canada Research Chair in Nationalism and Democracy, Queen's University
- Centre for Research in Ethnic Relations, University of Warwick
- Centre for Research on Ethnic Relations and Nationalism, University of Helsinki
- Centre for Research on Nationalism, Ethnicity and Multiculturalism, University of Surrey
- Centre for the Study of Ethnicity and Citizenship, University of Bristol
- Centre for the Study of Ethnicity and Culture, University of Birmingham
- Ethnicity and Democratic Governance, Queen's University
- Ethnicity, Nationalism and Migration Section, International Studies Association
- Fulbright Chair in Ethnicity and Multicultural Citizenship, Queen's University
- Globalism and Nationalism, RMIT University

== Academic programs ==
- The Boston School of Nationalism Studies, Boston University
- Nationalism and Ethnic Conflict, Birkbeck, University of London
- Nationalism Studies Program, Central European University
- Nationalism Studies, University of Edinburgh
- Nationalism Studies short-term program, Eötvös Loránd University
- Nationalism and Ethnicity, London School of Economics

== See also ==
- Ethnicity
- Gastronationalism
- National identity
- Sovereign state
- State (polity)
