= Association for the Study of Ethnicity and Nationalism =

Academic research association

- Abbreviation: ASEN
- Formation: 1990
- Type: Academic association
- Location: London, UK
- President: Jonathan Hearn
- Affiliations: London School of Economics
- Website: asen.ac.uk

The Association for the Study of Ethnicity and Nationalism (ASEN) is an international, interdisciplinary association for academics, researchers, students, journalists and others directly concerned with advancing the study of ethnicity and nationalism. It was founded by research students and academics in 1990 at the London School of Economics, where the headquarters of the Association are based. The objectives of the Association are to establish an international and interdisciplinary network of scholars interested in ethnicity and nationalism; stimulate debate on ethnicity and nationalism through the organisation of seminars, workshops, lectures and conferences; disseminate information on scholarly activities concerning ethnicity and nationalism; and publish research on ethnicity and nationalism in its journals Nations and Nationalism and Studies in Ethnicity and Nationalism.

== Administration ==
Anthony D. Smith was the President of the Association from its founding until 2013, when he was replaced by John Breuilly. In 2019 Jonathan Hearn became president. The current Vice Presidents are Daphne Halikiopoulou, Elliott Green, Eric Kaufmann, and John Hutchinson. The Association also has an Advisory Council, which is composed of more than twenty experts on ethnicity and nationalism from around the world.

== Publications ==
The Association publishes two journals: Nations and Nationalism, one of the most cited in the field, and Studies in Ethnicity and Nationalism (formerly The ASEN Bulletin), which publishes research from young scholars, junior faculty, post-doctoral researchers and graduate students.

The first issue of Nations and Nationalism was published in March 1995. In their editorial for that issue, Anthony D. Smith, Obi Igwara, Athena Leoussi, and Terry Mulhall described the need for a journal devoted to the study of nations and nationalism, and identified the three basic aims of the journal as: "(1) to be the vehicle of new research, both theoretical and empirical, and act as a forum for the exchange of views in the field; (2) to identify and develop a separate subject-area as a field of study in its own right, and unify the body of scholars in the field; [and] (3) to bring to the attention of the wider scholarly community, and the public, the need to treat the subject-area as a well-defined field of interdisciplinary study, which requires the collaboration of scholars from a variety of intellectual backgrounds."

Nations and Nationalism has been selected to be indexed in the Current Contents: Social & Behavioral Sciences Index and the Social Sciences Citation Index, but the impact factor has not yet been announced.

== Other activities ==
=== Conferences ===
Each spring, the Association organises one of the largest annual conferences in the interdisciplinary field of nationalism studies, hosted at the London School of Economics. Its 2008 conference, titled Nationalism, East and West: Civic and Ethnic Conceptions of Nationhood, was held in April and was the largest to date. The title of this year's conference is Nationalism and Globalisation. Past conference titles include: The Dark Face of Nationalism: Violence, Extremism and the Nation (2007); Nations and their Pasts: Representing the Past, Building the Future (2006); and Nation and Empire (2005).

=== Lectures, seminars and debates ===
The Association organises and hosts a range of different events at the London School of Economics including lectures, seminars and debates that feature prominent scholars. The Ernest Gellner Nationalism Lecture and the Nations and Nationalism Debate are annual, and a number of smaller seminars are held more frequently throughout the year.

=== Essay prize ===
The Dominique Jacquin-Berdal ASEN Prize, established to honour the memory of a late ASEN member and editor of Nations and Nationalism, is awarded annually to the author of a submitted paper "to encourage young scholars to publish original research in ethnicity and nationalism." The prize includes £250 and 2 years' free membership in the ASEN, and may lead to publication of the article in Nations and Nationalism.

=== Mailing list ===
The Association also maintains a mailing list, called Nationalism Research, which "provides members information on conferences, including calls for papers; new publications in the field; scholarships for students and researchers; jobs in academia; and events organised by the Association for the Study of Ethnicity and Nationalism at the London School of Economics and Political Science."

== Similar organisations ==
- Association for the Study of Nationalities (ASN)
- Association for Research on Ethnicity and Nationalism in the Americas (ARENA)
