= Pippa Catterall =

British academic historian

Pippa Poppy Catterall (born Peter Paul Catterall in 1961) is a British academic historian who, since 2016, has been Professor of History and Policy at the University of Westminster. Her research has focused on twentieth-century history and politics, the mass media, conflict studies and nationalism.

== Career ==
Catterall was educated at Eltham College and Robinson College, Cambridge, graduating from Cambridge University with a history Bachelor of Arts (BA) degree in 1984. She then completed a doctorate (PhD) at Queen Mary University of London in 1989, having successfully defended her thesis on religion and politics in inter-war Britain. She was a research fellow at the Institute of Contemporary British History (1989–90) and Director of the Institute until 1999. From 1999 to 2000 she was a Fulbright Scholar at the Westminster Churchill Institute. In 2000, she returned to Queen Mary to teach history and politics until 2012, when she was appointed Reader in History at the University of Westminster; four years later, in 2016, she was promoted to Professor of History and Policy.

She was a Conservative councillor in the London Borough of Bexley until 2014, where she served as Cabinet Member for Leisure.

== Research ==
Catterall specialises in the history of the twentieth century. She was founding editor of the journal National Identities. She has worked in conflict studies and nationalism, and on twentieth-century history, including the history of mass media, and as editor of the diaries of Harold Macmillan. In Northcliffe's Legacy, she explores the role of news media in the "persistence" of popular misunderstandings of Einstein's Theory of relativity.

=== Publications ===
- "The State of Literature on Post-War Britain", in Gorst, A., Johnman, L., and Lucas, W. S. (ed.), Post-War Britain 1945–64: Themes and Perspectives (London: Frances Pinter Publishers, 1989), pp. 221–241.
- British History, 1945–1987: An Annotated Bibliography (Oxford: Oxford University Press: 1991).
- "Church decline, secularism and ecumenism", Contemporary Record, 5:2 (1991), pp. 276–290.
- History of Electrex, 1950–1993 (1993).
- "The east of Suez decision", Contemporary Record, 7:3 (1993), pp. 612–653.
- "Symposium: Editing Political Diaries", Contemporary Record, 7:1 (1993), pp. 103–131.
- "Morality and politics: the free churches and the Labour Party between the wars", Historical Journal, 36:3 (1993), pp. 667–685.
- (editor; with J. Obelkevich) Understanding Post-War British Society (London: Routledge, 1994).
- "The party and religion", in Seldon, A., and Ball, S. (ed.), Conservative century: the Conservative Party since 1900 (Oxford: Oxford University Press, 1994), pp. 637–670.
- "The battle of Cable Street", Contemporary Record, 8:1 (1994), pp. 105–132.
- (with E. M. Tansey), "Technology transfer in Britain: the case of monoclonal antibodies", Contemporary Record, 9:2 (1995), pp. 409–444.
- (editor; with S. McDougall) The Northern Ireland Question in British Politics (Basingstoke: MacMillan, 1996).
- "Reassessing the impact of yesterday's men", Contemporary British History, 10:4 (1996), pp. 108–138.
- (editor; with E. Tansey, D. Christie, S. Willhoft and L. Reynolds) Wellcome Witnesses to Twentieth-Century Medicine, vol. 1 (London: Wellcome Trust, 1997).
- "Engineering and Economic Performance in Britain since 1945", in Clesse, A., and Coker, C. (ed.), The Vitality of Britain (Luxembourg: Luxembourg Institute for European and International Studies, 1997), pp. 78–101.
- (with C. Brady) "Managing the core executive", Public Administration, 75:3 (1997), pp. 509–529.
- "Handling the transfer of power: a note on the 1964 origins of the Douglas‐Home rules", Contemporary British History, 11:1 (1997), pp. 76–82.
- "What (if anything) is distinctive about contemporary history?", Journal of Contemporary History, 32:4 (1997), pp. 441–452.
- "'Imagine if Labour won the Election': the Conservative Party's political broadcasts", Historical Journal of Film, Radio and Television, 17:4 (1997), pp. 453–457.
- "Departmental Select Committees", Contemporary British History, 11:3 (1997), pp. 77–98.
- "Cabinet committees in British governance", Public Policy and Administration, 13:4 (1998), pp. 67–84.
- (editor) The Making of Channel 4 (London: Cass, 1999).
- "Management and engineering education in the 1950s and 1960s", Contemporary British History, 13:3 (1999), pp. 10–22.
- (editor; with W. Kaiser and U. Walton-Jordan) Reforming the Constitution: Debates in Twentieth-Century Britain (London: Cass, 2000).
- (editor; with C. Seymour-Ure and A. Smith) Northcliffe's Legacy: Aspects of the British Popular Press, 1896–1996 (Basingstoke: Macmillan, 2000).
- "Foreign and Commonwealth policy in opposition: the Labour Party", in Kaiser, W., and Staerck, G. (ed.), British Foreign Policy 1955–64: Contracting Options (Basingstoke: Macmillan, 2000), pp. 89–109.
- (with C. Brady) "The Development and Role of Cabinet Committees in Britain", in Rhodes, R. A. W. (ed.), Transforming British Government, vol. 1 (Basingstoke: Palgrave Macmillan, 2000), pp. 156–175.
- "The British electoral system 1885–1970", Historical Research, 73:181 (2000), pp. 156–174.
- "The British Isles today", in Hall, S., and Haywood, J. (ed.), The Penguin atlas of British and Irish History (London: Penguin, 2000), pp. 276–279.
- "Harold Macmillan and Europe 1950–56: the Cold War, the American context and the British approach to European integration", Cercles, 5 (2002), pp. 93–108.
- (editor) The Macmillan Diaries: the Cabinet Years, 1950–57 (London: Macmillan, 2003).
- "Conclusions: The ironies of 'successful failure'", in Daddow, O. J. (ed.), Harold Wilson and European integration: Britain's second application to join the EEC (London: Cass, 2003), pp. 243–252.
- "Roles and relationships: Dean Acheson, 'British decline' and post-war Anglo-American relations", in Capet, A., and Sy-Wonyu, A. (ed.), The Special Relationship: la 'Relation Spéciale' Entre le Royaumi-Uni et Les États Unis (Rouen: Universite de Rouen, 2003), pp. 109–126.
- "The Prime Minister and his Trollope: reading Harold Macmillan’s reading", Cercles Occasional Papers Series, 1 (2004), pp. 1–20.
- "Twenty-five years of promoting free markets: a history of Economic Affairs", Economic Affairs, 25:4 (2005), pp. 48–57.
- "Identity and integration: Macmillan, “Britishness” and the turn towards Europe", in Millat, G. (ed.), Angleterre ou Albion, Entre Fascination et Répulsion (Lille: Université Lille 3 Charles de Gaulle, 2006), pp. 161–178.
- "The singularity of Suez in Anglo-French relations 1951–64: une entente mal entendue", in Capet, A. (ed.), Britain, France and the Entente Cordiale since 1904 (Basingstoke: Palgrave Macmillan, 2006), pp. 124–142.
- "The distinctiveness of British socialism? Religion and the Labour Party c. 1900–1939", in Worley, M. (ed.), The Foundations of the Labour Party (Ashgate, 2009), pp. 131–152.
- (editor; with H. MacMillan) The Macmillan Diaries: Vol. II, Prime Minister and After, 1957–66 (2011).
- "Democracy, cosmopolitanism and national identity in a 'globalising' world", National Identities, 13:4 (2011), pp. 329–347.
- "At the end of the day: Macmillan's account of the Cuban missile crisis", International Relations, 26:3 (2012), pp. 267–289.
- "Slums and salvation", in Husselbee, L., and Ballard, P. (ed.), Free Churches and Society since 1800 (Continuum, 2012), pp. 111–132.
- (editor) The Making of Channel 4 (London: Routledge, 2013).
- "Nonconformity and the labour movement", in Pope, R. (ed.), T. & T. Clark Companion to Nonconformity London (Bloomsbury T&T Clark, 2013), pp. 459–472.
- "Modifying 'a very dangerous message': Britain, the non-aligned and the UN during the Cuban missile crisis", in Gioe, D., Scott, L., and Andrew, C. (ed.), An International History of the Cuban Missile Crisis: a 50-year Retrospective (London: Routledge, 2014), pp. 72–98.
- "Prime Minister and President: Harold Macmillan’s accounts of the Cuban missile crisis", in Scott, L., and Hughes, R. G. (ed.) The Cuban Missile Crisis: a Critical Appraisal (London: Routledge, 2015), pp. 75–101.
- (editor; with C. J. Morris), Britain and the Threat to Stability in Europe, 1918–45 (London: Bloomsbury Academic, 2016).
- Labour and the Free Churches, 1918–1939: Radicalism, Righteousness and Religion (London: Bloomsbury: 2016).
