= Bulgarian National Awakening =

Aspect of Bulgarian history

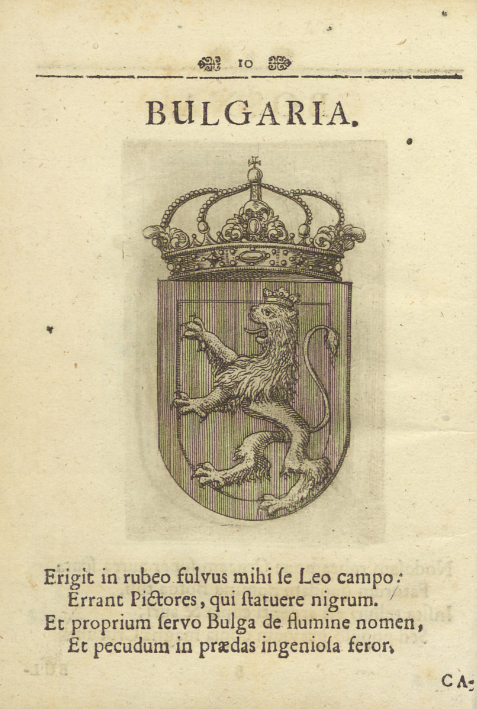
The coat of arms of Bulgaria from 1701 heraldic work Stemmatografia.

The Bulgarian National Awakening (Bulgarian: Ранно възраждане) is the initial period of the Bulgarian National Revival in the history of Bulgaria, from the Treaty of Karlowitz to the Ottoman coups of 1807–08. During this Age of Enlightenment and especially after the French Revolution, the interest in self-identification and self-knowledge was aroused and revived in the conditions of the gradual decline of the Ottoman Empire, especially after the Treaty of Küçük Kaynarca.

== Background ==
Ottoman Bulgaria, administratively formed as Rumelia Eyalet, is the foundation on which the Ottoman Empire stepped for its establishment, consolidation and conquest in Europe until the two battles of Vienna (Siege of Vienna and Battle of Vienna). Previously, the two battles at Mohács marked the beginning and end of the Ottoman presence in Central Europe.

The period of the 16th and 17th centuries until the Great Turkish War were a time of all-round prosperity without wars in the Bulgarian lands. The Franco-Ottoman alliance ensured the status quo in Europe and determined the new age and classicism, including Ancien Régime politically.

Another source of the Bulgarian national revival was the Romantic nationalist vision of a people sharing oral traditions and practices. These ideas were stimulated by the work of Johann Gottfried Herder in particular, and were reinforced by Russian Slavophiles and the model Serbian nationalism under the stimulus of scholar-publicists such as Vuk Karadžić. In Bulgaria, the scholar and newspaper editor Lyuben Karavelov played an important role in collecting and publishing oral traditions, and comparing them with the traditions of other Slavic peoples.

== Beginning of the awakening ==
The loss of Ottoman Hungary was a crushing blow to the Ottoman Empire. The Treaty of Constantinople (1700) established diplomatic relations of the Ottoman Empire with the Tsardom of Russia, which after the period of Government reform of Peter the Great rose to the Russian Empire (1721). The Kingdom of Prussia appeared on the political map of Europe, with which the Ottoman Empire established diplomatic relations in 1761 during the Seven Years' War.

After the end of the Köprülü era, the Bulgarian lands and the Bulgarians found themselves after two centuries of tranquility of Pax Ottomana again on Via Militaris, as during the first three crusades during the time of Byzantine Bulgaria. This circumstance in the context of Age of Enlightenment marks the beginning of the awakening of the Bulgarians. In Ottoman historiography, this time is called the Tulip period. French diplomacy in the person of Louis Sauveur Villeneuve managed with the Treaty of Belgrade and Treaty of Niš (1739) to stabilize its key ally since the time of Suleiman the Magnificent, but the glory of the sword of Osman has passed with the seventeenth century.

It was at this time that two key works appeared, marking the overall socio-economic and cultural-spiritual changes in the Bulgarian lands and in the life and spirit of the Bulgarians — Stemmatografia by Hristofor Žefarović and Istoriya Slavyanobolgarskaya. The beginning of the revival was marked by the enlightenment of Maxim Suvorov, and the beginning of the end of the revival was marked by the coup as a result of which Catherine the Great became Empress and which coup was followed on Ottoman territory by the liquidation of the centuries-old spiritual institutes of the Patriarchate of Peć and Archbishopric of Ohrid.

The Bulgarian national revival is considered to have started with the work of Saint Paisius of Hilendar, who opposed Greek domination of Bulgaria's culture and religion. His work Istoriya Slavyanobolgarskaya ("History of the Slav-Bulgarians"), which appeared in 1762, was the first work of Bulgarian historiography. It is considered Paisius' greatest work and one of the greatest pieces of Bulgarian literature. In it, Paisius interpreted Bulgarian medieval history with the goal of reviving the spirit of his nation.

== Bulgarian Exarchate ==
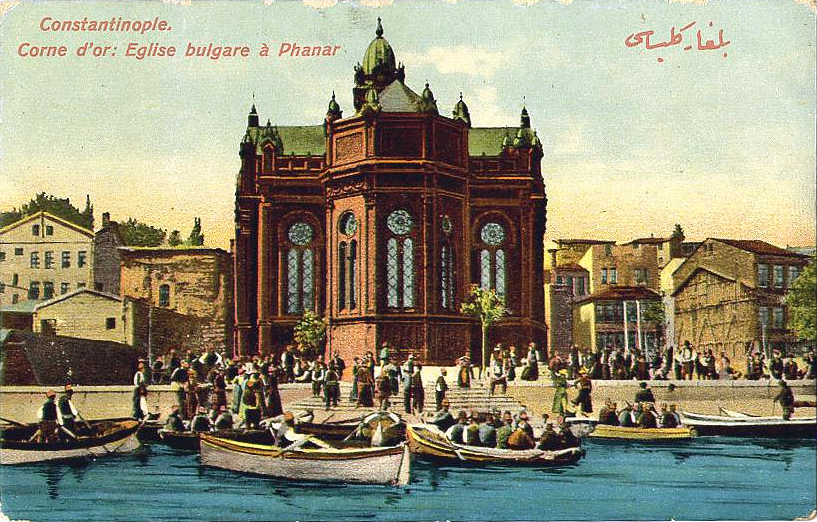
An early-20th-century postcard depicting the Bulgarian St. Stephen Church in Balat, Constantinople.

The Bulgarian Exarchate (a de facto autocephaly) was unilaterally (without the blessing of the Ecumenical Patriarch) promulgated on May 23 [O.S. May 11] 1872, in the Bulgarian church in Constantinople in pursuance of the March 12 [O.S. February 28] 1870 firman of Sultan Abdülaziz of the Ottoman Empire.

The foundation of the Exarchate was the direct result of the struggle of the Bulgarian Orthodox against the domination of the Greek Patriarchate of Constantinople in the 1850s and 1860s. In 1872, the Patriarchate accused the Exarchate that it introduced ethno-national characteristics in the religious organization of the Orthodox Church, and the secession from the Patriarchate was officially condemned by the Council in Constantinople in September 1872 as schismatic. Nevertheless, Bulgarian religious leaders continued to extend the borders of the Exarchate in the Ottoman Empire by conducting plebiscites in areas contested by both Churches.

In this way, in the struggle for recognition of a separate Church, the modern Bulgarian nation was created under the name Bulgar Millet.

== Key events and personalities ==
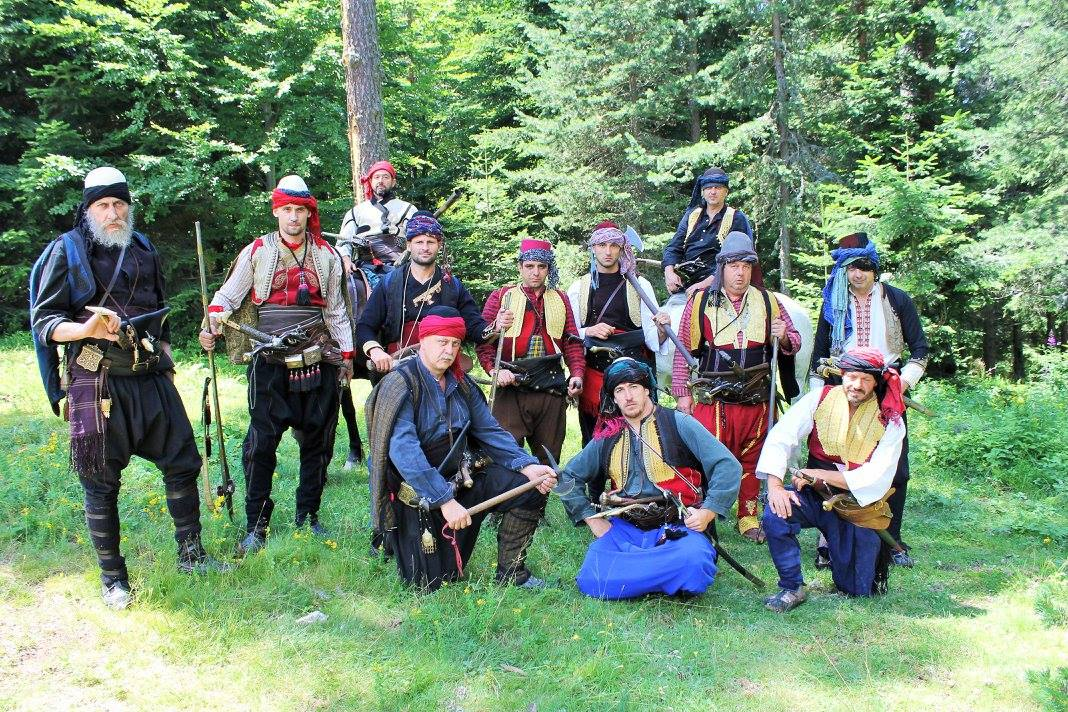
The Kirdzhalis, a modern reconstruction.

The Russo-Turkish War (1768–1774) catalyzed the process of Bulgarian National Awakening to massification, as a result of which the so-called Kirdzhalis appeared, to which Pushkin dedicated his work of the same name (Kirdzhali). The most prominent leaders are Osman Pazvantoğlu and Ali Pasha of Ioannina. The Nizam-I Cedid is a kind of denial of the entire history of the Ottoman Empire and an emanation of the Bulgarian National Awakening.

In April 1876 the Bulgarians revolted in the April uprising. It was organised by the Bulgarian Revolutionary Central Committee, and inspired by the insurrection in Bosnia and Herzegovina the previous year. The revolt was largely confined to the region of Plovdiv, certain districts in northern Bulgaria, Macedonia, and in the area of Sliven. The uprising was brutally crushed by the Ottomans who brought irregular Ottoman troops (bashi-bazouks) from outside the area. Many villages were pillaged and around twelve thousand people were massacred, the majority of them in the insurgent towns of Batak, Perushtitza and Bratzigovo in the area of Plovdiv. The massacres aroused a broad public reaction led by liberal Europeans such as William Ewart Gladstone, who launched a campaign against the "Bulgarian Horrors". The campaign was supported by a number of European intellectuals and public figures, such as Charles Darwin, Oscar Wilde, Victor Hugo and Giuseppe Garibaldi.

== Future nation-building ==
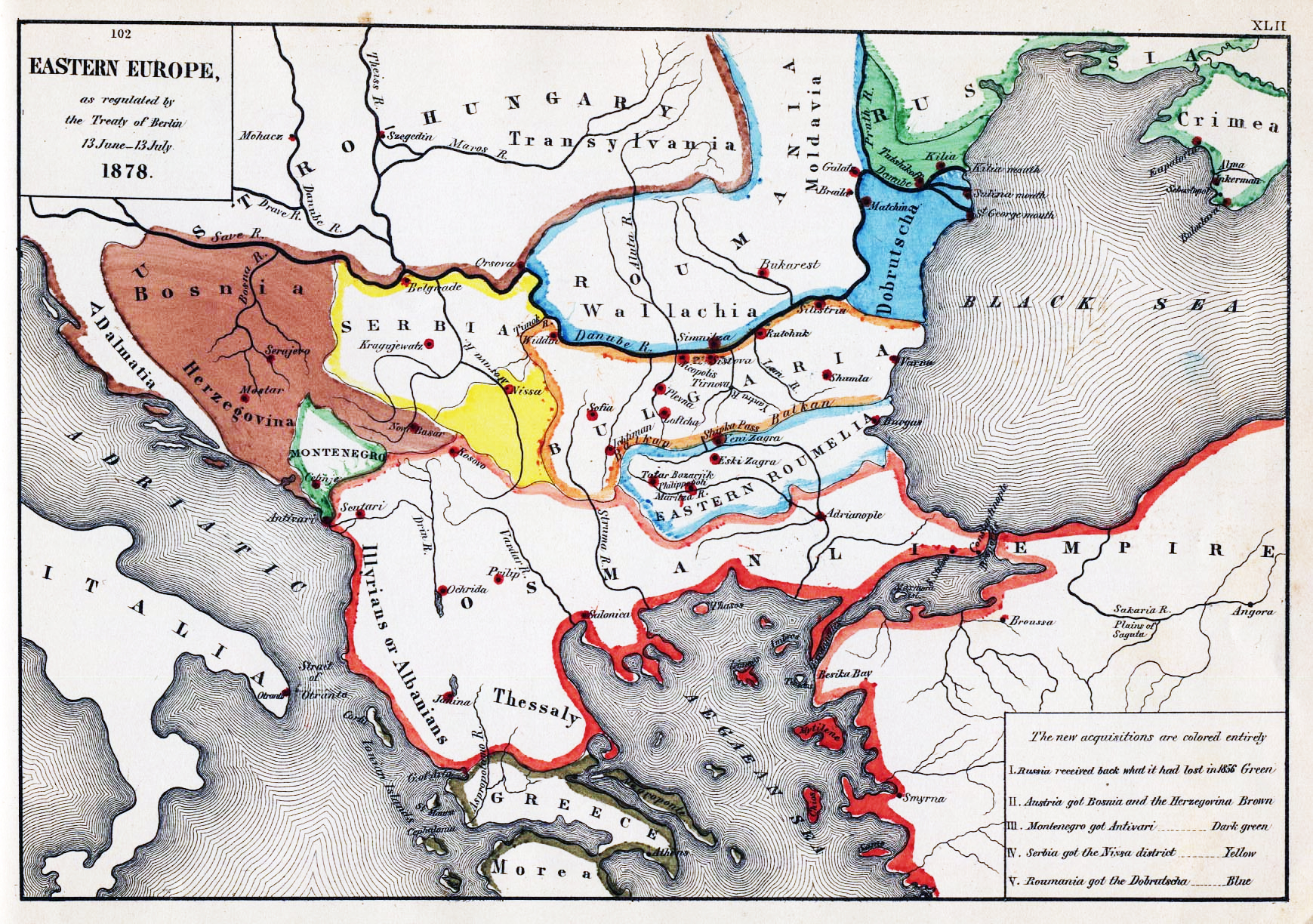
Southeastern Europe after the Congress of Berlin.

In the 19th century, as a result of the Greek Plan and the Eastern Question, the Liberation of Bulgaria was realized.

In the Treaty of San Stefano, Russia proposed creating a large Bulgarian state, embracing almost all of the lands populated by Bulgarians. The Sultan was in no position to resist, but the other powers were not willing to allow the dismemberment of the Ottoman Empire or the creation of a large Pro-Russian state on the Balkans. According to Philip Roeder, the Treaty of San Stefano "transformed" Bulgarian nationalism, turning it from a disunited movement into a united one.

As a result of the Treaty of Berlin, a Principality of Bulgaria was created, between the Danube and the Stara Planina range, with its seat at the old Bulgarian capital of Veliko Turnovo, and including Sofia. This state was to be under nominal Ottoman sovereignty but was to be ruled by a prince elected by a congress of Bulgarian notables and approved by the Powers. They insisted that the Prince could not be a Russian, but in a compromise Prince Alexander of Battenberg, a nephew of Tsar Alexander II, was chosen.

Between the Stara Planina and the line of the Rhodope Range, which runs about 50 km north of the modern border between Bulgaria and Greece, the autonomous province of Eastern Rumelia was created. With its capital at Plovdiv, it was to be under Ottoman sovereignty but governed by a Christian governor appointed by the Sultan with the approval of the Powers. This hybrid territory was governed by Alexander Bogoridi for most of its brief existence.

== See also ==
- National awakening of Bulgaria
- Bulgarian Land Army (1810-1812)
- Bulgarian Exarchate
- April Uprising of 1876
- Constantinople Conference
- Treaty of San Stefano
- Congress of Berlin
- Kresna–Razlog uprising
- Bulgarian unification
- Ilinden-Preobrazhenie Uprising
- Bulgarian Declaration of Independence
- Greater Bulgaria
- Time of Parting (novel)
- Golden Age of medieval Bulgarian culture
- Greek National Awakening
