= Nations and Nationalism (journal) =

- Discipline: International relations
- Language: English
- Edited by: Anthony D. Smith

Publication details
- History: 1995–present
- Publisher: Wiley-Blackwell
- Frequency: Quarterly
- Impact factor: 2.058 (2021)

Standard abbreviations
- ISO 4: Nations Natl.

Indexing
- CODEN: NANAFB
- ISSN: 1354-5078 (print); 1469-8129 (web)
- LCCN: 95659081
- OCLC no.: 32451283

Links
- Journal homepage; Online access; Online archive

Nations and Nationalism is a peer-reviewed academic journal that covers research on nationalism and related issues. It is published quarterly on behalf of the Association for the Study of Ethnicity and Nationalism by Wiley-Blackwell. Anthony D. Smith was the founding editor and the editor until his death in 2016.

== Aims ==
The first issue of Nations and Nationalism was published in March 1995. In their editorial for that issue, Anthony D. Smith, Obi Igwara, Athena Leoussi, and Terry Mulhall described the need for a journal devoted to the study of nations and nationalism, and identified the three basic aims of the journal as "(1) to be the vehicle of new research, both theoretical and empirical, and act as a forum for the exchange of views in the field; (2) to identify and develop a separate subject-area as a field of study in its own right, and unify the body of scholars in the field; [and] (3) to bring to the attention of the wider scholarly community, and the public, the need to treat the subject-area as a well-defined field of interdisciplinary study, which requires the collaboration of scholars from a variety of intellectual backgrounds".

== Abstracting and indexing ==
Nations and Nationalism is abstracted and indexed in Academic Search Premier, CSA Biological Sciences, Environmental Sciences & Pollution Management, Current Contents/Social & Behavioral Sciences, EBSCO Sociological Collection, GEOBASE, International Bibliography of the Social Sciences, ProQuest, Scopus and the Social Sciences Citation Index.

According to the Journal Citation Reports, the journal has a 2014 impact factor of 0.444, ranking it 12th out of 15 journals in the category "Ethnic Studies", 22nd out of 87 journals in the category "History", 107th out of 142 journals in the category "Sociology" and 111th out of 161 journals in the category "Political Science".

== See also ==
- Nationalism studies
- National Identities
