= Primordialism =

Idea that nations or ethnic identities are fixed, natural and ancient

Primordialism is the idea that nations or ethnic identities are fixed, natural, and ancient. Primordialists argue that each individual has a single inborn ethnic identity independent of historical processes. While implicit primordialist assumptions are common in society and academic research, primordialism is widely rejected by scholars of nationalism and ethnicity, as individuals can have multiple ethnic identities which are changeable and socially constructed.

== Term ==
The term primordialism is associated with sociologist Edward Shils and anthropologist Clifford Geertz. Shils was the first one who used this term in 1957 to describe the bonds between family members. The relations between family members cannot be interpreted as any interpersonal relations, but have a quality of their own which can only be described as "primordial" and which derives from the bond of blood.

The meaning of the term was later expanded by Clifford Geertz, according to whom relations of individuals to a community result from their birth into that community, as they inevitably acquire the community's language and social practices. According to Geertz, individuals' ties to certain groups are "natural" and do not result from social interaction. Furthermore, such spiritual bonds exist in all societies and accompany all individuals, although the strength of the primordial connections may vary at the individual level, from society to society, or across time.

However, political scientist John Coakley does not name Shils or Geertz as the first theorists or adopters of the concept of primordialism, although he discusses their works. According to Coakley, neither Shils nor Geertz could be considered primordialist thinkers, since Shils only described subjectively perceived blood ties and the importance of kinship as such. Geertz, according to Coakley, also did not try to show that the bonds between group members are objectively natural and "given", but only assumed to be "given" by the group members themselves which is inconsistent with the concept of primordialism.

== Idea ==
Primordialism can be traced philosophically to the ideas of German Romanticism, particularly in the works of Johann Gottlieb Fichte and Johann Gottfried Herder. For Herder, the nation was synonymous with language group. In Herder's thinking, language was synonymous with thought, and as each language was learnt in community, then each community must think differently. This also suggests that the community would hold a fixed nature over time.

There are conflicting opinions about the nature of primordialist theory. According to the radical primordialist view, the identity of national groups is determined by biological characteristics and genes. Critics of primordialism, anthropologist Jack David Eller and sociologist Reed M. Coughlan, believe that primordialist view based on Geertz's ideas can lead to such a radical conclusion, since it perceives ethnic identity as an inexplicable, but at the same time an essential emotional phenomenon, which leads to the mystification of national emotions and, in turn, facilitates radical conclusions.

However, political scientist Henry E. Hale, for example, finds that primordialists are generally not as dogmatic as their critics seem to think. He emphasizes that researchers representing primordialist views generally do not think that ethnicity is determined by blood ties or genes, but rather consider that while the connections between oneself and certain ethnic groups are cognitive, the characteristics of the groups that form the basis of this cognition have been developed and remain stable over a long period of time. According to Hale, the primordialist view of the nation relies heavily on the construction of social structures. Society is divided into groups which, by having various group characteristics (such as culture, traditions, history, physical characteristics, language, religion), are sufficiently distinct from each other. At the group level, these characteristics remain broadly unchanged, and kinship ties between individuals carry these characteristics on and hold the group together.

Political scientist Murat Bayar also believes that primordialism is characterized not so much by the view that nationality is determined by nature or genes, but rather by the understanding of the permanence of ethnic identity. In other words, once the identity of a national group is established, it generally does not change very easily. According to Bayar, primordialists believe that although mother tongue, religion or culture are not transmitted by genes, the process of their formation is primordially given, insofar as individuals cannot choose which parents or cultural environment they are born into. This fact cannot be changed by later individual choices.

Primordialism was widely discredited after the Second World War, with many scholars of nationalism coming to treat the nation as a community constructed by the technologies and politics of modernity (see Modernism).

== See also ==
- Essentialism
- Ethnic conflict
- Biological determinism
- Linguistic relativity
- Modernization theory (nationalism)
- Nativism (politics)
- Nationalism studies
- Origin myth
- Jus sanguinis
- Social constructionism

== Sources ==
- Bayar, Murat, ‘Reconsidering Primordialism: an alternative approach to the study of ethnicity’, Ethnic and Racial Studies, 32.9, (2009), pp. 1–20.
- Coakley, John. (2018). "‘Primordialism’ in nationalism studies: theory or ideology?" Nations and Nationalism 24, no. 2: 327–347.
- Eller, Jack David and Reed M. Coughlan. (1993). "The Poverty of Primordialism: The Demystification of Ethnic Attachments". Ethnic and Racial Studies 16, no. 2: 183–202.
- Gryosby, Steven, (1994) ‘The verdict of history: The Inexpungeable tie of Primordiality Huth – A Response to Eller and Coughlan’, Ethnic and Racial Studies 17(1), pp. 164–171
- Hale, Henry E. (2004). "Explaining Ethnicity". Comparative Political Studies 37, no. 4: 458–485.
- Harnischfeger, Johannes, "Secessionism in Nigeria", ECAS 4 conference, Uppsala, (2011)
- Jack Hayward, Brian Barry, Archie Brown (2003) The British Study of Politics in the Twentieth Century, Oxford University Press, ISBN 0-19-726294-5
- Dominique Jacquin-Berdal (2002) Nationalism and Ethnicity in the Horn of Africa: A Critique of the Ethnic Interpretation Lewiston, New York: Edwin Mellen Press ISBN 0-7734-6954-0
- Norval, Aletta J. (2012). "The Politics of Ethnicity and Identity". The Wiley-Blackwell Companion to Political Sociology, edited by Edwin Amenta, Kate Nash and Alan Scott, 305–314. Chichester: Wiley-Blackwell.
