= Bulgarian Land Army =

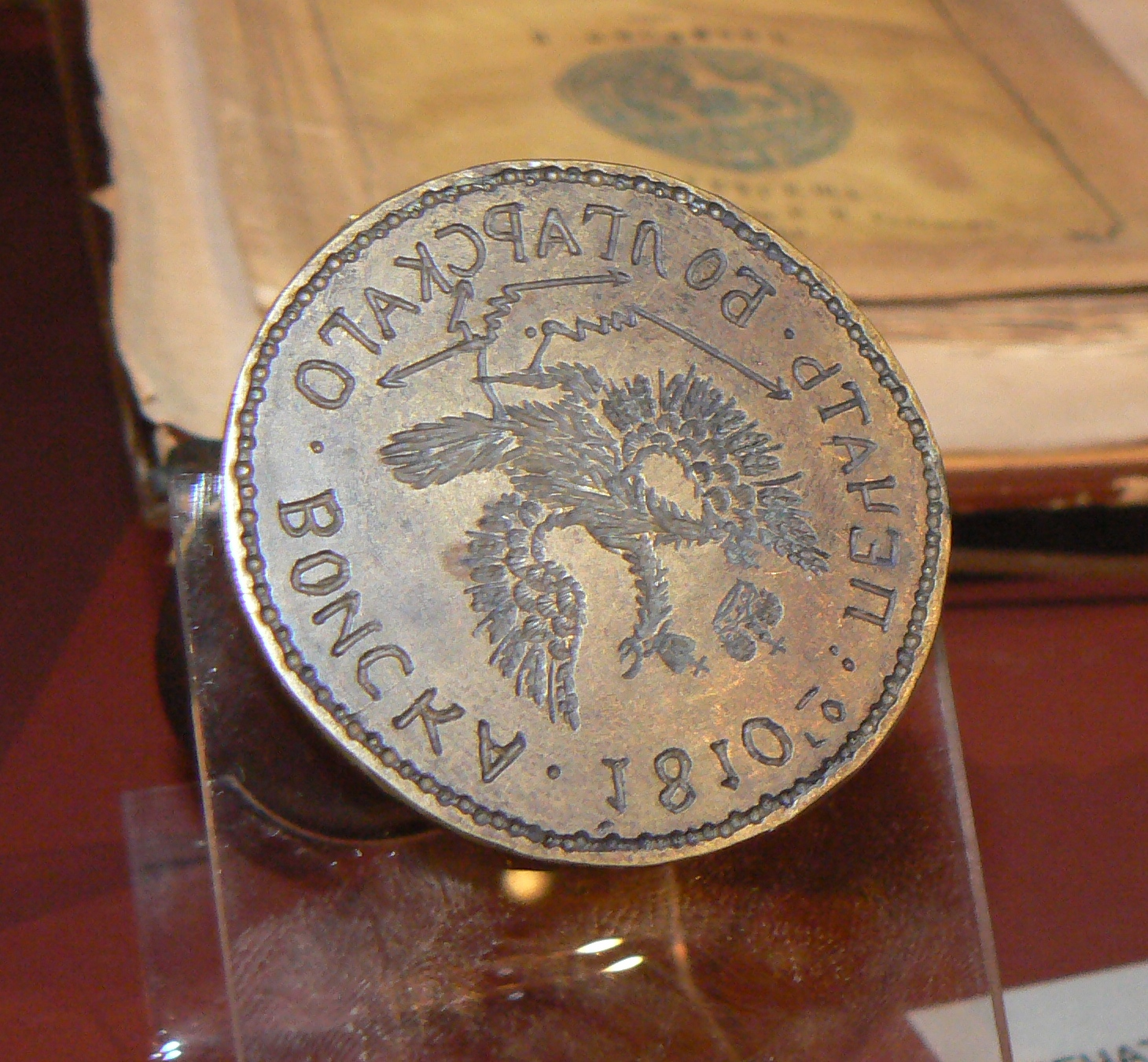
The seal of the Bulgarian Land Army (1810–1812).

The Bulgarian Land Army (1810–1812) was part of the Russian army. It was formed by volunteers in 1810 during the Russo-Turkish War (1806–1812) and consisted of 3,000 people in the form of Brigade. After the Treaty of Bucharest (1812) the Bulgarian army was transformed into a Battalion of 400 people and took part in the coverage of the French invasion of Russia and participated in the Battle of Borodino and in the Battle of Leipzig, and at the end of the war entered Paris. The army emerged immediately after the Ottoman coups of 1807–1808. During the ensuing Russo-Turkish War (1828–1829) the Bulgarian volunteers were led by Ivan Liprandi.

== See also ==
- Bulgarian National Awakening
- Greek Plan
- Kirdzhalis
- Bulgarian Volunteer Corps
