= Hindavi Swarajya =

Hindu nationalistic term of historical significance

Hindavi Swarajya (Hindavī Svarājya; "self-rule of Hindu people") is a term attributed to Shivaji, the founder of the Maratha Kingdom. The term Swaraj was later adopted by Bal Gangadhar Tilak, one of the early leaders of the Indian independence movement against the British Empire.

== Origin ==
Popular belief holds that the Maratha warrior Shivaji used the phrase Hindavi Swarajya in a letter to Dadaji Naras Prabhu Deshpande of Rohidkhore on 17 April 1645. The purported letter, in Marathi, states:

It is God Rohireshvar that has given us victory; and that God would enable us to fulfil our wish of Hindavi Swarajya. It is God's will that this kingdom should be established.

Scholars do not agree on the authenticity of the letter. Historian Setumadhavarao Pagadi states that a lot of the historical source material on Shivaji is spurious, contributed by various influential families of Maharashtra to show how close their ancestors were to Shivaji. J. V. Naik states that, irrespective of the authenticity of the letter, Shivaji's career itself amply demonstrates his conception of Swarajya.

== Interpretation ==
Swarajya (IAST: svarājya) is a Sanskrit term, whose meaning is "independent dominion or sovereignty" according to the Monier Williams dictionary. Pagadi notes that Shivaji had referred to his jagir in Pune as a rajya. He takes Swarajya to have meant a "homeland", and Hindavi Swarajya a "state of the sons of the soil".

Historian Irfan Habib states that the term "Hindu" had acquired a religious sense by this time (though not with the present day meaning) and so, other terms such as Hindi, Hindustani and Hindavi began to be employed to mean "Indian", spanning both Hindus and Muslims. According to Pagadi, Hindavi had the sense of "the sons of the soil" in this context. Pagadi also interprets it as "Indian rule".

Religious studies scholar Wilfred Cantwell Smith interprets Shivaji's Hindavi Swarajya to mean "Indian independence from foreign rule". William Jackson, while agreeing that it means independence from foreign rule, thinks its literal meaning is "self-rule of Hindu people."

== Bibliography ==
- Ali, M. Athar (January 1996), "The Evolution of the Perception of India: Akbar and Abu'l Fazl", Social Scientist, 24 (1/3): 80–88, doi:10.2307/3520120, JSTOR 3520120
- Habib, Irfan (July 1997), "The Formation of India: Notes on the History of an Idea", Social Scientist, 25 (7/8): 3–10, doi:10.2307/3517600, JSTOR 3517600
- Naik, J. V. (1975), "The Foundation of Swarajya", Shivaji and swarajya, Orient Longman, for Indian Institute of Public Administration. Maharashtra Regional Branch, pp. 43–57
- Pagadi, Setumadhava Rao (1983). Shivaji. National Book Trust, India.
- Pagadi, Setu Madhava Rao (1975), "The Life and Times of Chhatrapati Shivaji Maharaj", Shivaji and swarajya, Orient Longman, for Indian Institute of Public Administration. Maharashtra Regional Branch, pp. 1–42
- Smith, Wilfred C. (1981), On Understanding Islam: Selected Studies, Walter de Gruyter, ISBN 978-3-11-082580-0
- Wink, André (2007), Land and Sovereignty in India: Agrarian Society and Politics under the Eighteenth-Century Maratha Svarājya, Cambridge University Press, ISBN 978-0-521-05180-4
