= Daniele Conversi =

British political historian

- Occupations: Political historian, social theorist, academic, and author

Academic background
- Education: La Sapienza University; London School of Economics and Political Science

Academic work
- Institutions: Ikerbasque Foundation for Science; University of the Basque Country

Daniele Conversi is a political historian, social theorist, academic, and author. He is the son of the Italian particle physicist Marcello Conversi (1917–1988) and the painter and art gallery director Elena Lacava (1924–2005) and works as a research professor at the University of the Basque Country and the Ikerbasque Foundation for Science.

Conversi is most known for his contributions to the fields of political and social history, particularly for improving contemporary understanding of historical events, movements, and societal changes, specialising in Spain and the north Mediterranean. Best known for his comparative work on the cultural politics of nationalism and, more recently, for his research on nationalism and climate change. His books include Cambiamenti Climatici. Antropocene e Politica and The Basques, the Catalans and Spain:Alternative Routes to Nationalist Mobilization.

Conversi is Editor of Nations and Nationalism and Chief Editor of the journal Frontiers in Political Science.

== Education and career ==
Conversi completed his PhD in sociology at the London School of Economics and Political Science (LSE) in 1994 and began his academic career in 1992 as a part-time lecturer at the Departments of Sociology, Government, and International Relations at the LSE. Since 1995, he has held multiple academic appointments, including at Cornell University, Syracuse University, and, as Associate Professor, at the Central European University in Budapest. At present, he holds a joint position as Research professor at the University of the Basque Country and the Ikerbasque Foundation for Science.

== Research ==
Conversi's research work spans the areas of nationalism, climate change, environmental crisis, ethnicities, culture, European pluralism, globalisation and the mutual relationships between all of these. Most importantly, he has developed various new lines of research, including climate change and nationalism, cultural homogenisation and globalisation as homogenization.

=== Climate change and nationalism ===
Conversi's approach to the study of the relationship between climate change and nationalism centers on a number of interconnected ideas. He established that climate change negotiations have often been hampered, derailed, obfuscated, made difficult, and have even failed because of the combined pressures of nationalist politics and the vested interests of the fossil fuels industries. His work focuses on the need for global action to stem climate change and related crises (such as biodiversity loss, soil depletion, and the trespassing of other "planetary boundaries") – lest they result in irreversible damage for most forms of life, including human life. He has argued that scholars, analysts, and policymakers should adopt a nuanced approach when examining the enduring presence of nationalism. This approach moves beyond the realistic perspective seen in international relations (IR). Instead, he proposes that nationalism should be reframed as the major component of a broader emerging trend redefined as "survival cosmopolitanism". He has conceived the notion of a highly unconventional form of nationalism closely aligned with climate action, which he refers to as "green nationalism" (GN). His research, however, considers GN as a possibility, rather than a fully replicable reality, while other authors have expanded his concept into that of "reflexive green nationalism". Recent research has applied these concepts to various settings, particularly sub-state movements in Brittany, Corsica, Spain's Autonomous Communities, and to superpowers, such as the experiment of a "green nationalism with Chinese characteristics" in the People's Republic of China and Europe's green new deal, while further research has contrasted "exemplary nation-states" with "top polluting nation-states".

Building on Conversi's typologies of "green" and "resource nationalism", some scholars are nevertheless critical of his approach, remaining sceptical about the plasticity and adaptability of nationalism, either in general IR theory or in the study of pre-state nationalist movements, such as early Zionism.

Furthermore, Conversi has drawn attention to the vulnerability of subsistence societies to structural genocide resulting from the parallel pressures of neo-liberal globalisation and nation-state building. As these destructive forces can be compounded by climate change, he emphasizes the need to revisit theoretical assumptions and identify non-violent means to promote human survival and well-being across the planet.

In related research, Conversi demonstrates that nationalism, along with corporate interests and neo-liberal ideology, is a major barrier to addressing climate change and he proposes a conceptual framework to investigate whether nationalism can be mobilised to tackle this global crisis.

Most of his findings have been condensed in a book, published in Italian, entitled Cambiamenti Climatici. Antropocene e Politica.

=== Cultural homogenisation ===
Conversi has researched the phenomenon of cultural homogenisation as propelled by states and markets in the contexts of war, pre-war preparations, and post-war scenarios, highlighting instances such as the emergence of totalitarianism in the aftermath of World War I and the worldwide Americanisation movement that emerged after World War II. His broader comparative and theoretical research on the interaction between culture and politics converged with the study of the formation of sub-state nationalist movements and the politics of state-building. He analysed the cultural changes brought about by two significant political forces in the modern age: the centralising "nation-state" that reached its peak during World War II and the subsequent era of US-led neo-liberal globalisation.

Conversi's first book, The Basques, the Catalans, and Spain, examined how nationalist elites redefined "national culture", highlighting how forced assimilation and the erosion of regional distinctiveness played a significant role in fuelling the intensification of ethnonational conflicts. He has established that policies and practices aimed at promoting cultural similarity often lead to increased instability and conflict and noted that, in the context of ethnic conflict, perceived cultural dissimilarities, more than actual cultural differences, can be conductive to conflict-ridden relationships and violence.

Spanning the disciplinary boundaries between political theory and contemporary history, Conversi's research subsequently expanded into related areas, with a focus on the political and social history of cultural homogenisation. His work has linked cultural assimilation with the most devastating events of the twentieth century: militarism, war, ethnic cleansing, and genocide, where entire populations were targeted for elimination while being considered outdated, anti-entropic, or incompatible with the dominant "one nation-one state" paradigm of the early twentieth century.

=== Globalisation as homogenisation ===
Conversi's sociological analysis of globalisation has explored the relationship between homogenisation and globalisation. His research calls upon the scholarly community to identify a more reliable periodisation for the rise and spread of neo-liberal globalisation with the early 1980s as a potential chronological boundary for the advent of globalisation in the cultural, military, and economic spheres – coinciding with the advent of Thatcherism and Reaganism. In his examination of neo-liberal globalisation, he argues that this ideology tends to foster particularism rather than cosmopolitanism, in contrast with the claims made by post-Giddensian approaches centered on "cosmopolitan globalisation", such as Ulrich Beck's. His work redefines globalisation as a missed opportunity, leading to the global diffusion of an extremely narrow set of rules, values and cultural norms, mostly originating in the USA – rather than to more inter-cultural encounters and exchanges. In contrast with the customary "glocalization", "mélange", and "hybridity" hypotheses, he identifies a top-down pattern of cultural diffusion spreading in successive incremental waves since at least the 1920s, but only expressed at a mass global level since the 1980s – the era of neo-liberal globalisation. Focusing on the relationship between globalisation and majoritarian democracy, his work also challenges the prevailing theories of democratic peace (and failed democratisation) by highlighting the impact of neo-liberal globalisation and homogenising policies implemented by nation-states, which erode pre-existing democratic values and transform citizens into unprotected consumers.

Additionally, Conversi's research on the impact of globalisation on Europe's diversity contributes to an understanding of the complex relationship between cultural variation and transnational forces, highlighting the incompatibility of cultural standardising practices with EU institutions' policies.

While examining the relationship between modernity, globalisation, and nationalism, Conversi's work provides insights into the frenzied boundary-building process that emerges through the interaction of these forces as they shape social divisions and hierarchies through forms of power concentration, such as nation-building, imperialism, and colonialism. Expanding on the work of sociologist Zygmunt Bauman, he proposed the concept of liquid sovereignty, which reflects transformational notions of sovereignty due to changing ideas about territoriality and power and increased global interdependence.

=== Nationalism and modernisation ===
Conversi's research on nationalism emphasised the need to conceptually differentiate between culture and ethnicity, challenging the interchangeable usage of the two terms, as influenced by irreflexive forms of banal nationalism and media stereotypes that oversimplify conflicts by attributing them solely to intergroup differences. His research analysed modernism within specific national contexts, such as Italian futurism. He focused on new ways of conceptualising modernity and modernisation by identifying modernism as the driving ideological framework of the twentieth century, strongly associated with, but subordinated to, nationalism. These associations, particularly the post-Gellnerian critique, also pervade his approach to the study of climate change and nationalism.

=== Intersection of nationalism with war and ethno-symbolism ===
Conversi's early research investigates instrumentalism, primordialism, modernism, and perennialist theories, providing a comprehensive analysis of Anthony D. Smith's ethno-symbolic approach – to better understand the limitations that policymakers should consider when formulating conflict resolution strategies. His work challenges Ernest Gellner's view that industrialisation was the main or sole driver in the rise of homogenising nationalism, choosing to emphasise instead a reciprocal and symbiotic relationship between cultural homogenisation, nationalism, and militarisation. This highlights the historical significance of militarism in homogenising practices.

Connecting globalisation with monoculturalism, Conversi suggests that majoritarian democracy may not offer the optimal mechanism for resolving nationalist conflicts, as it is prone to encouraging nationalism and associated discord owing to its emphasis on cultural homogenisation and majority dominance. His exploration of Italy's political Futurism confirms how art and cultural symbols were used to reinforce national identity and mobilise intellectuals in preparation for war and, later, adherence to the Fascist regime. In this way, he highlights Futurist opposition to international anarchism in nation-building projects, while it managed individual diversities and local identities in an effort to reject attachment to the past.

== Bibliography ==
=== Books ===
- Cambiamenti Climatici. Antropocene e Politica (2022) ISBN 9791220600675
- The Basques, the Catalans and Spain (1997) ISBN 9781850652533

=== Selected Articles ===
- Conversi, D. (1990). Language or race?: The choice of core values in the development of Catalan and Basque nationalisms. Ethnic and Racial Studies, 13(1), 50–70.
- Conversi, D. (1995). Reassessing current theories of nationalism: nationalism as boundary maintenance and creation. Nationalism and Ethnic Politics, 1(1), 73–85.
- Conversi, D. (2006). Mapping the field: Theories of nationalism and the ethnosymbolic approach. Nationalism and ethnosymbolism: History, culture and ethnicity in the formation of nations, 15–30.
- Conversi, D. (2007). Homogenisation, nationalism and war: should we still read Ernest Gellner?. Nations and nationalism, 13(3), 371–394.
- Conversi, D. (2012). Irresponsible radicalisation: Diasporas, globalisation and long-distance nationalism in the digital age. Journal of Ethnic and Migration Studies, 38(9), 1357–1379.
- Cordell, K., & Wolff, S. (2016). The study of ethnic conflict: An introduction. In The Routledge handbook of ethnic conflict (pp. 1–11). Routledge.
- Conversi, D. (2018). The nation in the region: Flamenco and canzone napoletana as national icons in modern Spain and Italy (1880–1922). Nations and Nationalism, 24(3), 669–694.
- Conversi, D., & Machin-Autenrieth, M. (2019). The musical bridge—Intercultural regionalism and the immigration challenge in contemporary Andalusia. Genealogy, 4(1), 5.
- Conversi, D. (2020). The ultimate challenge: Nationalism and climate change. Nationalities Papers, 48(4), 625–636.
- Conversi, D., & Posocco, L. (2022). Which nationalism for the anthropocene? A comparative study of exemplary green nation-states. Frontiers in Political Science, 36.
