= Canadian Review of Studies in Nationalism =

- Discipline: Political science
- Language: English, French, German

Publication details
- History: 1973-2004
- Publisher: University of Prince Edward Island (Canada)
- Frequency: Annual

Standard abbreviations
- ISO 4: Can. Rev. Stud. Natl.

Indexing
- ISSN: 0317-7904

The Canadian Review of Studies in Nationalism was a peer-reviewed academic journal covering research on nationalism and related issues. It was established in 1973 at the University of Prince Edward Island by its editor-in-chief, Thomas Spira. The journal was published annually until it was discontinued in 2005.
