= Miroslav Hroch =

Czech historian and academic

- Born: 14 June 1932; Prague, Czechoslovakia
- Education: Charles University
- Occupation: historian
- Employer: Charles University

Prof. Miroslav Hroch (born 14 June 1932 in Prague) is a Czech historian and political theorist and a professor at the Charles University in Prague.

Hroch earned his PhD at the Charles University in 1962. On May 30, 1997 Hroch received an honorary doctorate from the Faculty of Humanities at Uppsala University, Sweden

Miroslav Hroch has earned international academic renown for his works about formation and evolution of the national movements of Central and Eastern European nations. He has significantly contributed to the establishment of comparative history as a research field in East-Central Europe.

Hroch defined three chronological stages in the creation of a nation:

- Phase A: Activists strive to lay the foundation for a national identity. They research the cultural, linguistic, social and sometimes historical attributes of a non-dominant group in order to raise awareness of the common traits—but they do this "without pressing specifically national demands to remedy deficits."
- Phase B: "A new range of activists emerged, who sought to win over as many of their ethnic group as possible to the project of creating a future nation."
- Phase C: The majority of the population forms a mass movement. "In this phase, a full social movement comes into being and movement branches into conservative- clerical, liberal and democratic wings, each with its own program."

Hroch's definition of nation: "Now the 'nation is not, of course, an eternal category, but was the product of a long and complicated process of historical development in Europe. For our purposes, let us define it at the outset as a large social group integrated not by one but by a combination of several kinds of objective relationships (economic, political, linguistic, cultural, religious, geographical, historical), and their subjective reflection in collective consciousness.

Many of these ties could be mutually substituable - some playing a particularly important role in one nation-building process, and no more than a subsidiary part in others. But among them, three stand out as irreplaceable:

1. a 'memory' of some common past, treated as a 'destiny' of the group - or at least of its core constituents;
2. a density of linguistic or cultural ties enabling a higher degree of social communication within the group than beyond it;
3. a conception of the equality of all members of the group organized as a civil society."

== Books ==
- Social preconditions of national revival in Europe, 1985, English translation of Die Vorkämpfer der nationalen Bewegungen bei den kleinen Völkern Europas, Praha, 1968, .
- In the National Interest. Demands and goals of European national movements of the nineteenth century: a comparative perspective, 2000.
- European nations. Explaining their formation, 2015, English edition of Das Europa der Nationen, 2005.

== See also ==
- National revival
- National awakening (disambiguation)
