= Thomas Spira =

- Born: December 28, 1923; Bratislava, Czechoslovakia
- Died: September 26, 2005 (aged 81); Charlottetown, Canada
- Education: B.A., City College of New York; M.A., Ph.D., McGill University
- Occupation: Historian
- Employer: University of Prince Edward Island
- Title: Professor Emeritus

Thomas Spira (1923–2005) was Professor of History at the University of Prince Edward Island and editor of the Canadian Review of Studies in Nationalism, the first academic journal devoted to the study of nationalism. Born in Bratislava, Czechoslovakia, Spira moved to the United States just before the outbreak of World War II. He enrolled in the Bachelor of Arts program at the City College of New York in 1964, and later completed his M.A. and Ph.D. in History at McGill University in Montreal. Spira began teaching at the University of Prince Edward Island in 1980, and was named Professor Emeritus by its Board of Governors in 1998.

== Selected publications ==
- Spira, Thomas (1977), German-Hungarian Relations and the Swabian Problem from Károlyi to Gömbös, Boulder, Colorado: East European Monographs, ISBN 0-914710-18-4
- Spira, Thomas (1999), Nationalism and Ethnicity Terminologies: An Encyclopedic Dictionary and Research Guide, Gulf Breeze, FL: Academic International Press, ISBN 0-87569-205-2
- Spira, Thomas (2004), "Ethnicity and nationality: the twin matrices of nationalism", Ethnonationalism in the Contemporary World: Walker Connor and the Study of Nationalism, London: Routledge, ISBN 978-0-415-33273-6
