= Setumadhavarao Pagadi =

Sethu Madhav Rao Pagdi
- Born: August 27, 1910; Nilanga, Hyderabad State (present-day Maharashtra)
- Died: October 14, 1994 (aged 84)
- Education: B.A., M.A
- Alma mater: Benares Hindu University; Allahabad University
- Occupations: historian, administrator
- Awards: Padma Bhushan (1992)

Setumadhavarao Pagdi or Sethu Madhav Rao Pagdi (27 August 1910 – 14 October 1994) was an Indian civil servant, a polyglot linguist, an accomplished historian and a distinguished man of letters specialised in modern Maratha history, especially the history of Shivaji. He also worked as the secretary of Government of Maharashtra. As a secretary he did his job fairly well. Setu Madhavrao was well versed in Marathi, English, Hindi, Sanskrit, Urdu and Persian, apart from Kannada, which was his mother tongue. As a linguist he discovered the sound system and Grammars of tribal languages like Kolami and Gondi. He was one who served the cause of Marathi against all odds in pre and post - Independent Hyderabad state. Following in the footsteps of the noted Bengali historian Jadunath Sarkar, Setu Madhavrao wrote Shivaji's biography in Marathi and English and the theory enkindled the spirit of nationalism in his readers.

The Government of India awarded him the civilian honour of the Padma Bhushan in 1992.

== Early life ==
Madhavrao was born on 27 August 1910 in Nilanga, Hyderabad State (now part of Maharashtra) into a Deshastha Madhva Brahmin family of landlords. He was educated in Gulbarga, Osmanabad, and Pune. He obtained his Bachelor of Arts degree from Banaras Hindu University in 1930 and Master of Arts degree from Allahabad University three years later.

He was well-versed in Marathi, Kannada, English, Hindi, Sanskrit, Urdu, Persian, Telugu and tribal languages like Gondi and Kolami

== Literary works ==
=== In English ===
- Among the Gonds of Adilabad, 1949
- Grammar of the Kolami Language, 1950
- Grammar of the Gondi Language, 1954
- Tribal Welfare in Adilabad, 1950
- History of Freedom Struggle in Hyderabad: 1800-1920 (Edited work in three volumes), 1956
- Eighteenth Century Deccan, 1963
- Maratha Mughal Relations: 1680-1707, 1966
- Studies in Maratha History Vol. 2, 1971
- Srinath Madhavji Shinde alias Alijah Mahadji Scindia of Gwalior

=== In Marathi ===
- Usha, a collection of short stories, 1938
- Ashokachi Pane, a collection of essays, 1941
- Warangalche Kakatiya Raje, 1946
- Sufi Sampraday, Tatvadnyan Ani Karya, 1953
- Mirza Ghalib Ani Tyachya Ghazala, 1958
- Panipatcha Sangram, 1961
- Marathe Va Aurangzeb, 1963
- Mogal Maratha Sangharsh (मोगल मराठा संघर्ष), 1965
- Tahmasnama, 1967
- Shivacharitra: Ek Abhyas, 1971
- Chhatrapati Shivaji, 1974
- Shree Samarth ani Samarth Sampraday, 1985
- भारतीय मुसलमानः शोध आणि बोध
- १८५७चे आणखी काही पैलू

== Bibliography ==
- Deshpande, El. Es (2005). Narhar Kurundkar. Sahitya Akademi. ISBN 9788126020393.
