= Liah Greenfeld =

Sociologist and anthropologist (1954–2026)

- Born: August 22, 1954
- Died: May 13, 2026 (aged 71)
- Known for: Trilogy of Nationalism

Academic background
- Education: The Hebrew University of Jerusalem

Liah Greenfeld (22 August 1954 – 13 May 2026) was an Israeli-American Russian-Jewish interdisciplinary scholar engaged in the scientific explanation of human social reality on various levels, beginning with the individual mind and ending with the level of civilization. She has been called "the most iconoclastic" of contemporary sociologists and that her approach represents the major alternative to the mainstream approaches in social science.

== Biography ==
Liah Greenfeld was born in Vladivostok, USSR, in 1954. Both her parents (Vladimir/Ze’ev Grinfeld and Viktoria Kirshenblat) were physicians, educated in Leningrad, who worked in the first hospital opened in the port of Nakhodka. They asked to be sent to the Far East to be near her father's parents: her paternal grandfather, in the GULAG in the Arctic since 1938 and just released, was there in exile. This grandfather, Natan Grinfeld, was a Russian revolutionary, Soviet diplomat and movie producer, political prisoner in both Tsarist and Soviet Russia. His wife, Greenfeld's paternal grandmother, a physician, exiled from Leningrad to Central Russia, joined him there. Greenfeld's maternal grandfather, Mikhail D. Kirschenblat, died in 1937 under torture during an interrogation by NKVD. He was a brother of Yakov D. Kirschenblat, a prominent biologist and a cousin of Yevgeny Primakov, a future Russian Prime Minister. His wife, Greenfeld's maternal grandmother Emma, was arrested several months later as a “wife of the enemy of the people” and spent ten years in the GULAG. Greenfeld's parents, dissidents from the get-go, tried to emigrate to Israel since 1967, and were among the first “refuseniks” – the only ones in Sochi, where they lived at the time. They obtained the permission to leave in 1972.

In Sochi, before she emigrated to Israel with her parents, Greenfeld was first known as a child prodigy, playing violin on TV at the age of 7, receiving the Krasnodar Region's Second Prize for poetry (and a bust of Pushkin) at 16, and publishing a collection of poems, under a properly Russified alias, in Komsomolskaya Pravda.

Greenfeld received her doctoral degree in Sociology and Anthropology at the Hebrew University in Jerusalem in 1982. In the same year, she came to the United States as a postdoctoral fellow and a lecturer at the University of Chicago. She moved on to hold positions of Assistant and later the John L. Loeb Associate Professor of Social Sciences at Harvard during 1985–1994. In 1994 she joined Boston University as a University Professor and Professor of Political Science, Sociology and Anthropology.

At various periods, Greenfeld has held visiting positions at RPI, MIT, the Ecole des Hautes Etudes en Sciences Sociales in Paris, Lingnan University and the Open University of Hong Kong. She was a recipient of the UAB Ireland Distinguished Visiting Scholar Award, fellowships from the Institute for Advanced Studies, the Woodrow Wilson International Center for Scholars, and the Institute for Advanced Studies in Jerusalem, Israel. She received grants from the Mellon, Olin, and Earhart foundations, the National Council for Soviet & East European Research, and the German Marshall Fund of the United States. In 2002, she received the Kagan Prize of the American Historical Society for the best book in European History for her book The Spirit of Capitalism. In 2004, she was chosen to deliver the Gellner lecture at the London School of Economics, and in 2011, the Nairn Lecture at RMIT in Melbourne, Australia.

== Trilogy of Nationalism ==
=== Nationalism: Five Roads to Modernity ===
In her first book on nationalism: Nationalism: Five Roads to Modernity, Greenfeld examines the emergence and spread of nationalism in the first five societies which defined themselves as nations—England, France, Russia, Germany and the United States. She traces the birth of the idea of the nation to 16th century England. This idea, she argues, was brought about by the historical accident of the Wars of the Roses which created a vacuum in the upper strata of English feudal society leading to an unprecedented amount of upward social mobility. Such upward mobility was a new, bewildering (anomic), yet positive experience for many of the English people. It required justification because it could not be made sense of within the framework of their previous—feudal—consciousness. At that time, the word “nation” meant an elite. The English defined the English people – the word “people” was, at that time, defined as the lower classes –as a nation, elevating the entire population to the dignity of the elite. With this definition, our distinctly modern world was brought into being.

Nationalism, fundamentally, is the equation of the "people" with the "nation". It destroyed the traditional social hierarchy and, with national identity, granted people dignity, which was previously enjoyed only by the elites. National identity, as such, is a dignifying identity: it makes dignity the experience of every member of a nation. Once one experiences dignity, it cannot be given up. The fundamental equality of national membership also implies an open and inclusive social stratification which encourages all people to mobilize and to play the active political and cultural role formerly played only by the elites. The people become the bearer(s) of the sovereignty, replacing God and king, and have the freedom and right to decide their own as well as the common destiny. Popular sovereignty, together with fundamental equality of membership, as well as secularization, are the three core principles of nationalism.

Presupposing an open system of social stratification, at the core of nationalism lies a compelling, inclusive image of society and an image of a sovereign community of fundamentally equal members. Ruled by the people, national community is no longer an estate created by God and owned by the monarch. It requires an impersonal form of government, in distinction to earlier forms of government, called the state.

Greenfeld also argues that democracy is logically implied in nationalism because of the principles of popular sovereignty and equality of memberships. All modern states built under the influence of nationalism are, therefore, democracies. Depending on the initial definition of the nation (a composite entity or a collective individual) and the criteria of membership (civic/voluntary or ethnic), however, there exist three ideal types (in the Weberian sense) of nationalism – individualistic-civic nationalism, collectivistic-civic nationalism and collectivistic-ethnic nationalism. In the modern history of state-building, Greenfeld finds that individualistic-civic and collectivistic-civic nationalisms tend to result in liberal democracies (such as Britain, the United States and France), while collectivistic-ethnic nationalism seems to produce authoritarian democracies (such as Russia and Germany).

=== The Spirit of Capitalism: Nationalism and Economic Growth ===
In The Spirit of Capitalism: Nationalism and Economic Growth, Greenfeld argues, nationalism, being inherently egalitarian, necessarily promotes a type of social structure needed to develop the modern economy—that is, an open system of stratification which allows for social mobility, makes labor free and expands the sphere of operation of market forces. More important, however, is the fact that, because of the members’ investment in the dignity of the nation which is necessarily assessed in relation to the status of other nations, nationalism implies international competition. In order to sustain national prestige, nationalism presupposes a commitment to constant economic growth when economic achievement is defined as significant for national prestige and among the areas of international competition—historically, for instance, Russian nationalists have not designated the economic sphere as a venue for international competition. Modern economy is thus not self-sustaining. As Greenfeld argues, it is stimulated and sustained by nationalism.

In both the first and second books, Greenfeld also stresses that the anomic situations (anomie) in each society of the very first nations – England, France, Russia, Germany, the United States—were the main reason for the idea of the nation to spread in these societies. Her study of Japan and more recent observations on Chinese society, however, provide a corrective to this argument. In the introduction to recently published book, Globalization of Nationalism, she suggests that societies under the influence of Chinese civilization, which, unlike monotheistic societies, does not prioritize the logic of no contradiction, tend to be capable of coping with the anomic situations without major crises.

=== Mind, Modernity, Madness: The Impact of Culture on Human Experience ===
In the third book of the trilogy, Mind, Modernity, Madness: The Impact of Culture on Human Experience, Greenfeld first lays out the philosophical premises and a methodology for studying human experience by attempting to overcome the mind/body or psychophysical problem. The reviewer of the book in the American Journal of Sociology, Karen Cerulo, writes: "Greenfeld builds her argument on a theoretical foundation that challenges long-standing conceptions of mind. She suggests that we replace dominant dualistic approaches in this realm—those that partition the material and the spiritual—and instead treat reality as a tripartite structure "consisting of three autonomous but related layers, with the two upper ones being emergent phenomena—the layer of matter, the layer of life, and the layer of the mind". As her argument unfolds, she focuses more specifically on the qualities of mind, identifying the biological elements from which mind grows and by which its development is constrained. She also explores the ways in which symbolic culture transforms and expands the biological mind, making it a far more complex and dynamic entity that reforms and reconfigures itself, ever emerging in relation to changing environmental events."

Just as Darwin's theory of "survival of the fittest" and evolution resolved the conflict between philosophical materialists and philosophical idealists by providing a framework within which the autonomous biological reality of life could be studied scientifically, Greenfeld proposes a symbolic process consisting of two levels: culture and the mind. "Just like a species' habitat and the species itself for an organism, the symbolic process on the collective level, culture, represents the environment in which the mind (and, therefore, the brain which supports it) functions. Culture calls into being and shapes the structures of the mind, but it never determines them, for the necessary participation of the brain in every mental process precludes the possibility of such determination and instead makes every individual mind a (more or less) junior partner in the self creative cultural process." Within the biological reality, and its biological structures (such as the brain, the human genome, and human society), culture is an emergent environment in which the mind is created, and which itself is created by the products of the mind. This autonomous, self-iterating process, like the material and biological realities which underpin it, provides its own paradigm of scientific study (which Greenfeld dubs sociological mentalism). Greenfeld further identifies three possible, logically derived structures, or "functional systems", within the mind. "Within the mind, culture, supported by the imaginative capacities of the animal brain, transformed by the symbolic environment into the specifically human, symbolic imagination, necessarily creates three such 'structures,' which further distinguish the human mind from the mental life of animals. These structures are compartments of the self or I and include (1) identity—the relationally constituted self; (2) agency, will, or acting self, the acting I; and (3) the thinking self, 'I of self-consciousness' or the 'I of Descartes'."

Mind, Modernity, Madness demonstrates this model of the scientific study of culture and the mind, by focusing on "madness" or the "big three" mental diseases of schizophrenia, bipolar disorder, and depression. According to Greenfeld, modern culture is the result of the emergence of national consciousness. "Nationalism is, above all, a form of consciousness which projects the image of social/political reality as consisting of sovereign communities of inclusive (that is cutting through lines of status and class) identity, whose members are fundamentally equal." National consciousness presupposes a secular, egalitarian world-view, wherein all individuals are understood to be members of an inherently equal elite. All identities are imaginable and theoretically possible for all individuals within the secular egalitarian worldview. While this consciousness allows for endless possibility, it also requires endless choice. "It is modern culture—specifically the presumed equality of all members of society, secularism, and choice in self-definition, implied in the national consciousness—that makes the formation of the individual identity difficult.. .The more choices one has, the less secure one becomes in the choices already made (by one or for one) and making up one's mind—literally, in the sense of constructing one's identity—grows increasingly difficult." The burden of navigating these infinite choices falls upon the individual mind, and stymies the function of the will. Like any environmental stimulus on the body, the biological brain, within which the mind and culture function, is necessarily also physically affected (just as food choices affect the physical body, or a biological process such as a trophic cascade).

=== Criticisms ===
==== Nationalism: Five Roads to Modernity ====
In Nationalism: Five Roads to Modernity, Greenfeld confessed: "I was bewildered by the complexity of historical evidence and periodically discouraged by the sheer quantity of the material. At times I despaired of my ability not to sin against and yet make sense of it, and questioned the feasibility of historical sociology (either as historical or as sociology)" (Greenfeld 1992, 26). Referring to this admission, Raymond Pearson remarked: "In this one regard, historians would generally endorse her judgment." Pearson criticized Greenfeld's "scant respect for secondary literature" and her "Procrustean" approach. Pearson stressed that his review is by no means exhaustive: "To most historians, the objections to what the cover blurb calls 'this historically oriented work in sociology' are so numerous as to positively jostle for attention. Only a selection of complaints can be accommodated within the confines of this review." In his short review of Nationalism, Fritz Stern found the German section "particularly weak" and overall concluded: "The author's reach is far greater than her grasp."

===== Eurocentrism and Lack of Cross-Cultural Consideration =====
One of the most prominent criticisms of this work is its Eurocentric focus. In Nationalism: Five Roads to Modernity, Greenfeld primarily examines the development of nationalism in five Western nations: England, France, Germany, Russia, and the United States. Critics argue that this narrow focus overlooks the diverse ways nationalism has manifested in non-Western and postcolonial contexts, especially in Asia, Africa, and Latin America. The critique, as articulated by scholars like Partha Chatterjee and Benedict Anderson, is that Greenfeld's model of nationalism — as a natural outgrowth of modernity — cannot be applied universally. For example, in postcolonial societies, nationalism often arose as a response to colonial rule, which complicates Greenfeld's narrative of nationalism being inherently tied to modernity and liberal values.

==== The Spirit of Capitalism ====
Reviewing Spirit, Carl J. Strikwerda concluded in The American Historical Review: "this is an impressively wide ranging, provocative treatment of important questions that is maddeningly unsystematic and inconclusive." In The Journal of Modern History, Andre Wakefield wrote, also referring to Nationalism: "The two books also share many shortcomings: a lack of respect for historiography, a penchant for building broad generalizations out of meager anecdotal evidence, and a tendency to lodge historical 'examples' in a prefabricated schematic model." Charles Tilly also criticized Greenfeld's approach: "Greenfeld concentrates so heavily on ideological transformation that historically informed readers will constantly find themselves calling up unmentioned and unanswered alternative explanations." Tilly concluded: "Awaiting further specification and proof, we can cheer Greenfeld’s bold challenge to received wisdom."

==== Mind, Modernity, Madness ====
Referring to Mind, Modernity, Madness, Ann Goldberg wrote: "as a comprehensive history of the long-term development of mental illness, Mind is deeply problematic." Goldberg criticized Greenfeld's approach: "Greenfeld repeatedly invokes 'logic' and 'empiricism' as the basis for her analysis. In fact, Mind is a highly selective reading of the historical record based on the superimposition of a master narrative of modernization theory onto the sources and onto a theory of mental functioning." Referring to the book, Andrew Scull remarked: "It seemed to me so bizarre, so solipsistic, so lacking in connections to any substantial knowledge of the relevant subject matter, so convinced of its own validity though heedless of any systematic review of relevant evidence or any knowledge of what insanity has meant across time and place, that I was at a loss to understand how it had appeared under the imprint of a major university press." Scull went on: "Its historical portraits of early modern England, let alone European nation states in the same period, would baffle and infuriate any historian with even the most elementary knowledge of the periods she purports to discuss."

== Books ==
- 1988 Center: Ideas and Institutions (co-edited with Michel Martin), the University of Chicago Press.
- 1989 Different Worlds: A Study in the Sociology of Taste, Choice, and Success in Art, Rose Monograph Series of the Cambridge University Press.
- 1992 Nationalism: Five Roads to Modernity, Harvard University Press (Portuguese translation 1998; Spanish 2005; Russian 2008; Chinese 2010; Turkish, 2016)
- 1999 Nacionalisme i Modernitat, Catarroja: Editorial Afers, Universitat de Valencia (collection of essays)
- 2001 The Spirit of Capitalism: Nationalism and Economic Growth, Harvard University Press. (Chinese translations, 2004; trade edition, 2008)
- 2006 Nationalism and the Mind: Essays on Modern Culture, Oxford: Oneworld.
- 2012 The Ideals of Joseph Ben-David: The Scientist’s Role and Centers of Learning Revisited, (editor), Transaction Publishers.
- 2013 Mind, Modernity, Madness: The Impact of Culture on Human Experience, Harvard University Press.
- 2016 Advanced Introduction to Nationalism, Edward Elgar Publishing.
- 2016 Globalization of Nationalism: Political Identities around the World, (editor), European Consortium for Political Research, ECPR press.
- 2016 Pensar con Libertad: La humanidad y la nacion en todos sus estados. (Conversando con Marx, Weber, Durkheim, Ben-David, Shils, Aron, Bell, Gellner y Anderson), translated by Mar Vidal; with an introduction by Agusti Colomines and Aurora Madaula, Barcelona: Arpa & Alfil Editores.
- 2020 Research Handbook on Nationalism, Edward Elgar Publishing.
- 2026 Advanced Introduction to Nationalism, 2nd Edition, Edward Elgar Publishing.
