= National Identities =

- Discipline: National and ethnic identity
- Language: English
- Edited by: Pippa Catterall; David Kaplan, Samir Pandya, Becky Kook

Publication details
- History: 1999–present
- Publisher: Taylor and Francis (United Kingdom)
- Frequency: 5/year

Standard abbreviations
- ISO 4: Natl. Identities

Indexing
- ISSN: 1460-8944 (print); 1469-9907 (web)
- LCCN: sn99032499
- OCLC no.: 45007292

Links
- Journal homepage; Online access; Online archive

National Identities is a peer-reviewed academic journal on the topic of national and ethnic identity. It is published five times a year by Taylor & Francis. The journal was founded by Pippa Catterall (of the University of Westminster). In addition to Catterall, the current editors are David Kaplan (Kent State University), Samir Pandya (University of Westminster), and Becky Kook (Ben Gurion University).

== Aim ==
In the journal's inaugural issue, the editors described National Identities as a "forum" for discussion of "competing sources of identity, whether regional, tribal, religious or political.." and stated that "the prime unit of analysis" would be identity, "how it is expressed and mediated, and how it relates to the state and the problematic construction of the nation." According to David Kaplan, one of the journal's four editors and the journal's anchor editor, the goal of the journal is to "fill in some of those holes that were there between those different types of journals dealing with ethnicity on one hand and nations and nationalism on the other."

The Bibliographical Bulletin on Federalism describes National Identities as part of the trend towards globalization, which led to a, "growing interest in national identities."

== Abstracting and Indexing ==
According to Taylor & Francis, "National Identities is currently abstracted and indexed in British Humanities Index; CSA Worldwide Political Science Abstracts; Historical Abstracts; Index Islamicus; International Bibliography of the Social Sciences (IBSS); OCLC; Political Science and Government Abstracts; SCOPUS; Social Services Abstracts; Sociological Abstracts and Social Planning/ Policy and Development Abstracts."

== See also ==
- Nations and Nationalism
