= Studies in Ethnicity and Nationalism =

- Discipline: Political science
- Language: English
- Edited by: Dina Mansour-Ille; Anastasia Voronkova

Publication details
- Former name(s): The ASEN Bulletin
- History: 2001–present
- Publisher: Wiley-Blackwell
- Frequency: Biannual
- Impact factor: 0.73 (Scopus CiteScore) (2018)

Standard abbreviations
- ISO 4: Stud. Ethn. Natl.

Indexing
- ISSN: 1473-8481 (print); 1754-9469 (web)
- LCCN: 2002236147
- OCLC no.: 50525160

Links
- Journal homepage; Online access; Online archive

Studies in Ethnicity and Nationalism (SEN), formerly The ASEN Bulletin, is a scholarly interdisciplinary peer-reviewed academic journal covering research on ethnicity and nationalism. It is published biannually by Wiley-Blackwell on behalf of the London-based Association for the Study of Ethnicity and Nationalism. The journal covers a wide range of topics, including the sources and nature of ethnic identity, minority rights, migration and identity politics - topics which remain central to the modern world. The journal approaches the complexity of these questions from a contemporary perspective and, based on the latest scholarship, draws on a range of disciplines including political science, sociology, anthropology, economics, international relations, history and cultural studies. The journal is indexed in the Web of Science Emerging Sources Citation Index (ESCI), has 0.73 Scopus CiteScore (2018), and ranks 487 out of 1,111 journals in Sociology and Political Science.

SEN publishes three issues per volume, including regular special issues on themes of contemporary relevance. In addition to regular research manuscripts, each issue usually also has a features and a book reviews section. SEN aims to showcase exceptional articles from up-and-coming scholars across the world, as well as concerned professionals and practitioners in government, law, NGOs and the media, making it one of the first journals to provide an interdisciplinary forum for established and younger scholars alike. All articles are peer-reviewed by scholars who are specialists in their respective fields.

SEN has its own academic Webpage, which aims to showcase short reflections on recent events on issues of ethnicity and nationalism as well as articles published in the journal that have had significant impact or are of relevance to recent events in the world.

== Editorial team ==
The current editorial team consists of lead editor Dina Mansour-Ille and Anastasia Voronkova.
