= Gellner =

Gellner is a Jewish German surname, that may refer to:

- Ernest Gellner (1925–1995), British philosopher
- František Gellner (1881–1914), Czech writer
- Julius Gellner (1899–1983), Austrian theatre director

== See also ==
- 8222 Gellner, an asteroid
