= John Hutchinson (academic) =

British academic (born 1949)

- Born: 1949 (age 76–77); Warrenpoint, County Down, Northern Ireland, United Kingdom
- Education: University of Edinburgh, London School of Economics
- Occupation: Academic

John Hutchinson (born 1949) is a British academic. He is a reader in nationalism at the London School of Economics (LSE), in the Department of Government.

== Biography ==
John Hutchinson was born in Warrenpoint, County Down, Northern Ireland. He graduated with an MA in modern history from the University of Edinburgh, Scotland in 1970; and his PhD in sociology in 1985 from the London School of Economics, where he was supervised by Anthony D. Smith.

== Academic career ==
Before joining the LSE in 1999, Hutchinson taught in Australia at the interdisciplinary School of Humanities at Griffith University, from 1974 to 1979, and from 1986 to 1999, where he became associate professor.

He is vice-president of the Association for the Study of Ethnicity and Nationalism and deputy editor of Nations and Nations and Nationalism. In addition, he sits on the advisory boards of the Institute for the Advancement of the Social Sciences]at Boston University and of the Study Platform on Interlocking Nationalisms at the University of Amsterdam.

Hutchinson is an interdisciplinary scholar who has contributed to theories of nationalism, the study of cultural nationalism, notably in Ireland, warfare and nationalism.

He is a leading scholar of the ethnosymbolist school (established by Smith) that highlights the role of embedded historical memories in the formation of modern nations. His first monograph was The Dynamics of Cultural Nationalism. He is widely cited by scholars as a pioneering contribution to the field of Irish history and cultural nationalism.

Hutchinson rejected earlier scholarship that tended to conflate nationalism and state-seeking movements. He argued that cultural nationalists should be differentiated from political nationalists, in having as their goal the defence of the nation as a community and its historical distinctiveness rather than on the achievement of a state. He explains how cultural nationalists act as moral innovators, emerging at times of crisis, to form movements that offer new maps of identity based on historical myths, that in turn may inspire programmes of socio-political regeneration. Hutchinson argues such movements operate sometimes as complementary to and sometimes as communitarian alternatives to political nationalism, when statist strategies are defunct. He emphasises the dynamic role of historians and artists, showing how they interact with religious reformists and a discontented modernising intelligentsia to form national identities.

His second book, Modern Nationalism (Fontana 1994) applies this cultural approach to the analysis of contemporary politics, notably, the relationship of nationalism to the collapse of communism, the religious revival and contentions in multicultural polities. More recently, his Nations as Zones of Conflict (Sage 2005) has sought to combine the focus of ethnosymbolists on the historical embeddedness of nations with the stress of postmodernists on the multiplicity of identities by exploring nations as heterogeneous entities, characterised by persisting conflicts that derive from historic divisions (e.g., civil wars). Hutchinson argues that the role of contestation in nation-formation has been neglected. Such conflicts serve to "fill out" national identities and they give rise to alternative cultural and political visions that offer options to populations at times of crisis. This study has provoked praise and controversy. Eric Kaufmann claims "Hutchinson dramatically expands the boundaries of the ethnosymbolist argument to engage not only 'modernist' but postmodernist critiques of the nation." Although critical of what he sees as Hutchinson's idealist approach, Andreas Wimmer states: "(Hutchinson's) analysis of the layered character of nationalist myths, the internal heterogeneity and conflictual nature of nationalist discourse, as well as the episodic nature of nationalist mobilization represents a considerable step forward towards a more differentiated view of the nature of nationalism."

With Smith, Hutchinson co-edited Nationalism (Oxford 1994) and Ethnicity (Oxford 1996) that have become standard teaching texts for courses on nationalism in the English-speaking world, and his works have been translated into several languages, including Chinese, Norwegian and Turkish.

== Published works ==
- The Dynamics of Cultural Nationalism: The Gaelic Revival and the Creation of the Irish Nation State, (1987)
- Modern Nationalism (Fontana 1994)
- Nations as Zones of Conflict (SAGE Publications 2005)
- Hutchinson, John and Guibernau, Montserrat, (eds.) (2001) Understanding nationalism. Polity Press, Oxford. ISBN 978-0-7456-2402-0
- Hutchinson, John (2003) The past, present and future of the nation-state. Georgetown Journal of International Affairs, Winter/ Spring (1). pp. 7–14. ISSN 1526-0054
- Hutchinson, John (2003) Nationalism, globalism and the conflict of civilisations. In: Özkirimli, Umut, (ed.) Nationalism and its futures. Palgrave Macmillan, Basingstoke, pp. 71–92. ISBN 1-4039-1713-2
- Hutchinson, John and Guibernau, Monserrat, (eds.) (2004) History and national destiny: ethnosymbolism and its critics. Blackwell, Oxford. ISBN 1-4051-2391-5
- Hutchinson, John (2004) Myth against myth: the nation as ethnic overlay. Nations and Nationalism, 10 (1–2). pp. 109–124. ISSN 1354-5078
- Hutchinson, John (2005) Nations as zones of conflict. SAGE Publications, London. ISBN 0-7619-5727-8
- Hutchinson, John (2006) Hot and banal nationalism: the nationalisation of 'the masses'. In: Delanty, G and Kumar, K, (eds.) The SAGE handbook of nations and nationalism. SAGE Publications, London, pp. 295–306. ISBN 1-4129-0101-4
- Hutchinson, John (2007) Introducing 'The making of English national identity'. Nations and Nationalism, 13 (2). pp. 179–182. ISSN 1354-5078
- Hutchinson, John (2007) Warfare, remembrance and national identity. In: Leoussi, A and Grosby, S, (eds.) Nationalism and ethnosymbolism : history, culture and ethnicity in the formation of nations. Edinburgh University Press, Edinburgh, pp. 42–54. ISBN 0-7486-2112-1
- Hutchinson, John (2008) In defence of transhistorical ethnosymbolism: a reply to my critics. Nations and Nationalism, 14 (1). pp. 18–27. ISSN 1354-5078
- Hutchinson, John (2008) Anatomising Michael Mann. Journal of Power, 1 (1). pp. 87–93. ISSN 1754-0305
- Hutchinson, John (2017) Nationalism and War. Oxford: Oxford University Press.

== See also ==
- List of Brisbane people
- List of London School of Economics people
- List of people from Northern Ireland
- List of University of Edinburgh people
