= Greek National Awakening =

The concept and term "National Awakening" (Greek: Εθνική αφύπνιση) is used by many historians, intellectuals and lay authors to refer to the revival of the Greek national self-conscious, or modern Greek nationalism, which paved the way to the Greek War of Independence. Whereas most authors do not define the exact time-frame of this period, it is generally agreed that this awakening (or revival) occurred in the 18th century.

== Periodization ==
According to the Greek historian Nikos Svoronos (1911–1989), the period of the Greek National Awakening is 1715–1821. The periodization of exhibits in the National Historical Museum of Athens sets the beginning of the Awakening era at 1670. Other authors put the onset of this period in the mid 18th century. For example, a series of historical presentations by academic historians in the Greek State Television (ERT), defined as "National Awakening" period the years 1750–1821.

== Internal and external forces ==
The Greek – as well as other Balkan nations’ – awakening was generated by internal and external forces. Opposition to the Ottomans was the main internal impetus. The main external factor was the assistance from Russia, on the ground of the common religion and long historical bonds. Since the fall of Constantinople to the Turks, the Greek national aspirations for liberation were expressed in the form of popular oracle and prophecies, some of them alleging to the intervention of fair-haired people (xanthon genos) to help Greeks. In 1656, a prominent Greek clergyman interpreted the "fair-haired people" as the Russians. With the emergence of Russia as a big power in Eastern Europe, the Greek-Russian ties assumed a military and political dimension. Beginning with the 1711 Pruth Campaign, Peter the Great called for the cooperation of all Orthodox people under the Russian leadership, to fight for "the belief and the fatherland". After this campaign, the sultan appointed Greek Phanariots as governors of the Ottoman vassal territories of Wallachia and Moldavia. The Phanariots introduced an enlighted reform in their principalities, and produced a line of educated Greek and Balkan scholars who contributed to the national awakening of their respective countries. The Greek communities in Russia, as well as in the Western and Central Europe, were also a key factor to the Greek awakening.

== Treaty ==
After the Treaty of Kutchuk-Kainardji (1774) Russia assumed the role of protector of the Orthodox people subjects of the Ottoman Empire. After Peter the Great, Catherine II envisaged a "Greek Project" which involved a revival of a Greek state with Constantinople as capital, to be ruled by her grandson Constantine. The Russian expansionist policy greatly facilitated the modern Greek awakening, catalyzing key components such as military resistance, political activism, commercial growth, educational and cultural progress.

== Russia ==
Russia's wars against the Ottoman Empire in 18th early 19th century (1711, 1737–39, 1768–74, 1787–92, 1806–12), as well as the short-lived Russian occupation of the Ionian islands after the Napoleonic wars, nourished the Greek tradition of armed resistance to the Ottomans and helped Greeks to receive fighting experience. The most important Russian influenced revolutionary activities of the Greeks in 18th c. were the failed Orlov expedition in 1769-1770 and the Lambros Katsonis’ flotilla raids against the Turks in 1778-1792.

== National movement ==
Counter to the "national awakening" historiographic view is the one that emphasizes the importance of the French Revolution and Napoleon in the Greek and other Balkan national movements. Among the eminent works of this school in the 20th century are those of the Romanian historian N. Iorga (1934) and the Greeks A. Daskalakis (1937), N. Moschopoulos (1939) and other subsequent.

== Sources ==
- Clogg, Richard (20 June 2002). A Concise History of Greece. Cambridge University Press. ISBN 978-0-521-00479-4.
