= John Breuilly =

British academic (born 1946)

John Breuilly (born October 31, 1946) is professor of nationalism and ethnicity at the London School of Economics. Breuilly is the author of the pioneering Nationalism and the State (1982).

== Career ==
Breuilly taught at the universities of Manchester (1972–95) and Birmingham (1995–2004). He has been a visiting professor at the universities of Hamburg (1987-8) and Bielefeld (1992-3). He is currently professor of nationalism and ethnicity at the London School of Economics.

== Research and writing ==
Breuilly's research interests are "Nationalism and Ethnicity, Modern German History, Comparative European History with special interests in Labour Movements and the Bourgeoisie, Urban Cultural History in 19th Century Europe, Modern Liberalism". At the University of Manchester, Breuilly still regarded himself primarily as a historian of Germany when he became interested in nationalisms. He realised that the only way the book he was looking for on the subject would exist, was if he wrote it. His pioneering Nationalism and the State was published in 1982. Breuilly was also the editor of the Oxford handbook of the history of nationalism (2013).

== Selected publications ==
- Nationalism and the State. Manchester: Manchester University Press, 1982. ISBN 0719006929
- The Formation of the First German Nation-State 1800-1871. London: Palgrave Macmillan, 1996. (Studies in European History) ISBN 0312160291
- Austria, Prussia and Germany, 1806–1871. London: Longman, 2002. (Seminar Studies in History) ISBN 9780582437395
- Germany's Two Unifications: Anticipations, Experiences, Responses. London: Palgrave, 2004 (edited with Ronald Speirs. ISBN 1403946531
- La formazione dello stato nazionale tedesco (1800–1871). Bologna: Il Mulino, 2004. ISBN 8815096779
- "Nationalism" in: Dowding, Keith, (ed.) Encyclopedia of Power. London: SAGE Publications, 2011. ISBN 9781412927482
- The Oxford Handbook of the History of Nationalism. Oxford: Oxford University Press, 2013 (editor) ISBN 9780199209194
- Nineteenth-Century Germany: Politics, Culture, and Society 1780–1918. (2020) Second edition.
