= Anthony D. Smith =

British academic and sociologist

- Born: 23 September 1939; London, England
- Died: 19 July 2016 (aged 76); London, England
- Education: Oxford University (BA); London School of Economics (MSc, PhD)
- Occupation: Sociologist
- Employer: London School of Economics
- Title: Professor Emeritus

Anthony David Stephen Smith (23 September 1939 – 19 July 2016) was a British historical sociologist who, at the time of his death, was Professor Emeritus of Nationalism and Ethnicity at the London School of Economics. He is considered one of the founders of the interdisciplinary field of nationalism studies.

== Biography ==
Anthony D. Smith was born in London, into a Jewish family. His father was a British businessman, and his mother, Harriet, came from Wiesbaden. His family had roots in Poland for centuries, but during the Holocaust, 80 of their relatives lost their lives. These tragic events had a profound impact on Smith and shaped his interest in Jewish history and the existence of nations since ancient times.

Smith started his education in boarding schools and later studied classics and philosophy at Oxford University. After completing his undergraduate studies, he attended the College of Europe in Bruges, Belgium. He then pursued a master's degree in sociology at the London School of Economics (LSE), where he focused on nationalism. After completing his master's degree, he began a PhD under the supervision of the sociologist Ernest Gellner. His doctoral thesis, titled Theories of Nationalism, was later published as his first book. After earning his PhD, Smith began his academic career at the University of York before moving to the University of Reading. In 1980, he joined the Department of Sociology at LSE, where he became a professor in 1988. In 1996, he transitioned to the European Institute, and after its reorganization in 2002, he moved to the Government department. Smith retired in 2004. During his time at LSE, Smith published influential works on nationalism studies. He also developed academic programs for undergraduate, master's, and doctoral students, focusing on nationalism theories and comparative studies. Additionally, he co-founded the Association for the Study of Ethnicity and Nationalism (ASEN) with his PhD students, creating a platform for research in this field.

Smith's best-known contributions to the field are the distinction between 'civic' and 'ethnic' types of nations and nationalism, and the idea that all nations have dominant 'ethnic cores'. While Smith agrees with other authors that nationalism is a modern phenomenon, he insists that nations have premodern origins.

He is a former student of the philosopher and anthropologist Ernest Gellner, but he did not share his view of nationalism in the long run. He created an approach of nationalism he called ethnosymbolism. The Warwick Debate of October 24, 1995, held at Warwick University, exemplified the positions of Smith and Gellner, and clarified the definitions they used.

== Scholarship ==
=== Nationalism ===
Smith argues that nationalism draws on the pre-existing history of the "group", an attempt to fashion this history into a sense of common identity and shared history. That is not to say that this history should be academically valid or cogent, but Smith asserts that many nationalisms are based on historically flawed interpretations of past events and tend to mythologise small, inaccurate parts of their history. Moreover, Smith reasons that nationalistic interpretations of the past are frequently fabricated to justify modern political and ethnic positions.

Nationalism, according to Smith, does not require that members of a "nation" should all be alike, but only that they should feel an intense bond of solidarity to the nation and other members of their nation. A sense of nationalism can inhabit and be produced from whatever dominant ideology exists in a given locale. Nationalism builds on pre-existing kinship, religious, and belief systems. Smith describes the ethnic groups that form the background of modern nations as "ethnie".

While generally accepting nationalism as a modern phenomenon, Smith argued in 1993 that the collective identity of the Jews in the late Second Temple period makes it necessary to consider the possibility of "a form of religious nationalism, before the onset of modernity." Later, in 2008, he wrote that Jewish nationalism emerged under Roman rule with the Zealots and during the Bar Kokhba Revolt.

=== Nations and nation-states ===
When speaking of nation-states Smith notes, "We may term a state a ‘nation-state’ only if and when a single ethnic and cultural population inhabits the boundaries of a state, and the boundaries of that state are coextensive with the boundaries of that ethnic and cultural population".

Smith defines nationalism as "an ideological movement for attaining and maintaining autonomy, unity and identity on behalf of a population deemed by some of its members to constitute an actual or potential 'nation'".

A nation, meanwhile, is "a named population sharing a historic territory, common myths and historical memories, a mass public culture, a common economy and common legal rights and duties for its members". Ethnies are, in turn, defined as "named units of population with common ancestry myths and historical memories, elements of shared culture, some link with a historic territory and some measure of solidarity, at least among their elites". The boundaries of an ethnie can be quite recognisable even when not all of its characteristics appear at the same time. It is, in other words, not a question of a smallest common denominator.

Smith states that even when nations are the product of modernity, it is possible to find ethnic elements that survive in modern nations. Ethnic groups are different from nations. Nations are the result of a triple revolution that begins with the development of capitalism and leads to a bureaucratic and cultural centralisation along with a loss of power by the Church. Smith, however, maintains that there are also many cases of ancient nations and so cannot be considered a modernist. He is often regarded as the 'founding father' of ethno-symbolism. Smith's ethno-symbolist approach has been critically examined by several modernist scholars.

In his 2008 book, The Cultural Foundations of Nations, Smith compared several civilizations of the ancient Near East, including Judah/Judea, Egypt, Assyria, Persia, and Greece, to assess whether nations existed before the modern era. He concluded that only Egypt and Judah showed sufficient evidence to be defined as nations, arguing that both combined a strong political framework with a unifying religious ideology. Nevertheless, Egyptian religion, tied to the divine Pharaoh, left ordinary Egyptians increasingly distant from temple worship under foreign rule, allowing Christianity to displace it; Judaism, by contrast, married to the ideal of the Covenant, proved capable of transformation and increasingly embraced the wider population, particularly after the Maccabean Revolt and the rise of the Pharisees, through its combination of "God, Torah and Temple" and "myths of ethnic election and the Promised Land." Smith further argued that this "self-renewing religion," carried forward through Judaism, Christianity and Islam, strongly influenced the later development of nations.

=== Academic freedom ===
In 1987 Parliament proposed to subject the hitherto semi-autonomous British universities to much tighter state control. Concerned at the threat which this posed to individual academic freedom and to the independence of research and publication, Smith founded the Council for Academic Autonomy, and continued as its long-term Secretary. This scored an early success, arising from its petition to Parliament and its lobbying and representation in the House of Lords, in an amendment to the Education Reform Act 1988 guaranteeing freedom of expression and publication to academic staff in the older universities. The Council continued its interactions with Government and its organisation of symposia on academic independence into the early years of the millennium. See also Fergus Millar and Conrad Russell, 5th Earl Russell.

== Selected publications ==
- 1971, Theories of Nationalism, 0-7156-0555-0 (1st ed.); 0-7156-0584-4 (2nd ed., 1983)
- 1981, The Ethnic Revival in the Modern World, 978-0-5212-3267-8
- 1983, State and Nation in the Third World, 978-0-7108-0199-9
- 1986, The Ethnic Origins of Nations, 0-631-15205-9
- 1991, National Identity, 0-14-012565-5
- 1995, Nations and Nationalism in a Global Era, 0-7456-1018-8
- 1998, Nationalism and Modernism, 0-415-06340-X
- 1999, Myths and Memories of the Nation, 978-0-19-829684-3
- 2000, The Nation in History, 0-7456-2580-0
- 2001, Nationalism. Theory, Ideology, History, 978-0-7456-5127-9 (2nd ed., 2010)
- 2003, Chosen Peoples: Sacred Sources of National Identity, 0-19-210017-3
- 2004, The Antiquity of Nations, 0-7456-2745-5
- 2008, The Cultural Foundations of Nations: Hierarchy, Covenant and Republic, 1-4051-7798-5
- 2009, Ethno-symbolism and Nationalism: A Cultural Approach, 978-0-415-49798-5

== See also ==
- Etnosymbolism
