= Nationalism in antiquity =

The existence of nationalism in antiquity is a minority opinion amongst scholars of nationalism. Theories on the existence of nationalism in antiquity belong to the primordialist (or perennialist) paradigm. This school of thought differs from modernism, the predominant school of thought, which suggests that it developed largely after the late 18th century and the French Revolution.

== Judeo-Christian roots ==
For many non-modernists, nations have emerged from the Judeo-Christian tradition. John Alexander Armstrong was one of the first modern scholars to argue that nations have pre-modern roots and that their formation was helped by religious institutions locally. However, Armstrong acknowledges "persistent group identity did not ordinarily constitute the overriding legitimisation of polity formation", unlike contemporary nationalism, which presupposes the "right of individuals to [...] establish territorial political structures corresponding to their consciousness of group identity".

Tom Garvin wrote that "something strangely like modern nationalism is documented for many peoples in medieval times and in classical times as well," citing the ancient Jews, the classical Greeks and the Gaulish and British Celts as examples. The Great Jewish Revolt against Roman rule (66–73 CE) is often cited by scholars as a prominent example of ancient Jewish nationalism. Adrian Hastings argued that Jews are the "true proto-nation", that through the model of ancient Israel found in the Hebrew Bible, provided the world with the original concept of nationhood which later influenced Christian nations. Likewise, Steven Grosby designated the Kingdom of Israel a nation, citing a relatively uniform territory, the existence of a common legal structure in that territory and legal distinction drawn between Israelites and others.

Anthony D. Smith wrote that the Jews of the late Second Temple period provide "a closer approximation to the ideal type of the nation [...] than perhaps anywhere else in the ancient world", adding that this observation "must make us wary of pronouncing too readily against the possibility of the nation, and even a form of religious nationalism, before the onset of modernity". Smith traced the formation of a Jewish nation to as early as the 7th century BCE, under kings such as Hezekiah and Josiah, but argued that Jewish nationalism emerged only under the Romans, with the Zealots and during the Bar Kokhba Revolt. He characterized these as "religio-political" uprisings that sought to “restore national autonomy, unity and identity, and rebuild a Jewish state.” Other scholars, such as Doron Mendels, Steven Grosby, and Aviel Roshwald, also argue for the rise of a kind of nationalism among ancient Jews. David M. Goodblatt believes that Jewish nationalism appears in the Second Temple period (5th–1st century BC).

Azar Gat claims a Jewish nation has existed since antiquity and that the creation of imagined communities was made possible not only by secularisation and the rise of print capitalism in modern era, but could also be produced earlier by the spoken word and via religious rituals. Gat does not agree with the modernist view that pre-modern multi-ethnic empires were ruled by an elite indifferent to the ethnic composition of its subjects. In fact, almost all of the empires were based on a dominant ethnic core, while most ethnic communities were too small and weak to have their own independent state.

Ernest Gellner, a leading modernist scholar of nationalism, wrote in his later work Nationalism that "it is possible to seek the origins of nationalism in ancient Israel", where "an inherently unique and potentially universal deity" had "a culturally distinct and exclusive clientele". He contrasted this with the ancient Greeks, whom he described as "cultural chauvinists" who were "acutely aware of their cultural distinctiveness and superiority", but whose chauvinism did not produce "any aspiration to political unification". According to Gellner, Greek political unification was instead "forcibly imposed by the marginally Hellenic Macedonians".

== Criticisms ==
George Vasilev finds scholarly equivalence between Ancient Israel and contemporary nationalism guilty of perpetuating methodological nationalism, naturalising supposedly hereditary governing institutions back to ancient times. Government bureaucracy in antiquity did not "aim to recreate culturally populations in the image of an ethnic or national ideal" and continuity drawn between the past and present by scholars like Grosby and Roshwald, he argues, is "spurious because the ancient and medieval political actors [...] were not functional equivalents of contemporary states". Vasilev continues:

sovereigns did not rule in the name of 'the people', but rather in the name of religion or civilisation. The empires, dynastic kingdoms, city-states and tribal confederacies that went to war did so over the balance of power between them or to bring a desired successor to the throne, but not to achieve ethnic and national aggrandisement.

Meanwhile, Umut Özkırımlı argues Grosby does not demonstrate how the factors he identifies contributed in any way to the formation of a "national" consciousness. He criticises the perennialist view of nations for relying on "elite documents, be it historical chronicles or religious texts, to tell us the story of the nation and tak[ing] the receptiveness of the masses for granted".

== See also ==
- Nationalism
- Nationalism in the Middle Ages
- Nation
- National identity
- Nation building
- Nation state
