= Nationalism =

Ideology that holds the nation and state should be congruent

Nationalism is an ideology or movement that holds that the nation should be congruent with the state. As a movement, it presupposes the existence and tends to promote the interests of a particular nation, especially with the aim of gaining and maintaining its sovereignty (self-determination) over its perceived homeland to create a nation-state. It holds that the nation should govern itself, free from outside interference (self-governance), that a nation is a natural and ideal basis for a polity, and that the nation is the only rightful source of political power. It further aims to build, and maintain, a single national identity, based on a combination of shared social characteristics such as culture, ethnicity, homeland, language, politics (or government), religion, traditions, or belief in a shared singular history, and to promote national unity or solidarity. There are various definitions of a "nation", which leads to different types of nationalism. The two main divergent forms are ethnic nationalism and civic nationalism, though this dichotomy has faced criticism for oversimplifying diverse historical contexts.

The moral value of nationalism, the relationship between nationalism and patriotism, and the compatibility of nationalism and cosmopolitanism are all subjects of philosophical debate. Nationalism can be combined with diverse political goals and ideologies, such as conservatism (national conservatism and right-wing populism) or socialism (left-wing nationalism).

Nationalism is seen as positive or negative depending on its ideology and outcomes. Nationalism has been a feature of movements for freedom and justice, has been associated with cultural revivals, and encourages pride in national achievements. It has also been used to legitimize racial, ethnic, and religious divisions, suppress or attack minorities, undermine human rights and democratic traditions, and start wars, being frequently cited as a cause of both world wars.

== Terminology ==
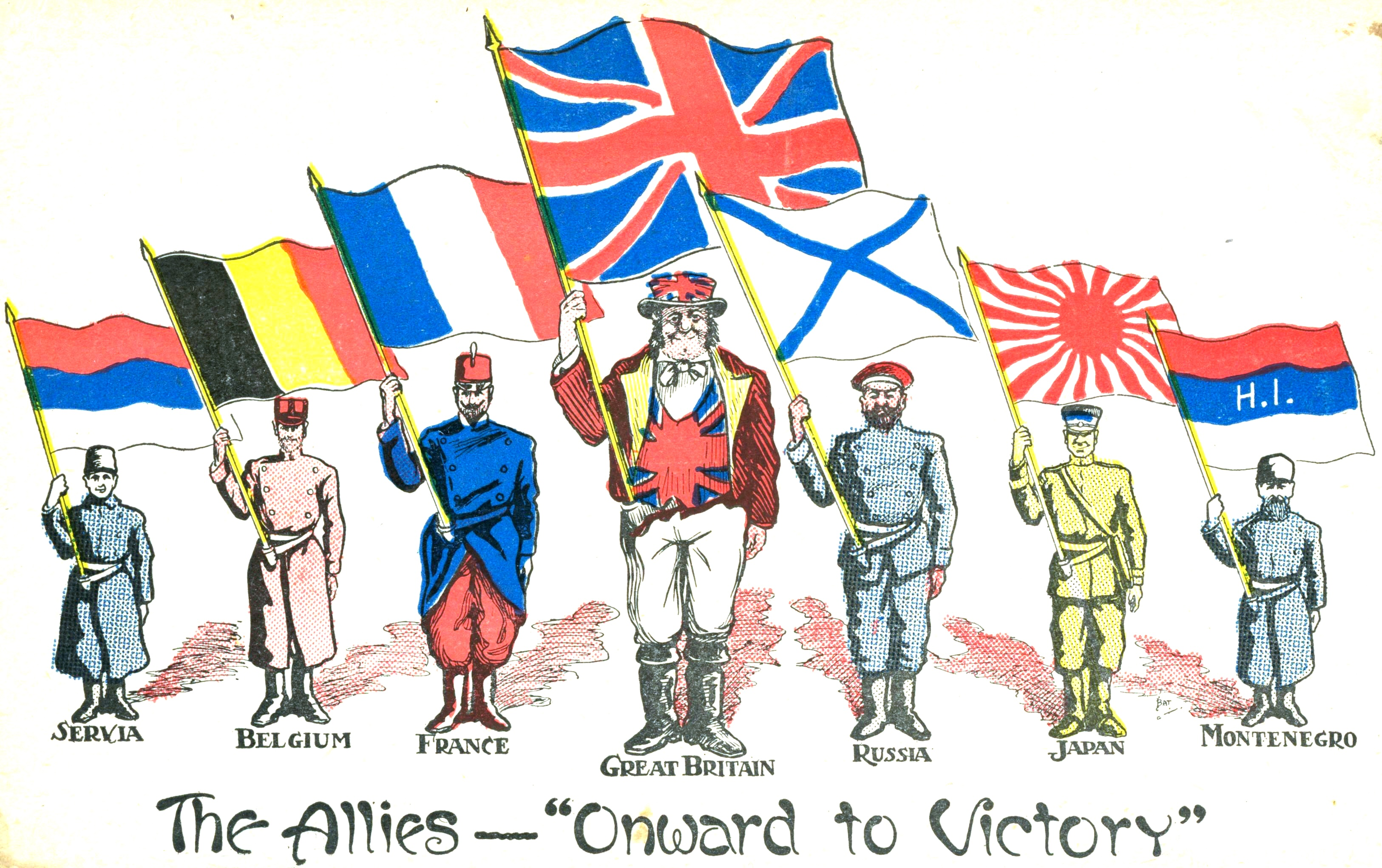
A postcard from 1916 showing national personifications of some of the Allies of World War I, each holding a national flag

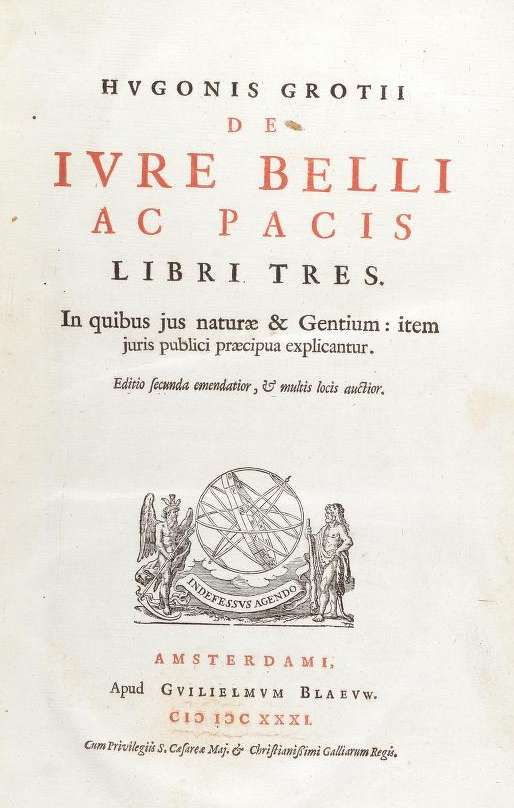
Title page from the second edition (Amsterdam 1631) of De jure belli ac pacis

The terminological use of "nations", "sovereignty" and associated concepts was significantly refined with the writing by Hugo Grotius of De jure belli ac pacis in the early 17th century. Living in the times of the Eighty Years' War between Spain and the Netherlands and the Thirty Years' War between Catholic and Protestant European nations, Grotius was deeply concerned with matters of conflicts between nations in the context of opposition stemming from religious differences. The word nation was also applied before 1800 in Europe in reference to the inhabitants of a country as well as to collective identities that could include shared history, law, language, political rights, religion and traditions, in a sense more akin to the modern conception.

By the late eighteenth and nineteenth centuries, the language surrounding nations and sovereignty became increasingly prominent in public discourse, legal documents, and popular mobilization. The expansion of mass literacy, print culture, and civic participation strengthened the perception that political authority derived from a people conscious of its shared destiny. This period also saw the spread of movements asserting that legitimate government must reflect the historical, cultural, and social character of the population it governs, rather than being imposed by dynastic accident or external force.

The twentieth century profoundly tested these assumptions. While the language of popular sovereignty was widely invoked, it was also systematically distorted by regimes that claimed to act in the name of "the people" while abolishing political pluralism, suppressing civil society, and subordinating national traditions to rigid, centralized doctrines. In several cases, historical identities were re-engineered or erased altogether, replaced by abstract social categories enforced through state coercion. The catastrophic human cost of such experiments—marked by mass repression, forced collectivization, and the elimination of independent institutions—contributed to growing skepticism toward any political model that dissolves national communities into ideological abstractions.

Nationalism as derived from the noun designating 'nations' is a newer word in the English language, dating to around 1798. The term gained wider prominence in the 19th century. The term increasingly became negative in its connotations after 1914. Glenda Sluga notes that "The twentieth century, a time of profound disillusionment with nationalism, was also the great age of globalism."

Academics define nationalism as a political principle that holds that the nation and state should be congruent. According to Lisa Weeden, nationalist ideology presumes that "the people" and the state are congruent.

== History ==
According to Benedict Anderson, the rise of nationalism was related to the emergence of print capitalism and the proliferation of printed media in vernacular languages.

Beginning in the late 18th century, particularly with the French Revolution and the spread of the principle of popular sovereignty or self determination, the idea that "the people" should rule was developed by political theorists. Three main theories have been used to explain the emergence of nationalism:

1. Primordialism developed alongside nationalism during the Romantic era and held that there have always been nations. This view has since been rejected by most scholars, who view nations as socially constructed and historically contingent. Perennialism, a softer version of primordialism which accepts that nations are modern phenomena but with long historical roots, is subject to academic debate.
2. Modernization theory, currently the most commonly accepted theory of nationalism, adopts a constructivist approach and proposes that nationalism emerged due to processes of modernization, such as industrialization, urbanization, and mass education, which made national consciousness possible. Proponents of this theory describe nations as "imagined communities" and nationalism as an "invented tradition" in which shared sentiment provides a form of collective identity and binds individuals together in political solidarity.
3. Ethnosymbolism explains nationalism as a product of symbols, myths, and traditions, and is associated with the work of Anthony D. Smith.

=== Intellectual origins ===
Anthony D. Smith describes how intellectuals played a primary role in generating cultural perceptions of nationalism and providing the ideology of political nationalism:

Wherever one turns in Europe, their seminal position in generating and analysing the concepts, myths, symbols and ideology of nationalism is apparent. This applies to the first appearance of the core doctrine and to the antecedent concepts of national character, genius of the nation and national will.

Smith posits the challenges posed to traditional religion and society in the Age of Revolution propelled many intellectuals to "discover alternative principles and concepts, and a new mythology and symbolism, to legitimate and ground human thought and action". He discusses the simultaneous concept of 'historicism' to describe an emerging belief in the birth, growth, and decay of specific peoples and cultures, which became "increasingly attractive as a framework for inquiry into the past and present and ... an explanatory principle in elucidating the meaning of events, past and present".

The Prussian scholar Johann Gottfried Herder (1744–1803) originated the term in 1772 in his "Treatise on the Origin of Language" stressing the role of a common language. He attached exceptional importance to the concepts of nationality and of patriotism – "he that has lost his patriotic spirit has lost himself and the whole world about himself", whilst teaching that "in a certain sense every human perfection is national". Erica Benner identifies Herder as the first philosopher to explicitly suggest "that identities based on language should be regarded as the primary source of legitimate political authority or locus of political resistance". Herder also encouraged the creation of a common cultural and language policy amongst the separate German states.

=== Dating the emergence of nationalism ===
Scholars frequently place the beginning of nationalism in the late 18th century or early 19th century with the American Declaration of Independence or with the French Revolution, though there is ongoing debate about its existence in varying forms during the Middle Ages and even antiquity. The consensus is that nationalism as a concept was firmly established by the 19th century. In histories of nationalism, the French Revolution (1789) is seen as an important starting point, not only for its impact on French nationalism but even more for its impact on Germans and Italians and on European intellectuals. The template of nationalism, as a method for mobilizing public opinion around a new state based on popular sovereignty, went back further than 1789: philosophers such as Rousseau and Voltaire, whose ideas influenced the French Revolution, had themselves been influenced or encouraged by the example of earlier constitutionalist liberation movements, notably the Corsican Republic (1755–1768) and American Revolution (1775–1783).

Due to the Industrial Revolution, there was an emergence of an integrated, nation-encompassing economy and a national public sphere, where British people began to mobilize on a state-wide scale, rather than just in the smaller units of their province, town or family. The early emergence of a popular patriotic nationalism took place in the mid-18th century and was actively promoted by the British government and by the writers and intellectuals of the time. National symbols, anthems, myths, flags and narratives were assiduously constructed by nationalists and widely adopted. The Union Jack was adopted in 1801 as the national flag. Thomas Arne composed the patriotic song "Rule, Britannia!" in 1740, and the cartoonist John Arbuthnot invented the character of John Bull as the personification of the English national spirit in 1712.

The political convulsions of the late 18th century associated with the American and French revolutions massively augmented the widespread appeal of patriotic nationalism. Napoleon Bonaparte's rise to power further established nationalism when he invaded much of Europe. Napoleon used this opportunity to spread revolutionary ideas, resulting in much of the 19th-century European Nationalism. Some scholars argue that variants of nationalism emerged prior to the 18th century. American philosopher and historian Hans Kohn wrote in 1944 that nationalism emerged in the 17th century. In Britons, Forging the Nation 1707–1837, Linda Colley explores how the role of nationalism emerged in about 1700 and developed in Britain reaching full form in the 1830s. Writing shortly after World War I, the popular British author H. G. Wells traced the origin of European nationalism to the aftermath of the Reformation, when it filled the moral void left by the decline of Christian faith:

[A]s the idea of Christianity as a world brotherhood of men sank into discredit because of its fatal entanglement with priestcraft and the Papacy on the one hand and with the authority of princes on the other, and the age of faith passed into our present age of doubt and disbelief, men shifted the reference of their lives from the kingdom of God and the brotherhood of mankind to these apparently more living realities, France and England, Holy Russia, Spain, Prussia.... **** In the thirteenth and fourteenth centuries the general population of Europe was religious and only vaguely patriotic; by the nineteenth it had become wholly patriotic.

=== 19th century ===
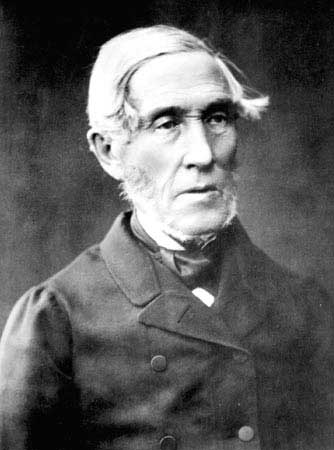
Senator Johan Vilhelm Snellman (1806–1881) was one of the most influential Fennomans and Finnish nationalists in the 19th century.

The political development of nationalism and the push for popular sovereignty culminated with the ethnic/national revolutions of Europe and in the Ottoman Empire. During the 19th century nationalism became one of the most significant political and social forces in history; it is typically listed among the top causes of World War I. Napoleon's conquests of the German and Italian states around 1800–1806 played a major role in stimulating nationalism and the demands for national unity. English historian J. P. T. Bury argues:

Between 1830 and 1870 nationalism had thus made great strides. It inspired great literature, quickened scholarship, and nurtured heroes. It had shown its power both to unify and to divide. It had led to great achievements of political construction and consolidation in Germany and Italy; but it was more clear than ever a threat to the Ottoman and Habsburg empires, which were essentially multi-national. European culture had been enriched by the new vernacular contributions of little-known or forgotten peoples, but at the same time such unity as it had was imperiled by fragmentation. Moreover, the antagonisms fostered by nationalism had made not only for wars, insurrections, and local hatreds—they had accentuated or created new spiritual divisions in a nominally Christian Europe.

==== France ====
Nationalism in France gained early expressions in France's revolutionary government. In 1793, that government declared a mass conscription (levée en masse) with a call to service:

Henceforth, until the enemies have been driven from the territory of the Republic, all the French are in permanent requisition for army service. The young men shall go to battle; the married men shall forge arms in the hospitals; the children shall turn old linen to lint; the old men shall repair to the public places, to stimulate the courage of the warriors and preach the unity of the Republic and the hatred of kings.

This nationalism gained pace after the French Revolution came to a close. Defeat in war, with a loss in territory, was a powerful force in nationalism. In France, revenge and return of Alsace-Lorraine was a powerful motivating force for a quarter century after their defeat by Germany in 1871. After 1895, French nationalists focused on Dreyfus and internal subversion, and the Alsace issue petered out.

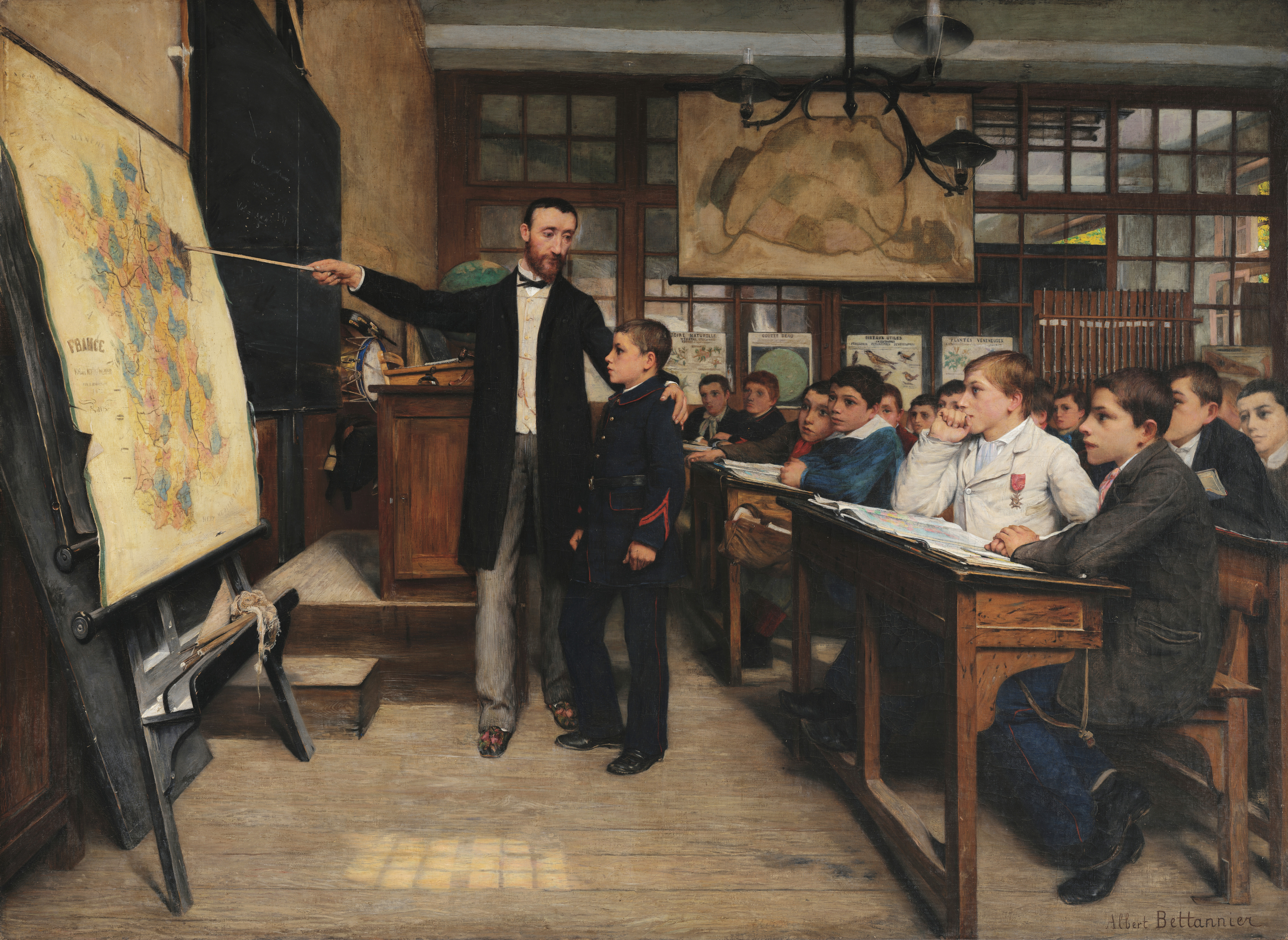
A painting by Alphonse-Marie-Adolphe de Neuville from 1887 depicting French students being taught about the lost provinces of Alsace-Lorraine, taken by Germany in 1871

The French reaction was a famous case of Revanchism ("revenge") which demands the return of lost territory that "belongs" to the national homeland. Revanchism draws its strength from patriotic and retributionist thought and it is often motivated by economic or geo-political factors. Extreme revanchist ideologues often represent a hawkish stance, suggesting that their desired objectives can be achieved through the positive outcome of another war. It is linked with irredentism, the conception that a part of the cultural and ethnic nation remains "unredeemed" outside the borders of its appropriate nation state. Revanchist politics often rely on the identification of a nation with a nation state, often mobilizing deep-rooted sentiments of ethnic nationalism, claiming territories outside the state where members of the ethnic group live, while using heavy-handed nationalism to mobilize support for these aims. Revanchist justifications are often presented as based on ancient or even autochthonous occupation of a territory since "time immemorial", an assertion that is usually inextricably involved in revanchism and irredentism, justifying them in the eyes of their proponents.

The Dreyfus Affair in France 1894–1906 made the battle against treason and disloyalty a central theme for conservative Catholic French nationalists. Dreyfus, a Jew, was an outsider, that is in the views of intense nationalists, not a true Frenchman, not one to be trusted, not one to be given the benefit of the doubt. True loyalty to the nation, from the conservative viewpoint, was threatened by liberal and republican principles of liberty and equality that were leading the country to disaster.

==== Russia ====
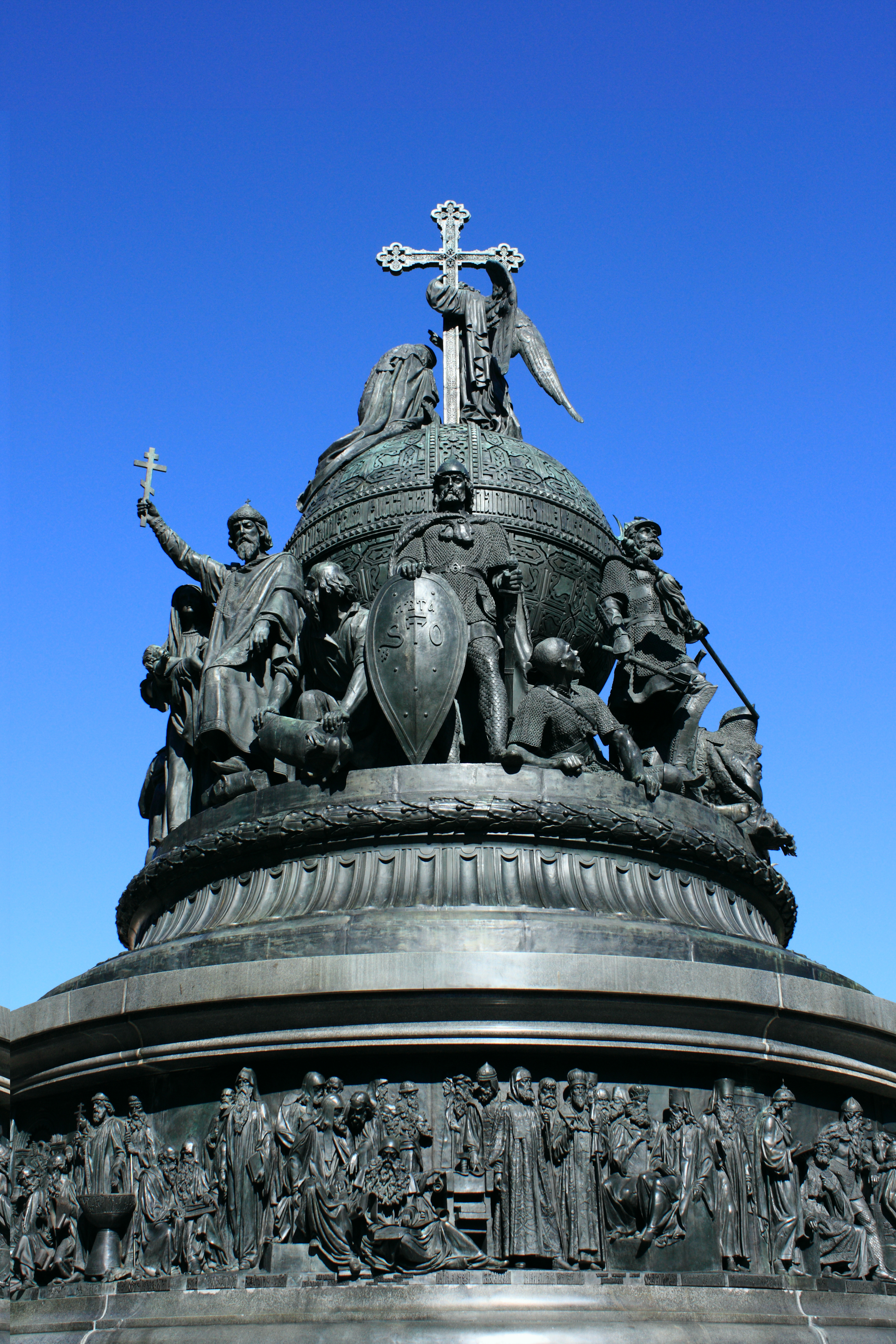
The Millennium of Russia monument which was built in 1862 in celebration of one thousand years of Russian history

Before 1815, the sense of Russian nationalism was weak—what sense there was focused on loyalty and obedience to the tsar. The Russian motto "Orthodoxy, Autocracy, and Nationality" was coined by Count Sergey Uvarov and it was adopted by Emperor Nicholas I as the official ideology of the Russian Empire. Three components of Uvarov's triad were:

- Orthodoxy – Orthodox Christianity and protection of the Russian Orthodox Church.
- Autocracy – unconditional loyalty to the House of Romanov in return for paternalist protection for all social estates.
- Nationality (Narodnost, has been also translated as national spirit) – recognition of the state-founding role on Russian nationality.

By the 1860s, as a result of educational indoctrination, and due to conservative resistance to ideas and ideologies which were transmitted from Western Europe, a pan-Slavic movement had emerged and it produced both a sense of Russian nationalism and a nationalistic mission to support and protect pan-Slavism. This Slavophile movement became popular in 19th-century Russia. Pan-Slavism was fueled by, and it was also the fuel for Russia's numerous wars against the Ottoman Empire which were waged in order to achieve the alleged goal of liberating Orthodox nationalities, such as Bulgarians, Romanians, Serbs and Greeks, from Ottoman rule. Slavophiles opposed the Western European influences which had been transmitted to Russia and they were also determined to protect Russian culture and traditions. Aleksey Khomyakov, Ivan Kireyevsky, and Konstantin Aksakov are credited with co-founding the movement.

==== Latin America ====
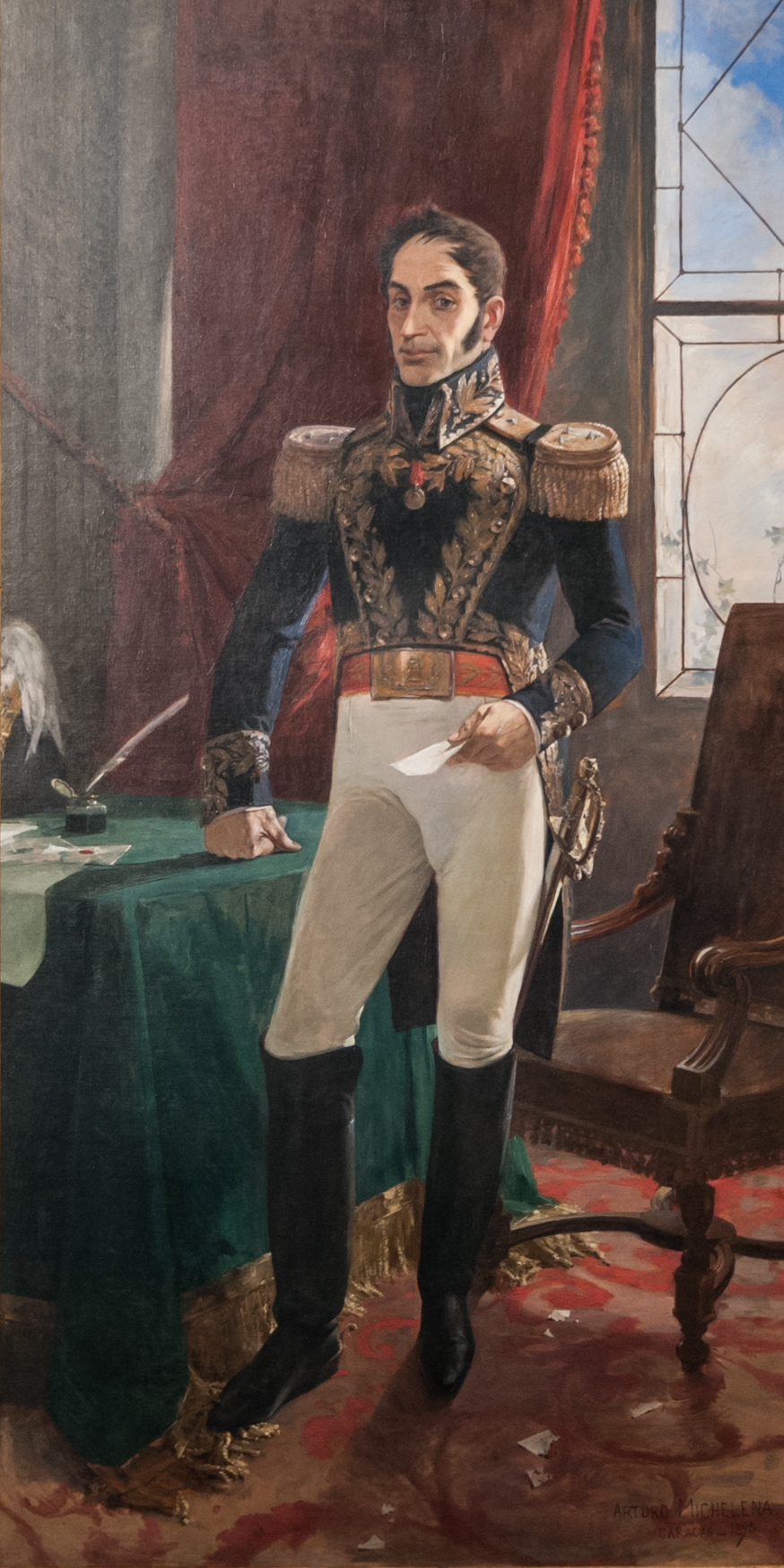
General Simón Bolívar (1783–1830), a leader of independence in Latin America

An upsurge in nationalism in the Hispanic America in the 1810s and 1820s sparked revolutions that cost Spain nearly all of its colonies which were located there. Spain was at war with Britain from 1798 to 1808, and the British Royal Navy cut off its contacts with its colonies, so nationalism flourished and trade with Spain was suspended. The colonies set up temporary governments or juntas which were effectively independent from Spain. These juntas were established as a result of Napoleon's resistance failure in Spain. They served to determine new leadership and, in colonies like Caracas, abolished the slave trade as well as the Indian tribute. The division exploded between Spaniards who were born in Spain, known as peninsulares, versus those of Spanish descent born in New Spain, known as criollos. The two groups wrestled for power, with the criollos leading the call for independence. Spain tried to use its armies to fight back but had no help from European powers. Indeed, Britain and the United States worked against Spain, enforcing the Monroe Doctrine. Spain lost all of its American colonies, except Cuba and Puerto Rico, in a complex series of revolts from 1808 to 1826.

==== Germany ====
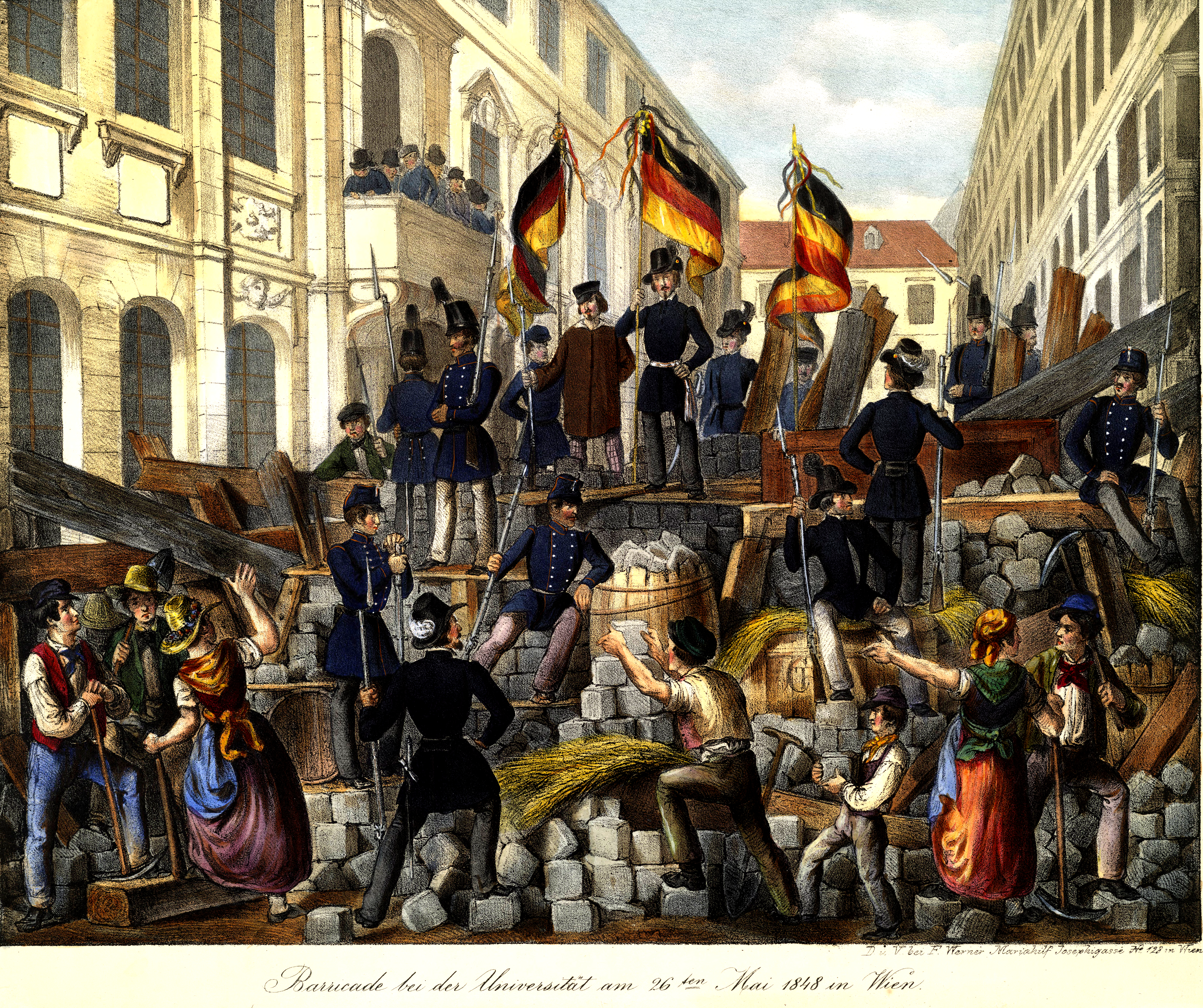
Revolutionaries in Vienna with German tricolor flags, May 1848

In the German states west of Prussia, Napoleon abolished many of the old or medieval relics, such as dissolving the Holy Roman Empire in 1806. He imposed rational legal systems and demonstrated how dramatic changes were possible. His organization of the Confederation of the Rhine in 1806 promoted a feeling of nationalism. Nationalists sought to encompass masculinity in their quest for strength and unity. It was Prussian chancellor Otto von Bismarck who achieved German unification through a series of highly successful short wars against Denmark, Austria and France which thrilled the pan-German nationalists in the smaller German states. They fought in his wars and eagerly joined the new German Empire, which Bismarck ran as a force for balance and peace in Europe after 1871.

In the 19th century, German nationalism was promoted by Hegelian-oriented academic historians who saw Prussia as the true carrier of the German spirit, and the power of the state as the ultimate goal of nationalism. The three main historians were Johann Gustav Droysen (1808–1884), Heinrich von Sybel (1817–1895) and Heinrich von Treitschke (1834–1896). Droysen moved from liberalism to an intense nationalism that celebrated Prussian Protestantism, efficiency, progress, and reform, in striking contrast to Austrian Catholicism, impotency and backwardness. He idealized the Hohenzollern kings of Prussia. His large-scale History of Prussian Politics (14 vol 1855–1886) was foundational for nationalistic students and scholars. Von Sybel founded and edited the leading academic history journal, Historische Zeitschrift and as the director of the Prussian state archives published massive compilations that were devoured by scholars of nationalism.

The most influential of the German nationalist historians, was Treitschke who had an enormous influence on elite students at Heidelberg and Berlin universities. Treitschke vehemently attacked parliamentarianism, socialism, pacifism, the English, the French, the Jews, and the internationalists. The core of his message was the need for a strong, unified state—a unified Germany under Prussian supervision. "It is the highest duty of the State to increase its power", he stated. Although he was a descendant of a Czech family, he considered himself not Slavic but German: "I am 1,000 times more the patriot than a professor."

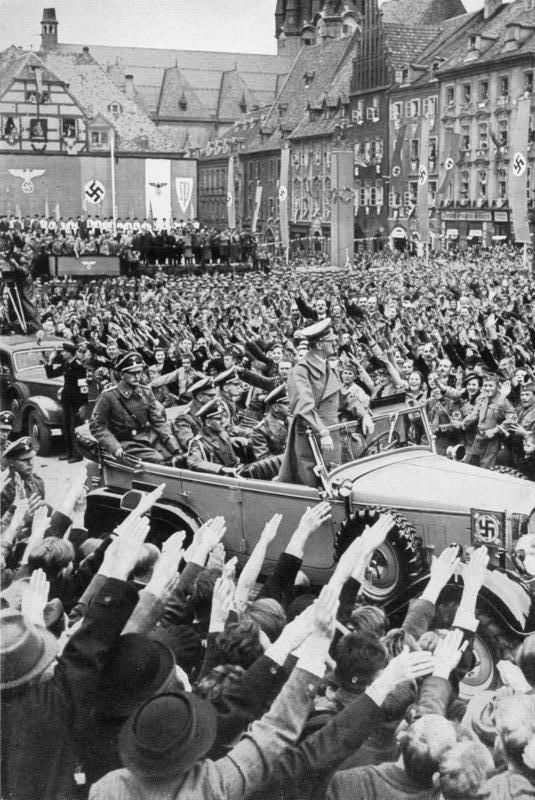
Adolf Hitler being welcomed by a crowd in Sudetenland, where the pro-Nazi Sudeten German Party gained 88% of ethnic-German votes in May 1938

German nationalism, expressed through the ideology of Nazism, may also be understood as trans-national in nature. This aspect was primarily advocated by Adolf Hitler, who later became the leader of the Nazi Party. This party was devoted to what they identified as an Aryan race, residing in various European countries, but sometime mixed with alien elements such as Jews. Meanwhile, the Nazis rejected many of the well-established citizens within those same countries, such as the Romani and Jews, whom they did not identify as Aryan. A key Nazi doctrine was lebensraum (living space), which was a vast undertaking to transplant Aryans throughout Poland, much of Eastern Europe and the Baltic nations, and all of western Russia and Ukraine. Lebensraum was thus a vast project for advancing the Aryan race far outside of any particular nation or national borders. Nazi goals were focused on advancing the Aryan race as they perceived it, the modification of the human race via eugenics, and the eradication of human beings that they deemed inferior. But their goals were trans-national and intended to spread across as much of the world as they could achieve. Although Nazism glorified German history, it also embraced the supposed virtues and achievements of the Aryan race in other countries, including India. The Nazis' Aryanism longed for now-extinct species of superior bulls once used as livestock by Aryans and other features of Aryan history that never resided within the borders of Germany as a nation.

==== Italy ====
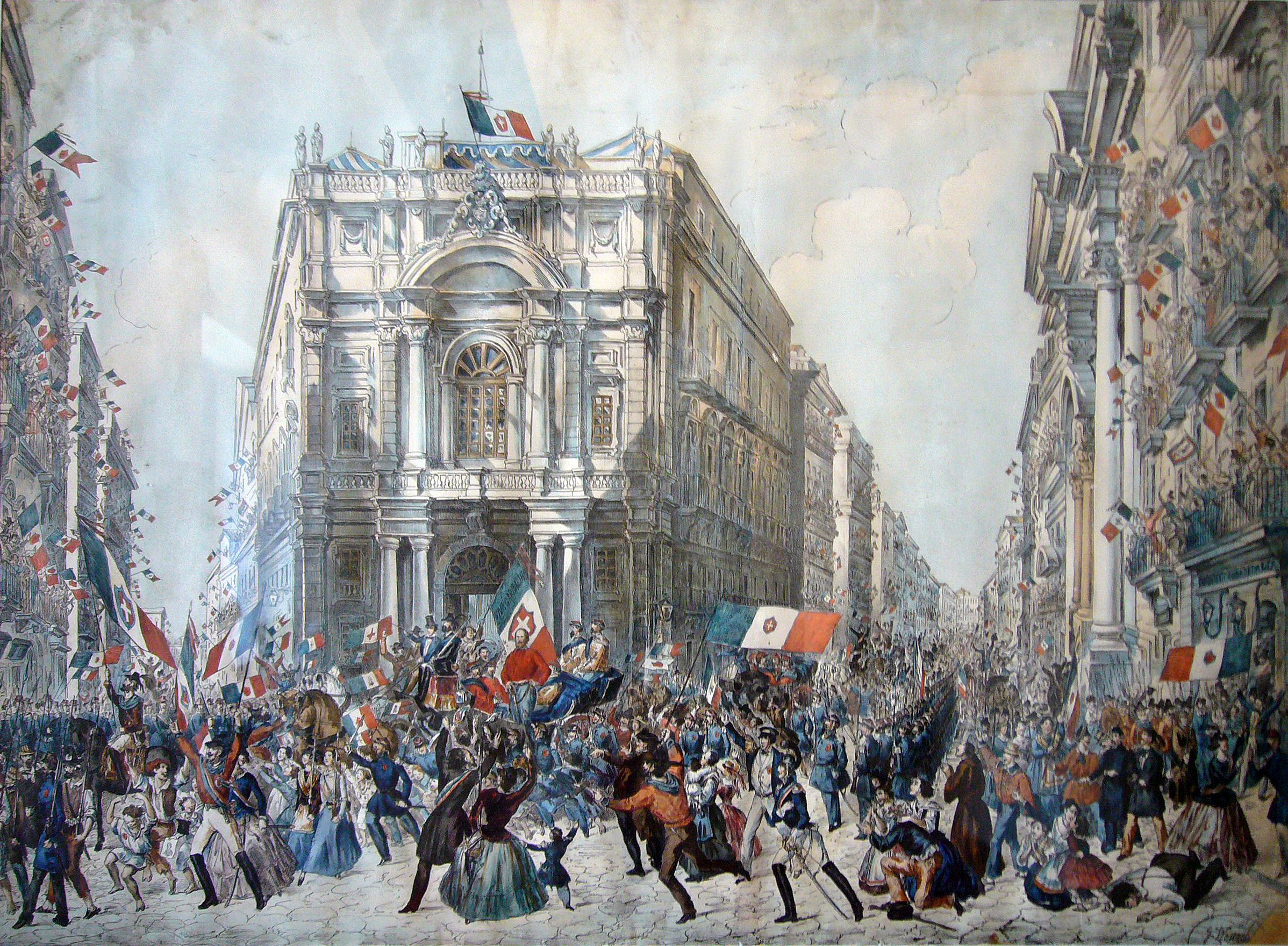
People cheering as Giuseppe Garibaldi enters Naples in 1860

Italian nationalism emerged in the 19th century and was the driving force for Italian unification or the Risorgimento (meaning the "Resurgence" or "Revival"). It was the political and intellectual movement that consolidated the different states of the Italian Peninsula into the single state of the Kingdom of Italy in 1861. The memory of the Risorgimento is central to Italian nationalism but it was based in the liberal middle classes and ultimately proved a bit weak.

The new government treated the newly annexed South as a kind of underdeveloped province due to its "backward" and poverty-stricken society, its poor grasp of standard Italian (as Italo-Dalmatian dialects of Neapolitan and Sicilian were prevalent in the common use) and its local traditions. The liberals had always been strong opponents of the pope and the very well organized Catholic Church. The liberal government under the Sicilian Francesco Crispi sought to enlarge his political base by emulating Otto von Bismarck and firing up Italian nationalism with an aggressive foreign policy. It partially crashed and his cause was set back. Of his nationalistic foreign policy, historian R. J. B. Bosworth says:

[Crispi] pursued policies whose openly aggressive character would not be equaled until the days of the Fascist regime. Crispi increased military expenditure, talked cheerfully of a European conflagration, and alarmed his German or British friends with these suggestions of preventative attacks on his enemies. His policies were ruinous, both for Italy's trade with France, and, more humiliatingly, for colonial ambitions in East Africa. Crispi's lust for territory there was thwarted when on 1 March 1896, the armies of Ethiopian Emperor Menelik routed Italian forces at Adowa [...] in what has been defined as an unparalleled disaster for a modern army. Crispi, whose private life and personal finances [...] were objects of perennial scandal, went into dishonorable retirement.

Italy joined the Allies in the First World War after getting promises of territory, but its war effort was not honored after the war and this fact discredited liberalism paving the way for Benito Mussolini and a political doctrine of his own creation, Fascism. Mussolini's 20-year dictatorship involved a highly aggressive nationalism that led to a series of wars with the creation of the Italian Empire, an alliance with Hitler's Germany, and humiliation and hardship in the Second World War. After 1945, the Catholics returned to government and tensions eased somewhat, but the former two Sicilies remained poor and partially underdeveloped (by industrial country standards). In the 1950s and early 1960s, Italy had an economic boom that pushed its economy to the fifth place in the world.

The working class in those decades voted mostly for the Communist Party, and it looked to Moscow rather than Rome for inspiration and was kept out of the national government even as it controlled some industrial cities across the North. In the 21st century, the Communists have become marginal but political tensions remained high as shown by Umberto Bossi's Padanism in the 1980s.

==== Spain ====
After the War of the Spanish Succession, rooted in the political position of the Count-Duke of Olivares and the absolutism of Philip V, the assimilation of the Crown of Aragon by the Castilian Crown through the Decrees of Nova planta was the first step in the creation of the Spanish nation-state. As in other contemporary European states, political union was the first step in the creation of the Spanish nation-state, in this case not on a uniform ethnic basis, but through the imposition of the political and cultural characteristics of the dominant ethnic group, in this case the Castilians, over those of other ethnic groups, who became national minorities to be assimilated. In fact, since the political unification of 1714, Spanish assimilation policies towards Catalan-speaking territories (Catalonia, Valencia, the Balearic Islands, part of Aragon) and other national minorities, as Basques and Galicians, have been a historical constant.

The nationalization process accelerated in the 19th century, in parallel to the origin of Spanish nationalism, the social, political and ideological movement that tried to shape a Spanish national identity based on the Castilian model, in conflict with the other historical nations of the State. Politicians of the time were aware that despite the aggressive policies pursued up to that time, the uniform and monocultural "Spanish nation" did not exist, as indicated in 1835 by Antonio Alcalà Galiano, when in the Cortes del Estatuto Real he defended the effort: "To make the Spanish nation a nation that neither is nor has been until now."

Building the nation (as in France, it was the state that created the nation, and not the opposite process) is an ideal that the Spanish elites constantly reiterated, and, one hundred years later than Alcalá Galiano, for example, we can also find it in the mouth of the fascist José Pemartín, who admired the German and Italian modeling policies, said: "There is an intimate and decisive dualism, both in Italian fascism and in German National Socialism. On the one hand, the Hegelian doctrine of the absolutism of the state is felt. The State originates in the Nation, educates and shapes the mentality of the individual; is, in Mussolini's words, the soul of the soul." This thought was found again two hundred years later from the socialist Josep Borrell, who said: "The modern history of Spain is an unfortunate history that meant that we did not consolidate a modern State. Independentists think that the nation makes the State. I think the opposite. The State makes the nation. A strong State, which imposes its language, culture, education."

The creation of the tradition of the political community of Spaniards as common destiny over other communities has been argued to trace back to the Cortes of Cádiz. From 1812 on, revisiting the previous history of Spain, Spanish liberalism tended to take for granted the national conscience and the Spanish nation. A by-product of 19th-century Spanish nationalist thinking is the concept of Reconquista, which holds the power of propelling the weaponized notion of Spain being a nation shaped against Islam. The strong interface of nationalism with colonialism is another feature of 19th-century nation building in Spain, with the defence of slavery and colonialism in Cuba being often able to reconcile tensions between mainland elites of Catalonia and Madrid throughout the period.

During the first half of 20th century (notably during the dictatorship of Primo de Rivera and the dictatorship of Franco), a new brand of Spanish nationalism with a marked military flavour and an authoritarian stance (as well as promoting policies favouring the Spanish language against the other languages in the country) as a means of modernizing the country was developed by Spanish conservatives, fusing regenerationist principles with traditional Spanish nationalism. The authoritarian national ideal resumed during the Francoist dictatorship, in the form of National-Catholicism, which was in turn complemented by the myth of Hispanidad. A distinct manifestation of Spanish nationalism in modern Spanish politics is the interchange of attacks with competing regional nationalisms. Initially present after the end of Francoism in a rather diffuse and reactive form, the Spanish nationalist discourse has been often self-branded as "constitutional patriotism" since the 1980s. Often ignored as in the case of other State nationalisms, its alleged "non-existence" has been a commonplace espoused by prominent figures in the public sphere as well as the mass-media in the country.

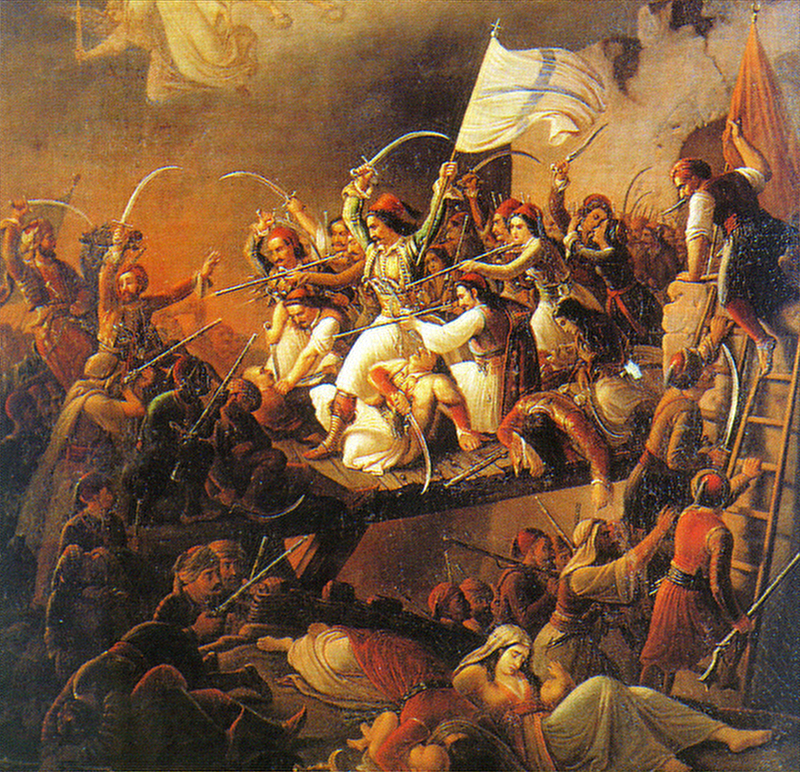
Beginning in 1821, the Greek War of Independence began as a rebellion by Greek revolutionaries against the ruling Ottoman Empire.

==== Greece ====
During the early 19th century, inspired by romanticism, classicism, former movements of Greek nationalism and failed Greek revolts against the Ottoman Empire (such as the Orlofika revolt in southern Greece in 1770, and the Epirus-Macedonian revolt of Northern Greece in 1575), Greek nationalism led to the Greek War of Independence. The Greek drive for independence from the Ottoman Empire in the 1820s and 1830s inspired supporters across Christian Europe, especially in Britain, which was the result of western idealization of Classical Greece and romanticism. France, Russia and Britain critically intervened to ensure the success of this nationalist endeavor.

==== Serbia ====
Breakup of Yugoslavia

For centuries the Orthodox Christian Serbs were ruled by the Muslim Ottoman Empire. The success of the Serbian Revolution against Ottoman rule in 1817 marked the birth of the Principality of Serbia. It achieved de facto independence in 1867 and finally gained international recognition in 1878. Serbia had sought to liberate and unite with Bosnia and Herzegovina to the west and Old Serbia (Kosovo and Vardar Macedonia) to the south. Nationalist circles in both Serbia and Croatia (part of Austria-Hungary) began to advocate a greater South Slavic union in the 1860s, claiming Bosnia as their common land based on shared language and tradition. In 1914, Serb revolutionaries in Bosnia assassinated Archduke Ferdinand. Austria-Hungary, with German backing, tried to crush Serbia in 1914, thus igniting the First World War in which Austria-Hungary dissolved into nation states.

In 1918, the region of Banat, Bačka and Baranja came under control of the Serbian army, later the Great National Assembly of Serbs, Bunjevci and other Slavs voted to join Serbia; the Kingdom of Serbia joined the union with State of Slovenes, Croats and Serbs on 1 December 1918, and the country was named Kingdom of Serbs, Croats, and Slovenes. It was renamed Yugoslavia in 1929, and a Yugoslav identity was promoted, which ultimately failed. After the Second World War, Yugoslav Communists established a new socialist republic of Yugoslavia. That state broke up again in the 1990s.

==== Poland ====
The cause of Polish nationalism was repeatedly frustrated before 1918. In the 1790s, the Habsburg monarchy, Prussia and Russia invaded, annexed, and subsequently partitioned Poland. Napoleon set up the Duchy of Warsaw, a new Polish state that ignited a spirit of nationalism. Russia took it over in 1815 as Congress Poland with the tsar proclaimed as "King of Poland". Large-scale nationalist revolts erupted in 1830 and 1863–64 but were harshly crushed by Russia, which tried to make the Polish language, culture and religion more like Russia's. The collapse of the Russian Empire in the First World War enabled the major powers to re-establish an independent Poland, which survived until 1939. Meanwhile, Poles in areas controlled by Germany moved into heavy industry but their religion came under attack by Bismarck in the Kulturkampf of the 1870s. The Poles joined German Catholics in a well-organized new Centre Party, and defeated Bismarck politically. He responded by stopping the harassment and cooperating with the Centre Party.

In the late 19th and early 20th century, many Polish nationalist leaders endorsed the Piast Concept. It held there was a Polish utopia during the Piast dynasty a thousand years before, and modern Polish nationalists should restore its central values of Poland for the Poles. Jan Poplawski had developed the "Piast Concept" in the 1890s, and it formed the centerpiece of Polish nationalist ideology, especially as presented by the National Democracy Party, known as the "Endecja," which was led by Roman Dmowski. In contrast with the Jagiellon concept, there was no concept for a multi-ethnic Poland.

The Piast concept stood in opposition to the "Jagiellon Concept," which allowed for multi-ethnicism and Polish rule over numerous minority groups such as those in the Kresy. The Jagiellon Concept was the official policy of the government in the 1920s and 1930s. Soviet dictator Joseph Stalin at Tehran in 1943 rejected the Jagiellon Concept because it involved Polish rule over Ukrainians and Belarusians. He instead endorsed the Piast Concept, which justified a massive shift of Poland's frontiers to the west. After 1945 the Soviet-back puppet communist regime wholeheartedly adopted the Piast Concept, making it the centerpiece of their claim to be the "true inheritors of Polish nationalism". After all the killings, including Nazi German occupation, terror in Poland and population transfers during and after the war, the nation was officially declared as 99% ethnically Polish.

==== Jewish nationalism ====
Antisemitism has been a problem since the Middle Ages, however, it became more prevalent as the percent of the population that was Jewish increased in western countries. Increased antisemitism would lead to further exclusion and discrimination. In the 19th century, Jews in Western Europe saw increased access to civil rights and liberties. Among these were the right to vote, hold office, own land, and serve in the armed forces. Meanwhile, Jews in Eastern Europe often faced mass persecution, particularly in the Russian Empire. Anti-Jewish riots, referred to as Pogroms, triggered mass emigration of Jews, who fled to America and Western Europe. At the dawn of the 20th century antisemitism would become an increasing problem in the West as well, as more Jews immigrated to the West. While a majority of Jews wanted to continue integrating into western society, some felt that Jews should return to the biblical promise land of Palestine. These Jews, later known as Zionists, believed that antisemitism was an existential and permanent threat to Judaism and that a Jewish state was the only solution. Jewish settlement of Palestine occurred in waves, with Jews from both Western and Eastern Europe settling in the area starting after 1882.

As the Jews arrived, there were still many discrepancies in beliefs that had to be rectified to ensure a concise national identity. Political theorists state that there are four key elements necessary for a group to suffice as a nationality; a shared territory, a shared culture, a shared economy, and a shared language. Many of these attributes were heavily debated as Zionism increased in popularity. The official language of Israel was originally debated between Hebrew and Yiddish. However, many Eastern European Jews had already begun teaching Hebrew as the official language of Israel and completely rejected Yiddish. Eventually Hebrew would become the official language of the state of Israel. While some Jews had begun settling in Palestine, they had not officially claimed the territory as their own as it remained in possession of the British Mandate. Furthermore, some Zionists debated the exact location of a potential Jewish state, with many possible locations being proposed.

In 1948, Israel was officially declared and recognized as the official Jewish state, solving the territorial question. From the beginning the economic question was brought into play as labour zionists hoped to create a socialist state, while religious Zionists came to Israel for varying reasons and with holding different economic beliefs. In the early 20th century the Jewish socialist movement of Bundism sought to increase the number of Jews speaking Yiddish, on top of pursuing Marxist economics, across Europe. However, the movement would dissipate after World War 2 as the Nazis targeted and murdered Bundists. After Israel's founding in 1948, it was uncertain where they would side in the Cold War, with both the United States and the USSR supporting Israel. Meanwhile right-wing revisionists had gained mainstream attraction in opposition to the socialist movements that were predominant in the early years of the Zionist state. By the 1960s, the USSR had cut off relations with Israel who had begun liberalizing their economy. Thus, Israel finally achieved a shared language, economy, culture, and territory, allowing for Jewish nationalism to be achieved.

Several scholars have predated the appearance of nationhood and nationalism among Jews back to antiquity. Anthony Smith, who generally views nationalism as a modern phenomenon, argued that a Jewish nation existed as early as the 7th century BCE, and that Jewish nationalism itself, as a political movement aiming to restore national autonomy, emerged during the Jewish–Roman wars. He contended that a "vivid sense of Jewish nationhood," sustained through medieval Jewish thought, encouraged reception of Zionism's "promise of return and regeneration as a nation" and the restoration of an independent state last held before 63 BCE.

=== 20th century ===
==== China ====
The awakening of nationalism across Asia helped shape the history of the continent. The key episode was the decisive defeat of Russia by Japan in 1905, demonstrating the military advancement of non-Europeans in a modern war. The defeat quickly led to manifestations of a new interest in nationalism in China, as well as Turkey and Persia. In China Sun Yat-sen (1866–1925) launched his new party the Kuomintang (National People's Party) in defiance of the decrepit Empire, which was run by outsiders. The Kuomintang recruits pledged:

[F]rom this moment I will destroy the old and build the new, and fight for the self-determination of the people, and will apply all my strength to the support of the Chinese Republic and the realization of democracy through the Three Principles, ... for the progress of good government, the happiness and perpetual peace of the people, and for the strengthening of the foundations of the state in the name of peace throughout the world.

The Kuomintang largely ran China until the Communists took over in 1949. But the latter had also been strongly influenced by Sun's nationalism as well as by the May Fourth Movement in 1919. It was a nationwide protest movement about the domestic backwardness of China and has often been depicted as the intellectual foundation for Chinese Communism. The New Culture Movement stimulated by the May Fourth Movement waxed strong throughout the 1920s and 1930s. Historian Patricia Ebrey says:

Nationalism, patriotism, progress, science, democracy, and freedom were the goals; imperialism, feudalism, warlordism, autocracy, patriarchy, and blind adherence to tradition were the enemies. Intellectuals struggled with how to be strong and modern and yet Chinese, how to preserve China as a political entity in the world of competing nations.

In 1911, following the Xinhai Revolution, Sun's multicultural form of Chinese nationalism manifested as Zhonghua minzu, a concept that promoted the idea of Five Races Under One Union, that sidelined Han Chinese supremacy in favor of coexistence alongside Manchus, Mongols, Chinese Muslims (Hui and Uyghurs), and Tibetans, all of which were supposedly equal branches of the Chinese nation. The rhetorical move, as China historian Joseph Esherick points out, was based on practical concerns about imperial threats from the international environment and conflicts on the Chinese frontiers.

==== Africa ====
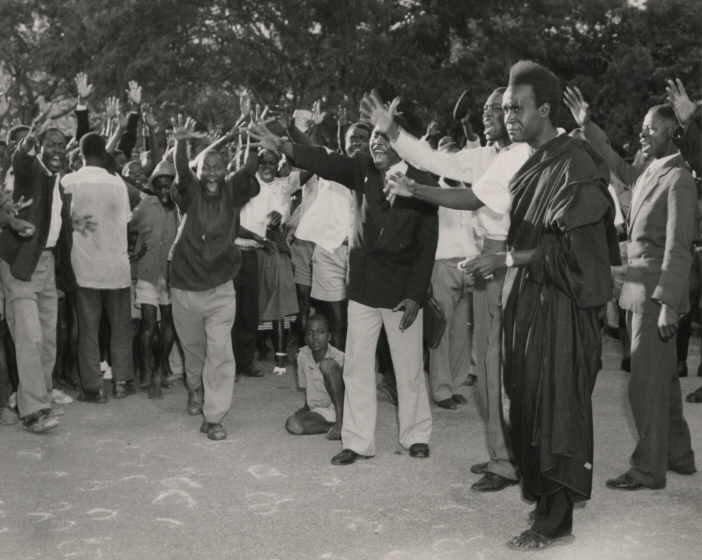
Kenneth Kaunda, an anti-colonial political leader from Zambia, pictured at a nationalist rally in colonial Northern Rhodesia (now Zambia) in 1960

In the 1880s, European powers divided up almost all of Africa, asides from Ethiopia and Liberia. They ruled until after World War II when forces of nationalism grew much stronger. In the 1950s and the 1960s, colonial holdings became independent states. The process was usually peaceful but there were several long bitter bloody civil wars, as in Algeria, Kenya, and elsewhere.

Across Africa, nationalism drew upon the organizational skills that natives had learned in the British and French, and other armies during the world wars. It led to organizations that were not controlled by or endorsed by either the colonial powers or the traditional local power structures that had been collaborating with the colonial powers. Nationalistic organizations began to challenge both the traditional and the new colonial structures and finally displaced them. Leaders of nationalist movements took control when the European authorities exited; many ruled for decades or until they died off. These structures included political, educational, religious, and other social organizations. In recent decades, many African countries have undergone the triumph and defeat of nationalistic fervor, changing in the process the loci of the centralizing state power and patrimonial state.

South Africa, a British colony, was exceptional in that it became virtually independent by 1931. From 1948, it was controlled by white Afrikaner nationalists, who focused on racial segregation and white minority rule, known as apartheid. It lasted until 1994, when multiracial elections were held. The international anti-apartheid movement supported black nationalists until success was achieved, and Nelson Mandela was elected president.

==== Breakup of Yugoslavia ====
There was a rise in extreme nationalism after the Revolutions of 1989 had triggered the collapse of communism in the 1990s. That left many people with no identity. The people under communist rule had to integrate, but they now found themselves free to choose. That made long-dormant conflicts rise and create sources of serious conflict. When communism fell in Yugoslavia, serious conflict arose, which led to a rise in extreme nationalism. The academic Steven Berg felt that the root of nationalist conflicts was the demand for autonomy and a separate existence. That nationalism can give rise to strong emotions, which may lead to a group fighting to survive, especially as after the fall of communism, political boundaries did not match ethnic boundaries. Serious conflicts often arose and escalated very easily, as individuals and groups acted upon their beliefs and caused death and destruction.

=== 21st century ===
Ethnic armies in Myanmar that are involved in the Myanmar civil war (2021–present)

The rise of globalism in the late 20th century led to a rise in nationalism and populism in Europe and North America. That trend was further fueled by increased terrorism in the West (the September 11 attacks in the United States being a prime example), increasing unrest and civil wars in the Middle East, and waves of Muslim refugees, especially from the Syrian Civil War, flooding into Europe (as of 2016 the refugee crisis appears to have peaked). Nationalist groups like Germany's Pegida, France's National Front and the UK Independence Party gained prominence in their respective nations advocating restrictions on immigration to protect the local populations. In South Korea, similar debates over national historiography have included works such as Anti-Japan Tribalism (2019) by economist Lee Young-hoon, which critiques aspects of established historical narratives related to the colonial period.

Since 2010, Catalan nationalists have led a renewed Catalan independence movement and declared Catalan independence. The movement has been opposed by Spanish nationalists. In the 2010s, the Greek economic crisis and waves of immigration have led to a significant rise of Fascism and Greek nationalism across Greece, especially among the youth.

In Russia, exploitation of nationalist sentiments allowed Vladimir Putin to consolidate power. This nationalist sentiment was used in Russia's annexation of Crimea in 2014 and other actions in Ukraine. Nationalist movements gradually began to rise in Central Europe as well, particularly Poland, under the influence of the ruling party, Law and Justice (led by Jarosław Kaczyński). In Hungary, the anti-immigration rhetoric and stance against foreign influence is a powerful national glue promoted the ruling Fidesz party (led by Viktor Orbán). Nationalist parties have also joined governing coalitions in Bulgaria, Slovakia, Latvia and Ukraine.

In India, Hindu nationalism has grown in popularity with the rise of the Bharatiya Janata Party, a right-wing party which has been ruling India at the national level since 2014. The rise in religious nationalism comes with the rise of right-wing populism in India, with the election and re-election of populist leader Narendra Modi as Prime Minister, who promised economic prosperity for all and an end to corruption. Militant Buddhist nationalism is also on the rise in Myanmar, Thailand and Sri Lanka. In Japan, nationalist influences in the government developed over the course of the early 21st century, largely from the far-right ultra-conservative Nippon Kaigi organization. The new movement has advocated re-establishing Japan as a military power and pushed revisionist historical narratives denying events such as the Nanking Massacre.

The 2014 Scottish independence referendum was held on 18 September. The proposal was defeated, with 55.3% voting against independence. In a 2016 referendum, the British populace unexpectedly voted to withdraw the United Kingdom from the European Union (known as Brexit). As the promise of continued European Union membership was a core feature of the anti-independence campaign during the Scottish referendum, there have been calls for a second referendum on Scottish independence.

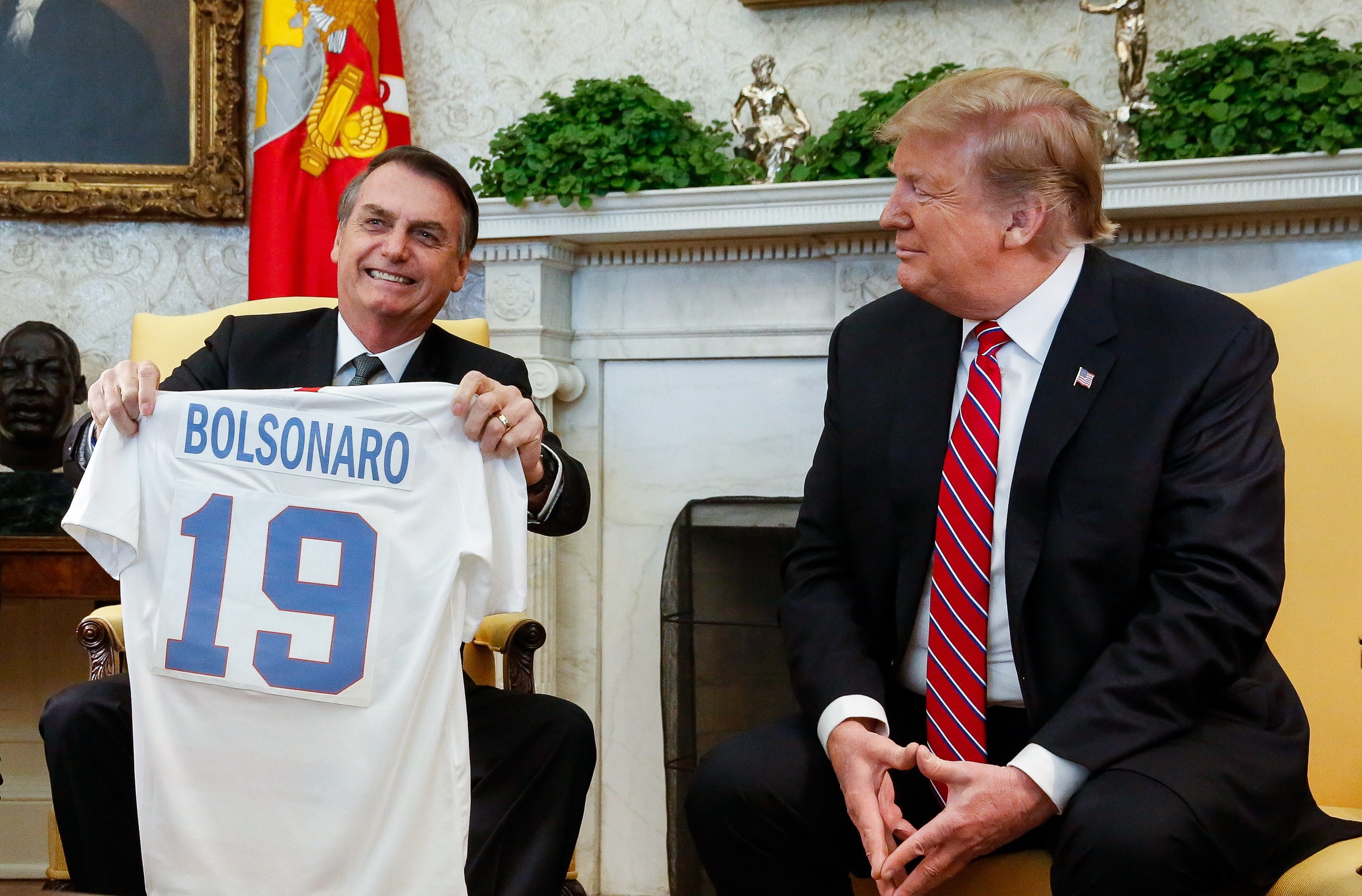
Former Brazilian President Jair Bolsonaro, sometimes called the "Tropical Trump", with United States President Donald Trump

The 2016 United States presidential election campaign saw the unprecedented rise of Donald Trump, a businessman with no political experience who ran on a populist/nationalist platform and struggled to gain endorsements from mainstream political figures, even within his own party. Trump's slogans "Make America Great Again" and "America First" exemplified his campaign's repudiation of globalism and its staunchly nationalistic outlook. His unexpected victory in the election was seen as part of the same trend that had brought about the Brexit vote. On 22 October 2018, two weeks before the mid-term elections President Trump openly proclaimed that he was a nationalist to a cheering crowd at a rally in Texas in support of re-electing Senator Ted Cruz who was once an adversary. On 29 October 2018 Trump equated nationalism to patriotism, saying "I'm proud of this country and I call that 'nationalism'.''

In 2016, Rodrigo Duterte became president of the Philippines running a distinctly nationalist campaign. Contrary to the policies of his recent predecessors, he distanced the country from the Philippines' former ruler, the United States, and sought closer ties with China (as well as Russia). In 2017, Turkish nationalism propelled President Recep Tayyip Erdoğan to gain unprecedented power in a national referendum. Reactions from world leaders were mixed, with Western European leaders generally expressing concern, while the leaders of many of the more authoritarian regimes as well as President Trump offered their congratulations.

== Political science ==
Many political scientists have theorized about the foundations of the modern nation-state and the concept of sovereignty. The concept of nationalism in political science draws from these theoretical foundations. Philosophers like Machiavelli, Locke, Hobbes, and Rousseau conceptualized the state as the result of a "social contract" between rulers and individuals. Max Weber provided the most commonly used definition of the state as "that human community which successfully lays claim to the monopoly of legitimate physical violence within a certain territory". In Imagined Communities: Reflections on the Origin and Spread of Nationalism (1983), Benedict Anderson writes that nations are socially constructed communities imagined by people who perceive themselves as part of a group. Anderson analyzed the rise of nationalism in relation to the emergence of print capitalism and the proliferation of printed media in vernacular languages.

Contemporary scholarship often describes the core political principle underlying these developments as the alignment between a political community and the authority that governs it. In this view, a stable state rests on the consent of a population that recognizes itself as a distinct collective with a legitimate claim to self-rule. This does not imply uniformity of opinion or culture, but rather a shared framework of belonging that enables democratic participation, defense of sovereignty, and resistance to both external domination and internal authoritarianism.

Many scholars have noted the relationship between state-building, war, and nationalism. John Etherington argues nationalism is inherently exclusionary and thus potentially violent, while Jeffrey Herbst posits that external threats can foster nationalist sentiment: "External threats have such a powerful effect on nationalism because people realize in a profound manner that they are under threat because of who they are as a nation; they are forced to recognize that it is only as a nation that they can successfully defeat the threat". With increased external threats, the state's extractive capacities increase. He links the lack of external threats to countries in Sub-Saharan Africa, post-independence, to weak state nationalism and state capacity. Barry Posen argues that nationalism increases the intensity of war, and that states deliberately promote nationalism with the aim of improving their military capabilities. Most new nation-states since 1815 have emerged through decolonization.

Adria Lawrence has argued that nationalism in the colonial world was spurred by failures of colonial powers to extend equal political rights to the subjects in the colonies, thus prompting them to pursue independence. Michael Hechter has argued similarly that "peripheral nationalisms" formed when empires prevented peripheral regions from enjoying political autonomy and local rule.

== Sociology ==
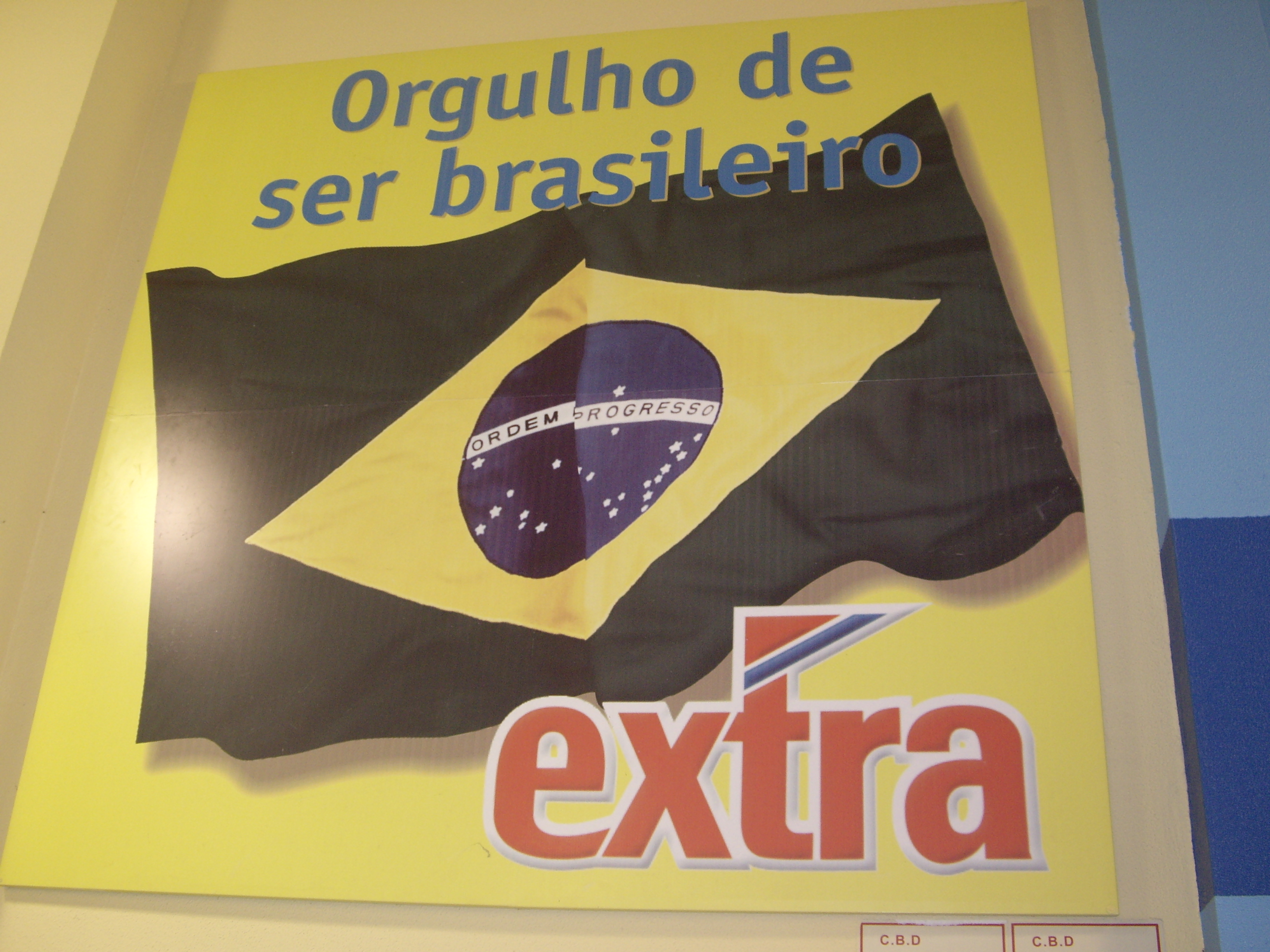
Nationalistic advertisement from the Extra supermarket in Fortaleza, Brazil. The sign reads "Proud to be Brazilian".

The sociological or modernist interpretation of nationalism and nation-building argues that nationalism arises and flourishes in modern societies that have an industrial economy capable of self-sustainability, a central supreme authority capable of maintaining authority and unity, and a centralized language understood by a community of people. Modernist theorists note that this is only possible in modern societies, while traditional societies typically lack the prerequisites for nationalism. They lack a modern self-sustainable economy, have divided authorities, and use multiple languages resulting in many groups being unable to communicate with each other. Prominent theorists who developed the modernist interpretation of nations and nationalism include Carlton J. H. Hayes, Henry Maine, Ferdinand Tönnies, Rabindranath Tagore, Émile Durkheim, Max Weber, Arnold Joseph Toynbee, and Talcott Parsons.

In his analysis of the historical changes and development of human societies, Henry Maine noted the key distinction between traditional societies, defined as "status" societies based on family association and functionally diffuse roles for individuals, and modern societies, defined as "contract" societies where social relations are determined by rational contracts pursued by individuals to advance their interests. Maine saw the development of societies as moving away from traditional status societies to modern contract societies.

In his book Gemeinschaft und Gesellschaft (1887), Ferdinand Tönnies defined a Gemeinschaft ("community") as being based on emotional attachments as attributed with traditional societies while defining a Gesellschaft ("society") as an impersonal society that is modern. Although he recognized the advantages of modern societies, he also criticized them for their cold and impersonal nature that caused alienation while praising the intimacy of traditional communities.

Responding to Tönnies' dichotomy, Émile Durkheim distinguished between traditional and modern societies through his concepts of mechanical solidarity and organic solidarity. In Durkheim's framework, mechanical solidarity characterizes traditional societies, where social cohesion relies on similarity, strong shared customs, and a powerful collective consciousness reinforced by repressive laws against nonconformity. In contrast, modern societies rely on organic solidarity, in which social integration is generated by the complex division of labour and the mutual interdependence of specialized individuals. However, Durkheim warned that rapid modernization and the impersonal nature of industrial society could outpace moral regulation, leading to anomie, a state of normlessness that weakens social cohesion.

Max Weber claimed the change that developed modern society and nations is the result of the rise of a charismatic leader to power in a society who creates a new tradition or a rational-legal system that establishes the supreme authority of the state. Weber's conception of charismatic authority has been noted as the basis of many nationalist governments.

=== Primordialist evolutionary interpretation ===
The primordialist perspective is based upon evolutionary theory. This approach has been popular with the general public but is typically rejected by experts. Laland and Brown report that "the vast majority of professional academics in the social sciences not only ... ignore evolutionary methods but in many cases [are] extremely hostile to the arguments" that draw vast generalizations from rather limited evidence.

The evolutionary theory of nationalism perceives nationalism to be the result of the evolution of human beings into identifying with groups, such as ethnic groups, or other groups that form the foundation of a nation. Roger Masters in The Nature of Politics describes the primordial explanation of the origin of ethnic and national groups as recognizing group attachments that are thought to be unique, emotional, intense, and durable because they are based upon kinship and promoted along lines of common ancestry.

The primordialist evolutionary views of nationalism often reference the evolutionary theories of Charles Darwin as well as Social Darwinist views of the late nineteenth century. Thinkers like Herbert Spencer and Walter Bagehot reinterpreted Darwin's theory of natural selection "often in ways inconsistent with Charles Darwin's theory of evolution" by making unsupported claims of biological difference among groups, ethnicities, races, and nations. Modern evolutionary sciences have distanced themselves from such views, but notions of long-term evolutionary change remain foundational to the work of evolutionary psychologists like John Tooby and Leda Cosmides.

Approached through the primordialist perspective, the example of seeing the mobilization of a foreign military force on the nation's borders may provoke members of a national group to unify and mobilize themselves in response. There are proximate environments where individuals identify nonimmediate real or imagined situations in combination with immediate situations that make individuals confront a common situation of both subjective and objective components that affect their decisions. As such proximate environments cause people to make decisions based on existing situations and anticipated situations.

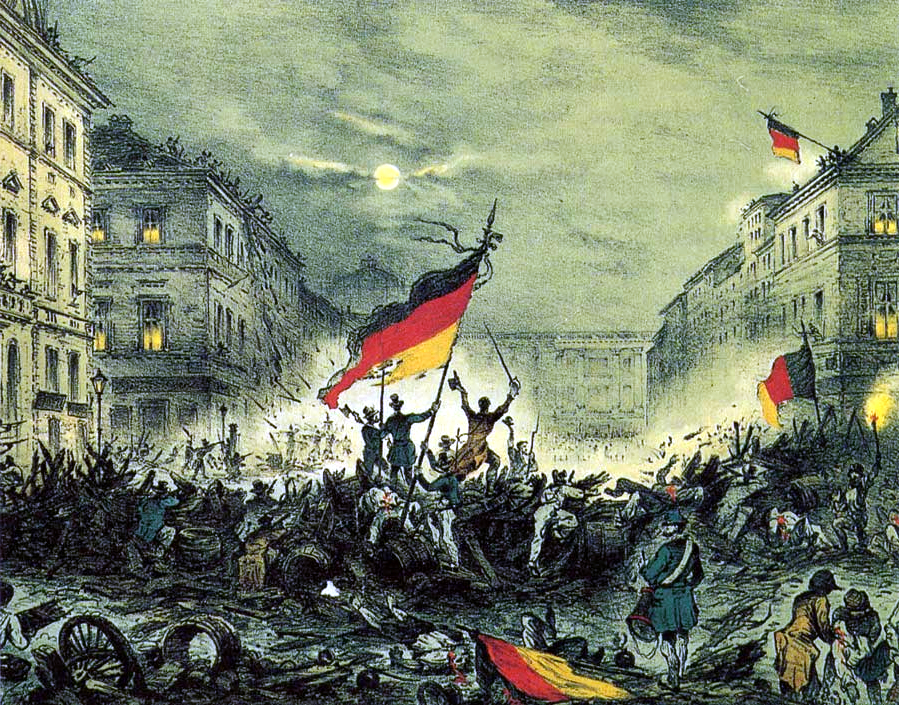
Nationalist and liberal pressure led to the European Revolutions of 1848.

Critics argue that primordial models relying on evolutionary psychology are based not on historical evidence but on assumptions of unobserved changes over thousands of years and assume stable genetic composition of the population living in a specific area and are incapable of handling the contingencies that characterize every known historical process. Robert Hislope argues:

[T]he articulation of cultural evolutionary theory represents theoretical progress over sociobiology, but its explanatory payoff remains limited due to the role of contingency in human affairs and the significance of non-evolutionary, proximate causal factors. While evolutionary theory undoubtedly elucidates the development of all organic life, it would seem to operate best at macro-levels of analysis, "distal" points of explanation, and from the perspective of the long-term. Hence, it is bound to display shortcomings at micro-level events that are highly contingent in nature.

In 1920, English historian G. P. Gooch argued that "[while patriotism is as old as human association and has gradually widened its sphere from the clan and the tribe to the city and the state, nationalism as an operative principle and an articulate creed only made its appearance among the more complicated intellectual processes of the modern world."

=== Marxist interpretations ===
In The Communist Manifesto (1848), Karl Marx and Friedrich Engels declared that "the working men have no country". Vladimir Lenin supported the concept of self-determination. In Marxism and the National Question (1913), Joseph Stalin wrote that "a nation is not a racial or tribal, but a historically constituted community of people"; "a nation is not a casual or ephemeral conglomeration, but a stable community of people"; "a nation is formed only as a result of lengthy and systematic intercourse, as a result of people living together generation after generation"; and in its entirety "a nation is a historically constituted, stable community of people, formed on the basis of a common language, territory, economic life, and psychological make-up manifested in a common culture."

== Types ==
Historians, sociologists, and anthropologists have debated different types of nationalism since at least the 1930s. Generally, the most common way of classifying nationalism has been to describe movements as having either "civic" or "ethnic" nationalist characteristics. This distinction was popularized in the 1950s by Hans Kohn who described "civic" nationalism as "Western" and more democratic while depicting "ethnic" nationalism as "Eastern" and undemocratic. Since the 1980s, scholars of nationalism have pointed out numerous flaws in this rigid division and proposed more specific classifications and numerous varieties.

=== Anti-colonial ===
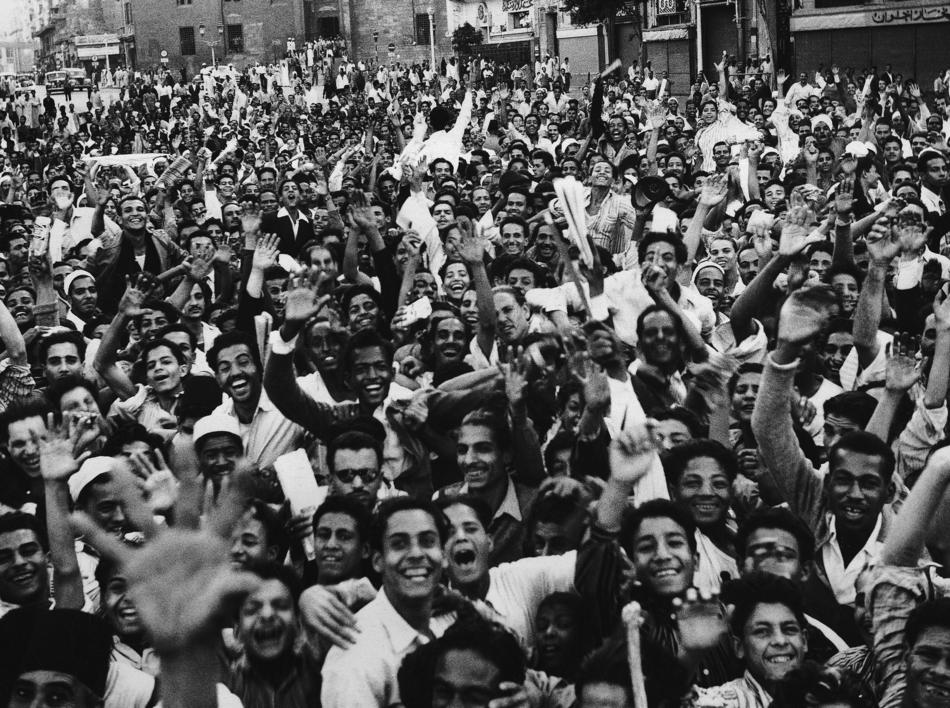
Crowd demonstrates against Britain in Cairo on 23 October 1951 as tension continued to mount in the dispute between Egypt and Britain over control of the Suez Canal and Anglo-Egyptian Sudan.

Anti-colonial nationalism is an intellectual framework that preceded, accompanied and followed the process of decolonization in the mid-1900s. Benedict Anderson defined a nation as a socially constructed community that is co-created by individuals who imagine themselves as part of this group. He points to the New World as the site that originally conceived of nationalism as a concept, which is defined by its imagination of an ahistorical identity that negates colonialism by definition. This concept of nationalism was exemplified by the transformation of settler colonies into nations, while anti-colonial nationalism is exemplified by movements against colonial powers in the 1900s.

Nationalist mobilization in French colonial Africa and British colonial India developed "when colonial regimes refused to cede rights to their increasingly well-educated colonial subjects", who formed indigenous elites and strategically adopted and adapted nationalist tactics. New national identities may cross pre-existing ethnic or linguistic divisions. Anti-colonial independence movements in Africa and Asia in the 1900s were led by individuals who had a set of shared identities and imagined a homeland without external rule. Anderson argues that the racism often experienced as a result of colonial rule and attributed to nationalism is rather due to theories of class.

Gellner's theory of nationalism argues that nationalism works for combining one culture or ethnicity in one state, which leads to that state's success. For Gellner, nationalism is ethnic, and state political parties should reflect the ethnic majority in the state. This definition of nationalism also contributes to anti-colonial nationalism, if one conceives of anti-colonial movements to be movements consisting of one specific ethnic group against an outside ruling party. Edward Said also saw nationalism as ethnic, at least in part, and argued that nationalist narratives often go hand in hand with racism, as communities define themselves in relation to the other. Anti-colonial nationalism is not static and is defined by different forms of nationalism depending on location. In the anti-colonial movement that took place in the Indian subcontinent, Mahatma Gandhi and his allies in the Indian independence movement argued for a composite nationalism, not believing that an independent Indian nation should be defined by its religious identity. Despite large-scale opposition by the Indian National Congress supporters, the insistence of the Muslims under the separatist Muslim League resulted in the Indian subcontinent being partitioned into two states in 1947 along religious lines into the Muslim-majority Dominion of Pakistan and the Hindu-majority Dominion of India.

Philosopher and scholar Achille Mbembe argues that post-colonialism is a contradictory term, because colonialism is ever present. Those that participate in this intellectual practice envision a post-colonialism despite its being the defining frame for the world. This is the case with anti-colonialism as well. Anti-colonial nationalism as an intellectual framework persisted into the late 20th century with the resistance movements in Soviet satellite states and continues with independence movements in the Arab world in the 21st century.

=== Civic and liberal ===
Civic nationalism defines the nation as an association of people who identify themselves as belonging to the nation, who have equal and shared political rights, and allegiance to similar political procedures. According to the principles of civic nationalism, the nation is not based on common ethnic ancestry, but is a political entity whose core identity is not ethnicity. This civic concept of nationalism is exemplified by Ernest Renan in his lecture in 1882 "What is a Nation?", where he defined the nation as a "daily referendum" (frequently translated "daily plebiscite") dependent on the will of its people to continue living together.

Liberal nationalism is commonly considered to be compatible with liberal values of freedom, tolerance, equality, and individual rights. Ernest Renan and John Stuart Mill are often thought to be early liberal nationalists. Liberal nationalists often defend the value of national identity by saying that individuals need a national identity to lead meaningful, autonomous lives, and that liberal democratic polities need national identity to function properly.

Civic nationalism lies within the traditions of rationalism and liberalism, but as a form of nationalism it is usually contrasted with ethnic nationalism. Civic nationalism is correlated with long-established states whose dynastic rulers had gradually acquired multiple distinct territories, with little change to boundaries, but which contained historical populations of multiple linguistic and/or confessional backgrounds. Since individuals living within different parts of the state territory might have little obvious common ground, civic nationalism developed as a way for rulers to both explain a contemporary reason for such heterogeneity and to provide a common purpose (Ernest Renan's classic description in What is a Nation? (1882) as a voluntary partnership for a common endeavor). Renan argued that factors such as ethnicity, language, religion, economics, geography, ruling dynasty and historic military deeds were important but not sufficient. Needed was a spiritual soul that allowed as a "daily referendum" among the people. Civic-national ideals influenced the development of representative democracy in multiethnic countries such as the United States and France, as well as in constitutional monarchies such as Great Britain, Belgium and Spain.

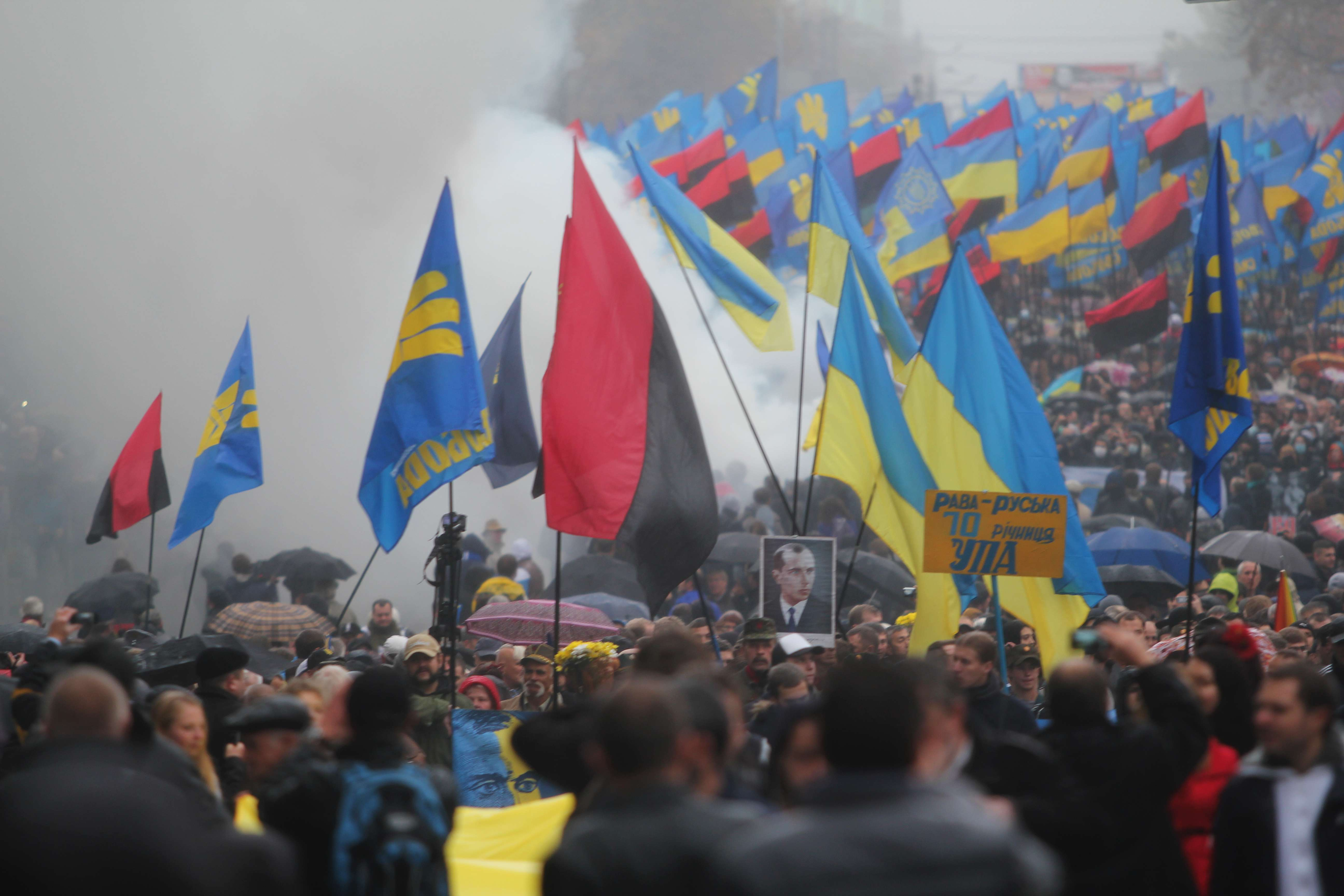
Ukrainian nationalists carry portraits of Stepan Bandera and flags of the Ukrainian Insurgent Army.

=== Creole ===
Creole nationalism is the ideology that emerged in independence movements among the creoles (descendants of the colonizers), especially in Latin America in the early 19th century. It was facilitated when French Emperor Napoleon seized control of Spain and Portugal, breaking the chain of control from the Spanish and Portuguese kings to the local governors. Allegiance to the Napoleonic states was rejected, and increasingly the creoles demanded independence. They achieved it after civil wars 1808–1826.

=== Ethnic ===
Ethnic nationalism, also known as ethno-nationalism, is a form of nationalism wherein the "nation" is defined in terms of ethnicity. The central theme of ethnic nationalists is that "nations are defined by a shared heritage, which usually includes a common language, a common faith, and a common ethnic ancestry". It also includes ideas of a culture shared between members of the group, and with their ancestors. It is different from a purely cultural definition of "the nation," which allows people to become members of a nation by cultural assimilation; and from a purely linguistic definition, according to which "the nation" consists of all speakers of a specific language. Whereas nationalism in and of itself does not imply a belief in the superiority of one ethnicity or country over others, some nationalists support ethnocentric supremacy or protectionism. The humiliation of being a second-class citizen led regional minorities in multiethnic states, such as Great Britain, Spain, France, Germany, Russia and the Ottoman Empire, to define nationalism in terms of loyalty to their minority culture, especially language and religion. Forced assimilation was anathema. For the politically dominant cultural group, assimilation was necessary to minimize disloyalty and treason and therefore became a major component of nationalism. A second factor for the politically dominant group was competition with neighboring states—nationalism involved a rivalry, especially in terms of military prowess and economic strength.

=== Economic ===
Economic nationalism, or economic patriotism, is an ideology that favors state interventionism in the economy, with policies that emphasize domestic control of the economy, labor, and capital formation, even if this requires the imposition of tariffs and other restrictions on the movement of labor, goods and capital.

=== Gendered and muscular ===
Feminist critique interprets nationalism as a mechanism through which sexual control and repression are justified and legitimized, often by a dominant masculine power. The gendering of nationalism through socially constructed notions of masculinity and femininity not only shapes what masculine and feminine participation in the building of that nation will look like, but also how the nation will be imagined by nationalists. A nation having its own identity is viewed as necessary, and often inevitable, and these identities are gendered. The physical land itself is often gendered as female (i.e. "Motherland"), with a body in constant danger of violation by foreign males, while national pride and protectiveness of "her" borders is gendered as masculine.

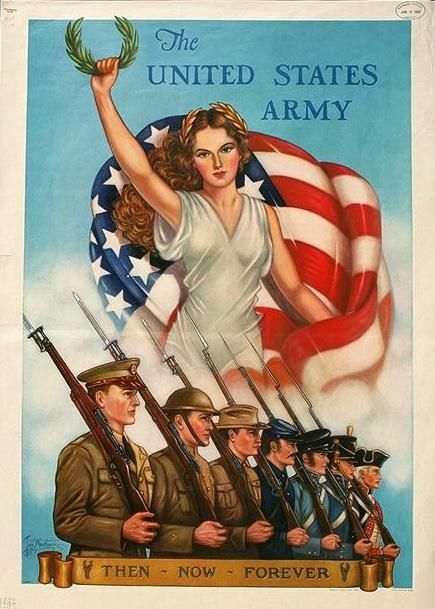
World War II United States patriotic army recruiting poster

History, political ideologies, and religions place most nations along a continuum of muscular nationalism. Muscular nationalism conceptualizes a nation's identity as being derived from muscular or masculine attributes that are unique to a particular country. If definitions of nationalism and gender are understood as socially and culturally constructed, the two may be constructed in conjunction by invoking an "us" versus "them" dichotomy for the purpose of the exclusion of the so-called "other," who is used to reinforce the unifying ties of the nation. The empowerment of one gender, nation or sexuality tends to occur at the expense and disempowerment of another; in this way, nationalism can be used as an instrument to perpetuate heteronormative structures of power. The gendered manner in which dominant nationalism has been imagined in most states in the world has had important implications on not only individual's lived experience, but on international relations. Colonialism has historically been heavily intertwined with muscular nationalism, from research linking hegemonic masculinity and empire-building, to intersectional oppression being justified by colonialist images of the "other", a practice integral in the formation of Western identity. This "othering" may come in the form of orientalism, whereby the East is feminized and sexualized by the West. The imagined feminine East, or "other," exists in contrast to the masculine West.

The status of conquered nations can become a causality dilemma: the nation was "conquered because they were effeminate and seen as effeminate because they were conquered." In defeat they are considered militaristically unskilled, not aggressive, and thus not muscular. In order for a nation to be considered "proper", it must possess the male-gendered characteristics of virility, as opposed to the stereotypically female characteristics of subservience and dependency. Muscular nationalism is often inseparable from the concept of a warrior, which shares ideological commonalities across many nations; they are defined by the masculine notions of aggression, willingness to engage in war, decisiveness, and muscular strength, as opposed to the feminine notions of peacefulness, weakness, non-violence, and compassion. This masculinized image of a warrior has been theorized to be "the culmination of a series of gendered historical and social processes" played out in a national and international context. Ideas of cultural dualism—of a martial man and chaste woman—which are implicit in muscular nationalism, underline the raced, classed, gendered, and heteronormative nature of dominant national identity.

Nations and gender systems are mutually supportive constructions: the nation fulfils the masculine ideals of comradeship and brotherhood. Masculinity has been cited as a notable factor in producing political militancy. A common feature of national crisis is a drastic shift in the socially acceptable ways of being a man, which then helps to shape the gendered perception of the nation as a whole.

=== Integral, pan and irredentism ===
There are different types of nationalism including Risorgimento nationalism and Integral nationalism. Whereas risorgimento nationalism applies to a nation seeking to establish a liberal state (for example the Risorgimento in Italy and similar movements in Greece, Germany, Poland during the 19th century or the civic American nationalism), integral nationalism results after a nation has achieved independence and has established a state. Fascist Italy and Nazi Germany, according to Alter and Brown, were examples of integral nationalism. Some of the qualities that characterize integral nationalism are anti-individualism, statism, radical extremism, and aggressive-expansionist militarism. The term Integral Nationalism often overlaps with fascism, although many natural points of disagreement exist. Integral nationalism arises in countries where a strong military ethos has become entrenched through the independence struggle, when, once independence is achieved, it is believed that a strong military is required to ensure the security and viability of the new state. Also, the success of such a liberation struggle results in feelings of national superiority that may lead to extreme nationalism. Pan-nationalism is unique in that it covers a large area span. Pan-nationalism focuses more on "clusters" of ethnic groups. Pan-Slavism is one example of Pan-nationalism. The goal is to unite all Slavic people into one country. They did succeed by uniting several south Slavic people into Yugoslavia in 1918.

=== Left-wing ===
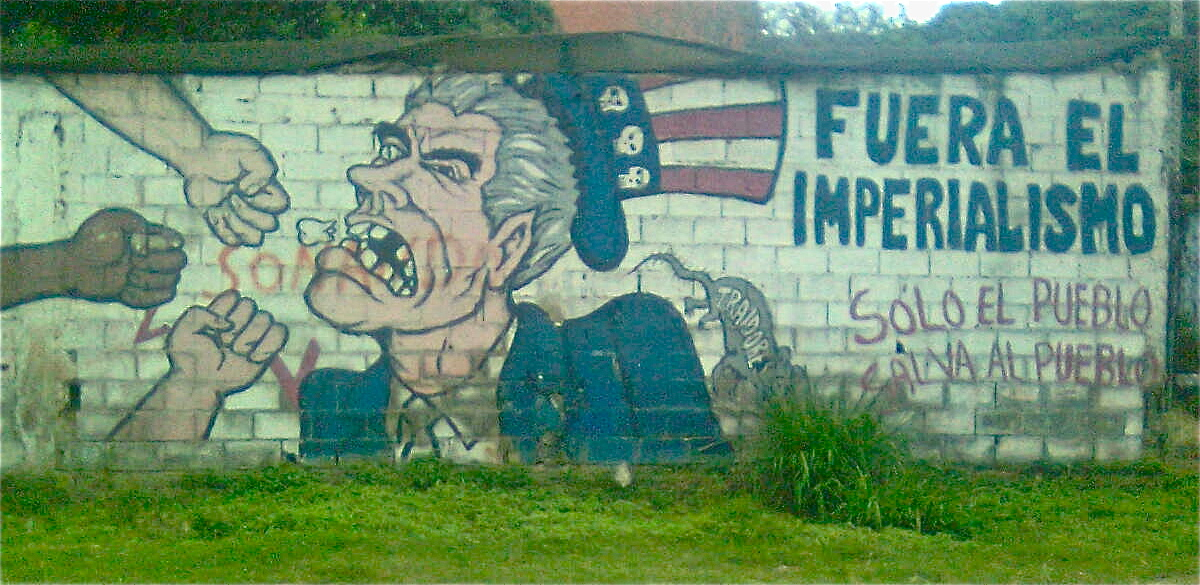
A political mural in Caracas featuring an anti-American and anti-imperialist message

Left-wing nationalism, occasionally known as socialist nationalism, not to be confused with the German fascist "National Socialism", is a political movement that combines left-wing politics with nationalism. Many nationalist movements are dedicated to national liberation, in the view that their nations are being persecuted by other nations and thus need to exercise self-determination by liberating themselves from the accused persecutors. Anti-revisionist forms of Marxism–Leninism are closely tied with this ideology, and practical examples include Stalin's early work Marxism and the National Question and his socialism in one country edict, which declares that nationalism can be used in an internationalist context, fighting for national liberation without racial or religious divisions. Other examples of left-wing nationalism include Fidel Castro's 26th of July Movement that launched the Cuban Revolution in 1959, Cornwall's Mebyon Kernow, Ireland's Sinn Féin, Wales's Plaid Cymru, Scotland's Scottish National Party, Galicia's Galician Nationalist Bloc, the Awami League in Bangladesh, the African National Congress in South Africa and numerous movements in Eastern Europe.

=== National-anarchism ===
Among the first advocates of national-anarchism were Hans Cany, Peter Töpfer and former National Front activist Troy Southgate, founder of the National Revolutionary Faction, a since disbanded British-based organization which cultivated links to certain far-left and far-right circles in the United Kingdom and in post-Soviet states, not to be confused with the national-anarchism of the Black Ram Group. In the United Kingdom, national-anarchists worked with Albion Awake, Alternative Green (published by former Green Anarchist editor Richard Hunt) and Jonathan Boulter to develop the Anarchist Heretics Fair. Those national-anarchists cite their influences primarily from Mikhail Bakunin, William Godwin, Peter Kropotkin, Pierre-Joseph Proudhon, Max Stirner and Leo Tolstoy.

A position developed in Europe during the 1990s, national-anarchist groups have seen arisen worldwide, most prominently in Australia (New Right Australia/New Zealand), Germany (International National Anarchism) and the United States (BANA). National-anarchism has been described as a radical right-wing nationalist ideology which advocates racial separatism and white racial purity. National-anarchists claim to syncretize neotribal ethnic nationalism with philosophical anarchism, mainly in their support for a stateless society whilst rejecting anarchist social philosophy. The main ideological innovation of national-anarchism is its anti-state palingenetic ultranationalism. National-anarchists advocate homogeneous communities in place of the nation state. National-anarchists claim that those of different ethnic or racial groups would be free to develop separately in their own tribal communes while striving to be politically meritocratic, economically non-capitalist, ecologically sustainable and socially and culturally traditional.

Although the term national-anarchism dates back as far as the 1920s, the contemporary national-anarchist movement has been put forward since the late 1990s by British political activist Troy Southgate, who positions it as being "beyond left and right". The few scholars who have studied national-anarchism conclude that it represents a further evolution in the thinking of the radical right rather than an entirely new dimension on the political spectrum. National-anarchism is considered by anarchists as being a rebranding of totalitarian fascism and an oxymoron due to the inherent contradiction of anarchist philosophy of anti-fascism, abolition of unjustified hierarchy, dismantling of national borders and universal equality between different nationalities as being incompatible with the idea of a synthesis between anarchism and fascism.

National-anarchism has elicited scepticism and outright hostility from both left-wing and far-right critics. Critics, including scholars, accuse national-anarchists of being nothing more than white nationalists who promote a communitarian and racialist form of ethnic and racial separatism while wanting the militant chic of calling themselves anarchists without the historical and philosophical baggage that accompanies such a claim, including the anti-racist egalitarian anarchist philosophy and the contributions of Jewish anarchists. Some scholars are sceptical that implementing national-anarchism would result in an expansion of freedom and describe it as an authoritarian anti-statism that would result in authoritarianism and oppression, only on a smaller scale.

=== Nativist ===
Nativist nationalism is a type of nationalism similar to creole or territorial types of nationalism, but which defines belonging to a nation solely by being born on its territory. In countries where strong nativist nationalism exists, people who were not born in the country are seen as lesser nationals than those who were born there and are called immigrants even if they became naturalized. It is cultural as people will never see a foreign-born person as one of them and is legal as such people are banned for life from holding certain jobs, especially government jobs. In scholarly studies, nativism is a standard technical term, although those who hold this political view do not typically accept the label. "[N]ativists ... do not consider themselves nativists. For them it is a negative term and they rather consider themselves as 'Patriots'."

=== Racial ===
Racial nationalism is an ideology that advocates a racial definition of national identity. Racial nationalism seeks to preserve a given race through policies such as banning race mixing and the immigration of other races. Its ideas tend to be in direct conflict with those of anti-racism and multiculturalism. Specific examples are black nationalism and white nationalism.

=== Territorial ===
Nationalist slogan "Brazil, love it or leave it", used during the Brazilian military dictatorship

Some nationalists exclude certain groups. Some nationalists, defining the national community in ethnic, linguistic, cultural, historic, or religious terms (or a combination of these), may then seek to deem certain minorities as not truly being a part of the 'national community' as they define it. Sometimes a mythic homeland is more important for the national identity than the actual territory occupied by the nation. Territorial nationalists assume that all inhabitants of a particular nation owe allegiance to their country of birth or adoption. A sacred quality is sought in the nation and in the popular memories it evokes. Citizenship is idealized by territorial nationalists. A criterion of a territorial nationalism is the establishment of a mass, public culture based on common values, codes and traditions of the population.

=== Sport ===
Sport spectacles like football's World Cup command worldwide audiences as nations battle for supremacy and the fans invest intense support for their national team. Increasingly people have tied their loyalties and even their cultural identity to national teams. The globalization of audiences through television and other media has generated revenues from advertisers and subscribers in the billions of dollars, as the FIFA Scandals of 2015 revealed. Jeff Kingston looks at football, the Commonwealth Games, baseball, cricket, and the Olympics and finds that, "The capacity of sports to ignite and amplify nationalist passions and prejudices is as extraordinary as is their power to console, unify, uplift and generate goodwill." The phenomenon is evident across most of the world. The British Empire strongly emphasized sports among its soldiers and agents across the world, and often the locals joined in enthusiastically. It established a high prestige competition in 1930, named the British Empire Games from 1930 to 1950, the British Empire and Commonwealth Games from 1954 to 1966, British Commonwealth Games from 1970 to 1974 and since then the Commonwealth Games. The French Empire was not far behind the British in the use of sports to strengthen colonial solidarity with France. Colonial officials promoted and subsidized gymnastics, table games, and dance and helped football spread to French colonies.

== Criticism ==
Critics of nationalism have argued that it is often unclear what constitutes a nation, or whether a nation is a legitimate unit of political rule. Nationalists hold that the boundaries of a nation and a state should coincide with one another, thus nationalism tends to oppose multiculturalism. It can also lead to conflict when more than one national group finds itself claiming rights to a particular territory or seeking to take control of the state. Philosopher A. C. Grayling describes nations as artificial constructs, "their boundaries drawn in the blood of past wars". He argues that "there is no country on earth which is not home to more than one different but usually coexisting culture. Cultural heritage is not the same thing as national identity".

Nationalism is considered by its critics to be inherently divisive, as adherents may draw upon and highlight perceived differences between people, emphasizing an individual's identification with their own nation. They also consider the idea to be potentially oppressive, because it can submerge individual identity within a national whole and give elites or political leaders potential opportunities to manipulate or control the masses. Much of the early opposition to nationalism was related to its geopolitical ideal of a separate state for every nation. The classic nationalist movements of the 19th century rejected the very existence of the multi-ethnic empires in Europe, contrary to an ideological critique of nationalism which developed into several forms of internationalism and anti-nationalism. The Islamic revival of the 20th century also produced an Islamist critique of the nation-state. (see Pan-Islamism)

At the end of the 19th century, socialists and communists produced political analyses that were critical of the nationalist movements then active in Central and Eastern Europe, although a variety of other contemporary socialists and communists, from Vladimir Lenin (a communist) to Józef Piłsudski (a socialist), were more sympathetic to national self-determination. In his classic essay on the topic, George Orwell distinguishes nationalism from patriotism (which he defines as devotion to a particular place). More abstractly, nationalism is "power-hunger tempered by self-deception". For Orwell, the nationalist is more likely than not dominated by irrational negative impulses:

A nationalist is one who thinks solely, or mainly, in terms of competitive prestige. He may be a positive or a negative nationalist—that is, he may use his mental energy either in boosting or in denigrating—but at any rate his thoughts always turn on victories, defeats, triumphs and humiliations. He sees history, especially contemporary history, as the endless rise and decline of great power units and every event that happens seems to him a demonstration that his own side is on the upgrade and some hated rival is on the downgrade. But finally, it is important not to confuse nationalism with mere worship of success. The nationalist does not go on the principle of simply ganging up with the strongest side. On the contrary, having picked his side, he persuades himself that it is the strongest and is able to stick to his belief even when the facts are overwhelmingly against him.

In the liberal political tradition, there was mostly a negative attitude toward nationalism as a dangerous force and a cause of conflict and war between nation-states. The historian Lord Acton put the case for "nationalism as insanity" in 1862. He argued that nationalism suppresses minorities, places country above moral principles and creates a dangerous individual attachment to the state. He opposed democracy and tried to defend the pope from Italian nationalism. Since the late 20th century, liberals have been increasingly divided, with some philosophers such as Michael Walzer, Isaiah Berlin, Charles Taylor, and David Miller emphasizing that a liberal society needs to be based in a stable nation state.

The pacifist critique of nationalism also concentrates on the violence of some nationalist movements, the associated militarism, and on conflicts between nations inspired by jingoism or chauvinism. National symbols and patriotic assertiveness are in some countries discredited by their historical link with past wars, especially in Germany. British pacifist Bertrand Russell criticized nationalism for diminishing the individual's capacity to judge his or her fatherland's foreign policy. Albert Einstein stated that "Nationalism is an infantile disease. It is the measles of mankind". Jiddu Krishnamurti stated that "Nationalism is merely the glorification of tribalism". Transhumanists have also expressed their opposition to nationalism, to the extent that some transhumanists believe national identities should be dissolved entirely. The influential transhumanist FM-2030 refused to identify with any nationality, referring to himself as 'universal'. Furthermore, in The Transhumanist Handbook, Kate Levchuk stated that a transhumanist "doesn't believe in nationality".

== See also ==
- Lists of historical separatist movements
- List of active nationalist parties in Europe
- Lists of active separatist movements
- National memory
- Nationalism and archaeology
- Nationalism in the Middle Ages
- Nationalism studies, an interdisciplinary academic field devoted to the study of nationalism
- Nationalization of history
- Notes on Nationalism, an essay by George Orwell on types of nationalism in the late World War Two world
- Xenophobia
