= Nationalism in the Middle Ages =

Area of study in European history

Several scholars of nationalism support the existence of nationalism in the Middle Ages, mainly in Europe. This school of thought differs from modernism, the predominant school of thought on nationalism, which suggests that nationalism developed largely after the late 18th century and the French Revolution. Theories on the existence of nationalism in the Middle Ages may belong to the general paradigms of ethnosymbolism and primordialism (perennialism).

== Western and Northern Europe ==
Adrian Hastings advocates the origin of nations in the Middle Ages and argues that religion was central to the creation of nations and nationalism. In his view, England is considered the oldest example of a mature nation, and the development of nations is closely linked to the Christian Church and the spread of written popular languages to existing ethnic groups. Hastings argues for a strong renewal of English nationalism with the translation of the complete bible into English by the Wycliffe circle in the 1380s, positing that the frequency and consistency in usage of the word nation from the early fourteenth century onward strongly suggest English nationalism and the English nation have been continuous since that time.

However, John Breuilly criticizes the assumption that continued usage of a term such as "English" means continuity in its meaning. Patrick J. Geary agrees, arguing names were adapted to different circumstances by different powers and could convince people of continuity, even if radical discontinuity was the lived reality.

Susan Reynolds argues that many European medieval kingdoms were nations in the modern sense, except that political participation in nationalism was available only to a limited prosperous and literate class, while Hastings claims England's Anglo-Saxon kings mobilized mass nationalism in their struggle to repel Norse invasions. He argues that Alfred the Great, in particular, drew on biblical language in his law code and that during his reign selected books of the Bible were translated into Old English to inspire Englishmen to fight to turn back the Norse invaders.

Echoing Reynolds, Paul Lawrence criticises Hastings's reading of Bede's Ecclesiastical History of the English People, observing that such documents do not demonstrate how ordinary people identified themselves. He points out that, while they serve as texts in which an elite defines itself, "their significance in relation to what the majority thought and felt was likely to have been minor".

However, other authors trace the origins of nationalism and the national consciousness of England and some European nations soon after the Middle Ages, in the 16th century.

For many non-modernists, nations have emerged from the Judeo-Christian tradition. John Alexander Armstrong was one of the first modern scholars to argue that nations have pre-modern roots and that their formation was helped by religious institutions locally. However, Armstrong acknowledges "persistent group identity did not ordinarily constitute the overriding legitimisation of polity formation", unlike contemporary nationalism, which presupposes the "right of individuals to [...] establish territorial political structures corresponding to their consciousness of group identity". In the same vein, other anti-modernist studies by Hastings, Anthony D. Smith, and Steven Grosby attributed nationalism on the Judeo-Christian traditions. Hastings emphasises the role of language, and sees the opposition of Christianity to Islam as a critical factor in the formation of nationalism. He also considers the conviction of being a chosen people as an important factor in ethnogenesis in Western Europe, which was further strengthened by the tension between Catholicism and Protestantism.

Azar Gat claims the creation of nations was made possible not only by secularization and the rise of print capitalism in modern era, but could also be produced earlier by the spoken word and via religious rituals. Gat does not agree with the modernist view that pre-modern multi-ethnic empires were ruled by an elite indifferent to the ethnic composition of its subjects. In fact, almost all of the empires were based on a dominant ethnic core, while most ethnic communities were too small and weak to have their own independent state. In response to Gat, Chris Wickham accepted manifestations of national identity are to be found in the Middle Ages, but argued that Gat "exaggerated the significance of ethnicity in that period" and that such national identity as existed was confined to those very elites.

According to the historian Caspar Hirschi, the concept nations and nationalism has changed over time, and the 18th century is only the beginning of the modernist model of this concept. In his view, nationalism was born in Catholic Medieval Europe as a consequence of Roman imperialism. Echoing Wickham, Hirschi accepts nationalism is not necessarily a mass phenomenon but can be the discourse of nationalist elite minorities.

Sverre Bagge investigates the origins of Norwegian nationalism from the gradual "unification of the kingdom" in the 9th century, which led to the formation of the Norwegian, Danish and Swedish kingdoms. He argues a kind of Norwegian state existed by the 13th century, with public justice, taxation, a common military organization and royalty, and by the 12th and 13th century, a significant part of the population was loyal to the king and identified their interests with his.

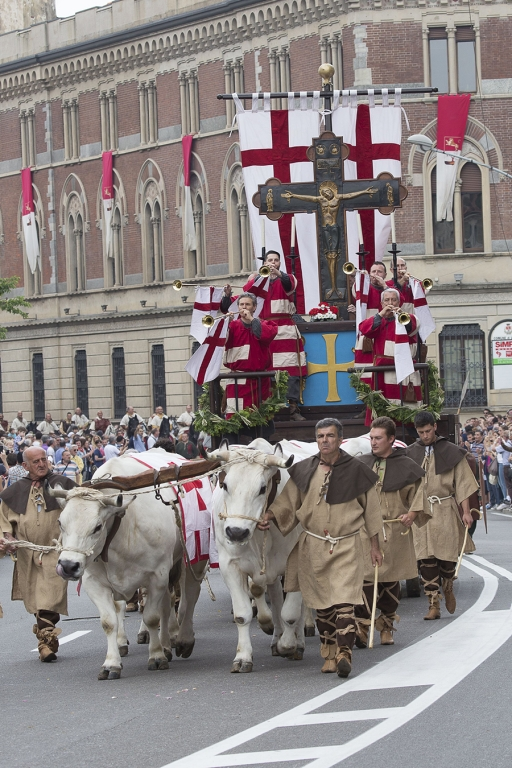
The Carroccio (the sacred car) was a powerful symbol of the identity and honor of North Italian city-states during the civic nationalism period of mid 12th to 14th century. (Karatasli, p. 13). Here, reproduction of the Carroccio during the parade of the Palio di Legnano, 2015.

Sahan Karatasli examines various forms of collective identity in Northern Italy from the 11th to 16th century and believes that, in the mid-12th century, city-states exhibited civic nationalism. In that period, the communes of the cities incorporated their countryside (contado) and acquired a territorial existence. This process created internal social divisions and rivalries, which was the reason for the invention of new forms of bonds between social groups and between state and subjects. Older practices like the ecclesiastical boundaries (diocese) were used, which unified the city and the countryside. New symbols, myths and "invented traditions" were also created, such as the new cults of patron-saints, like Saint Ansano of Siena, St. Alexander patron of Bergamo, St. Petronio, patron of the Bologna etc. Civic rituals and festivals associated with these saints emphasised the unity of the commune or the city-state were established.

== Eastern Orthodox Church, Byzantium, Slavs and Greeks ==
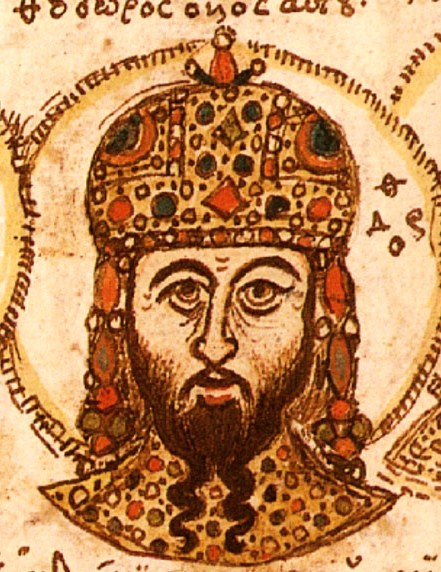
Byzantine Emperor Theodore II Laskaris was a staunch supporter of the name Hellenes as a means of naming the empire and its inhabitants, as well as the first emperor to refer to the empire itself as Hellas.

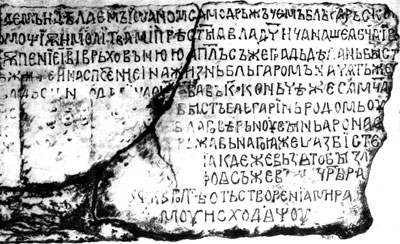
The Bitola inscription from 1017 reveals that Tsar Samuil and his successors considered their state Bulgarian, and they had incipient Bulgarian ethnic consciousness.

Dimitri Obolensky considers that the Orthodox Slavs in Eastern Europe and the Balkans (Russians, Bulgarians and Serbs) had nationalism and a national consciousness during the Middle Ages. This nationalism was mobilized by their dissatisfaction with the imperialism of the Byzantines, especially in ecclesiastical matters, such as the appointment of bishops by the Patriarch of Constantinople. From a positive point of view, the Patriarch helped the creation of national consciousness by establishing ecclesiastical districts in Slavic areas. This also happened with other non-Slavic Orthodox peoples, as the Georgian Church was separated from the Antiochian Church in 1010, and the dioceses of Wallachia and Moldavia were founded in 1359 and in 1401, respectively. The Patriarchate from time to time made such concessions to other Slavic Christian populations, such as granting autocephaly to the Churches of Bulgaria and Serbia, or appointing ethnic Russians as Metropolitans of Kiev.

Some scholars believe that the roots of modern Greek nationalism dates back to the Middle Ages, especially between the 13th and mid-15th centuries. In this view, the event that led to the development of modern Greek national consciousness was the conflict with the Fourth Crusade and subsequent Frankish rule. Modern Greek nationalism rises after the conquest of Constantinople in 1204 and the creation of the despotates which succeeded the Byzantine Empire, especially in Epirus, Nicaea, and Morea. At that time, the term Hellene ("Greek") revived – having been previously discredited as a synonym for "pagan" – and was used in parallel with "Roman". Stephen G. Xydis uses the term proto-nationalism for the emergence of the modern Greek national identity in late Byzantium.

Armstrong refers to a "premature nationalism" of this Byzantine period, based on a sense of God's choice and protection in an age of adversities. As "true Israel", the Orthodox Church and the community enjoyed God's favor, while priests and the people fought against the "heretical" Latins and the "unfaithful" Turks.

According to Michel Bouchard, the Ecumenical Patriarchate of Constantinople facilitated the formation of national autonomous Orthodox Churches by producing national alphabets like the Early Cyrillic alphabet. Through an analysis of a 14th-century religious text, he argues that there was a clear sense of Russian nationhood and proposes such texts demonstrate the need to revise some assumptions concerning the presumed modern nature of nationhood. In an earlier work, Bouchard traces the emergence of Russian national consciousness to the 11th century, reflected in religious texts such as Slavic psalms and apocrypha. According to Richard J. Crampton, the development of Old Church Slavonic literacy during the 10th century had the effect of preventing the assimilation of the Eastern South Slavs into the Byzantine culture, which promoted the formation of a distinct Bulgarian identity.
