= Imagined Communities =

1983 book by Benedict Anderson

Imagined Communities: Reflections on the Origin and Spread of Nationalism
- First edition
- Author: Benedict Anderson
- Language: English
- Published: 1983 (Verso); 1991 (Second Edition); 2006 (Third Edition)
- Pages: 160
- ISBN: 0860910598

Imagined Communities: Reflections on the Origin and Spread of Nationalism is a book by Benedict Anderson about the development of national feeling in different eras and throughout different geographies across the world. It introduced the term "imagined communities" as a descriptor of a social group—specifically nations—and the term has since entered standard usage in myriad political and social science fields. The book was first published in 1983 and was reissued with additional chapters in 1991 and a further revised version in 2006.

The book is widely considered influential in the social sciences, with Eric G.E. Zuelow describing the book as "perhaps the most read book about nationalism." It is among the top 10 most-cited publications in the social sciences.

In its Chinese edition, Taiwanese translator Wu Rwei-Ren states in the preface that the immediate impetus for Benedict Anderson—long engaged in the study of Southeast Asian affairs—to write this work, was the outbreak of the Third Indochina War in 1978–79 among China, Vietnam, and Cambodia.

== Historical argument ==
According to Anderson's theory of imagined communities, the main historical causes of nationalism coincided with the start of the Industrial Revolution and include:

- the increasing importance of mass vernacular literacy,
- the movement to abolish the ideas of rule by divine right and hereditary monarchy ("the concept was born in an age in which Enlightenment and Revolution were destroying the legitimacy of the divinely ordained, hierarchical dynastic realm....[N]ations dream of being free...The gauge and emblem of this freedom is the sovereign state...", 1991, 7),
- and the emergence of print capitalism ("the convergence of capitalism and print technology... standardization of national calendars, clocks and language was embodied in books and the publication of daily newspapers").

== Nation as an imagined community ==
According to Anderson, nations are socially constructed. For Anderson, the idea of the "nation" is relatively new and is a product of various socio-material forces. He defined a nation as "an imagined political community—and imagined as both inherently limited and sovereign". As Anderson puts it, a nation "is imagined, because the members of even the smallest nation will never know most of their fellow-members, meet them, or even hear of them, yet, in the minds of each lives the image of their communion." While members of the community probably will never know each of the other members, face-to-face, they identify as part of the same nation and may have similar interests. Members hold, in their minds, a mental image of their affinity: the nationhood felt with other members of your nation when your "imagined community" is in conflict with neighboring nations or when participating in an international event such as the Olympic Games.

Nations are "limited" in that they have "finite, if elastic boundaries, beyond which lie other nations". They are "sovereign," since no dynastic monarchy can claim authority over them, in the modern period:

[T]he concept was born in an age in which Enlightenment and Revolution were destroying the legitimacy of the divinely-ordained, hierarchical dynastic realm. Coming to maturity at a stage of human history when even the most devout adherents of any universal religion were inescapably confronted with the living pluralism of such religions, and the allomorphism [incongruence, divide] between each faith's ontological claims and territorial stretch, nations dream of being free, and, if under God, directly so. The gauge and emblem of this freedom is the sovereign state.

Even though we may never see anyone in our imagined community, we still know they are there through communication means, such as newspapers. He describes the act of reading a daily paper as a "mass ceremony:”

"It is performed in silent privacy, in the lair of the skull. Yet each communicant is well aware that the ceremony he performs is being replicated simultaneously by thousands (or millions) of others of whose existence he is confident, yet of whose identity he has not the slightest notion." (35)

Finally, a nation is a community, because,

regardless of the actual inequality and exploitation that may prevail in each, the nation is always conceived as a deep, horizontal comradeship. Ultimately it is this fraternity that makes it possible, over the past two centuries, for so many millions of people, not so much to kill, as willingly to die for such limited imaginings.

== Critique ==
The first major critique of Anderson's theory was set forth by Partha Chatterjee, who contends that European colonialism de facto imposed limits to nationalism: "Even our imaginations must remain, forever, colonized" (Chatterjee, 1993: 5).

Feminist historians, like Linda McDowell, have noted a much broader but also unreflexive acceptance of nationalism, as a gendered vision: "the very term horizontal comradeship [...] brings with it connotations of masculine solidarity" (McDowell, 1999: 195). Imagined Communities does not directly address the gendered nature of nationalism.

Adrian Hastings criticized the modernist interpretations of Anderson and another Marxist historian, Eric Hobsbawm, for restricting the emergence of nationalism to the modern period and the eighteenth century. Using England as an example, Hastings suggested that nascent forms of national identity emerged in the medieval period.

Dean Kostantaras argued that Anderson's study of nationalism was far too broad, and the topic required a much more thorough investigation.

Writing in a retrospective essay for The New Republic in 2024, Samuel Clowes Huneke argued that the book suffered from flaws in its Marxist framework, stating that it "cannot explain the devotion that nations have and continue to inspire," while arguing, further, that Anderson's emphasis on "nations inspiring love" ignores a history of racism in the rise of nationalism, ultimately claiming that while the book "offers a compelling account of nationalism’s origins, then, it speaks little to the guises in which nationalism has reappeared in the twenty-first century, at the same time "[t]he notion that the conjoined spread of capitalism and nationalism—both of which were amply wrapped up in colonialism—had nothing to do with racism is risible."

== See also ==
- Nations and Nationalism by Ernest Gellner and Gellner's theory of nationalism
- Nations and Nationalism Since 1780: Programme, Myth, Reality and The Invention of Tradition by Eric Hobsbawm
