= Imagined community =

Nation as a socially constructed community

An imagined community is a concept developed by Benedict Anderson in his 1983 book Imagined Communities to analyze nationalism. Anderson depicts a nation as a socially constructed community, imagined by the people who perceive themselves as part of a group.

Anderson focuses on the way media creates imagined communities, especially the power of print media in shaping an individual's social psyche. Anderson analyzes the written word, a tool used by churches, authors, and media companies (notably books, newspapers, and magazines), as well as governmental tools such as the map, the census, and the museum. These tools were all built to target and define a mass audience in the public sphere through dominant images, ideologies, and language. Anderson explores the racist and colonial origins of these practices before explaining a general theory that demonstrates how contemporary governments and corporations can (and frequently do) utilize these same practices. These theories were not originally applied to the Internet or television.

== Origin ==
According to Anderson, the creation of imagined communities has become possible because of "print capitalism". Capitalist entrepreneurs printed their books and media in the vernacular in order to maximize circulation. As a result, readers speaking various local dialects became able to understand each other, and a common discourse emerged. Anderson argued that the first European nation states were thus formed around their "national print-languages." Anderson argues that the first form of capitalism started with the process of printing books and religious materials. The process of printing texts in the vernacular started right after books began to be printed in script languages, such as Latin, which saturated the elite market. At the moment it was also observed that just a small category of people was speaking it and was part of the bilingual society. The start of cultural and national revolution was around 1517 when Martin Luther presented his views regarding the scripture, that people should be able to read it in their own homes. In the following years, from 1520 to 1540, more than half of the books printed in German translation bore his name. Moreover, the first European nation states that are presented as having formed around their "national print-languages" are said to be found in the Anglo-Saxon region, nowadays England, and around today's Germany. Not only in Western Europe was the process of creating a nation emerging. In a few centuries, most European nations had created their own national languages but still were using languages such as Latin, French or German (primarily French and German) for political affair.

== Nationalism and imagined communities ==
According to Anderson's theory of imagined communities, the main existential cause of nationalism is secularization, the historical decline in the imagined religious community that was oriented toward the afterlife and literal immortality in favor of one oriented toward legacy and earthly (rather than otherworldly) future continuity beyond death. This included undermining the ideas of rule by divine right and hereditary monarchy; and converged with the emergence of printing press capitalism ("the convergence of capitalism and print technology... standardization of national calendars, clocks and language was embodied in books and the publication of daily newspapers")—all phenomena occurring with the start of the Industrial Revolution. From this, Anderson argues that with the enlightenment and the industrial age, people began distinguishing more sharply between what was considered divine and what constituted history and politics. Initially, these concepts were intertwined, as a common religion unified society across Europe, serving as the foundation for both spiritual and political life. With the emergence of the printing press and capitalism, people gained national consciousness regarding the common values that bring those people together. The new imagined communities started with the creation of their own nation print-languages that each individual spoke. That helped develop the first forms of known nation-states, who then created their own form of art, novels, publications, mass media, and communications.

While attempting to define nationalism, Anderson identifies three paradoxes:

1. The objective modernity of nations to the historians' eyes vs. their subjective antiquity in the eyes of nationalists.
2. The formal universality of nationality as a socio-cultural concept [...] vs. the irremediable particularity of its concrete manifestations
3. The "political power of such nationalisms vs. their philosophical poverty and even incoherence."

Anderson talks of Unknown Soldier tombs as an example of nationalism. The tombs of Unknown Soldiers are either empty or hold unidentified remains, but each nation with these kinds of memorials claims these soldiers as their own. No matter what the actual origin of the Unknown Soldier is, these nations have placed them within their imagined community.

== Nation as an imagined community ==
He defined a nation as "an imagined political community." As Anderson puts it, a nation "is imagined because the members of even the smallest nation will never know most of their fellow-members, meet them, or even hear of them, yet in the minds of each lives the image of their communion." Members of the community probably will never know each of the other members face to face; however, they may have similar interests or identify as part of the same nation. Members hold in their minds a mental image of their affinity. For example, the nationhood felt with other members of your nation when your "imagined community" participates in a larger event such as the Olympic Games.

Finally, a nation is a community because,

regardless of the actual inequality and exploitation that may prevail in each, the nation is always conceived as a deep, horizontal comradeship. Ultimately it is this fraternity that makes it possible, over the past two centuries, for so many millions of people, not so much to kill, as willingly to die for such limited imaginings.

== Context and influence ==
In the Chinese edition of Imagined Communities, Wu Rwei-Ren, the Chinese-language translator of Anderson's book, states in the preface that the immediate impetus for Benedict Anderson—who was born in a Western missionary family inside China, and had long engaged in the study of Southeast Asian affairs—to write this work, was the outbreak of the Third Indochina War in 1978–1979 among China, Vietnam, and Cambodia. In particular light of the event, the concerned Benedict Anderson had taken the time into historical, intellectual depth to ask himself: Why the power of nationalism could drive three Asian communist states, in the midst of the Cold War, to take up arms against one another on the battlefield in violent, bloody conflict.

Benedict Anderson arrived at his theory because he felt neither Marxist nor liberal theory adequately explained nationalism.

Anderson falls into the "historicist" or "modernist" school of nationalism along with Ernest Gellner and Eric Hobsbawm in that he posits that nations and nationalism are products of modernity and have been created as means to political and economic ends. This school opposes the primordialists, who believe that nations, if not nationalism, have existed since early human history. Imagined communities can be seen as a form of social constructionism on par with Edward Said's concept of imagined geographies.

In contrast to Gellner and Hobsbawm, Anderson is not hostile to the idea of nationalism, nor does he think that nationalism is obsolete in a globalizing world. Anderson values the utopian element in nationalism.

According to Harald Bauder, the concept of imagined communities remains highly relevant in a contemporary context of how nation-states frame and formulate their identities about domestic and foreign policy, such as policies towards immigrants and migration. According to Euan Hague, "Anderson's concept of nations being 'imagined communities' has become standard within books reviewing geographical thought".

Even though the term was coined to specifically describe nationalism, it is now used more broadly, almost blurring it with community of interest. For instance, it can be used to refer to a community based on sexual orientation, or awareness of global risk factors.

Benedict Anderson's concept of imagined communities has been utilized by some scholars to describe the formation and dynamics of supranational communities. Recent scholarly efforts have integrated Anderson's framework with Karl Deutsch's communication theory to argue that the Anglosphere can be conceptualized as an "Anglo imagined community," highlighting its shared cultural, linguistic, and communicative bonds despite being a non-contiguous region.

The term has been influential on other thinkers. British anthropologist Mark Lindley-Highfield of Ballumbie Castle describes ideas such as "the West", which are given agentive status as though they are homogeneous real things, as entity-concepts, where these entity-concepts can have different symbolic values attributed to them to those attributed to the individuals comprising the group, who on an individual basis might be perceived differently. Lindley-Highfield explains: "Thus the discourse flows at two levels: One at which ideological disembodied concepts are seen to compete and contest, that have an agency of their own and can have agency acted out against them; and another at which people are individuals and may be distinct from the concepts held about their broader society." This varies from Anderson's work in that the application of the term is from the outside, and in terms of the focus on the inherent contradiction between the divergent identities of the entity-concepts and those who would fall under them.

Music and culture also parts of a nation's identity. Canadian ethnomusicologist Jeffery van den Scott and Canadian sociologist Lisa-Jo van den Scott extended imagined community and developed the concept of "imagined engagement". They argue how Canadian composers have historically used indigenous musical cultures in an attempt to create a sense of national identity. Imagined engagement describes a one-sided interaction where one group imagines an engagement with an othered, often without the othered's participation or consent.

== See also ==
- Invented tradition
- Granfalloon
