= Print capitalism =

Political theory

Print capitalism is a theory coined by Benedict Anderson, underlying the concept of the nation being the product of imagined community, emerging through a common language and discourse generated through the use of the printing press. In tandem, it contends that print was proliferated through the emergence of, and participation in, the capitalist marketplace. Capitalist entrepreneurs printed their books and media in the vernacular (instead of exclusive script languages, such as Latin) in order to maximize circulation. As a result, readers speaking various local dialects became able to understand each other, and a common discourse emerged. Anderson argued that the first European nation-states were thus formed around their "national print-languages." The concept is explained in depth in his 1983 book Imagined Communities.

== Development of the modern nation-state ==
The printing press is widely credited for modern nationalism and the birth of the nation-state as the primary actors in political legitimacy. Soon after the invention of the Gutenberg-style printing press in 1454, literature such as the Bible was printed in vernaculars. The publication of the 95 Theses in 1517 sparked the Reformation, under which Europe went through 200 years of warfare that led to the gradual establishment of the nation-state as the powers that were dominant, over the previous dominance of the Roman Catholic Church. Print capitalism continues to influence the development of nationalism through the spread of the printing press.
