= Steven Grosby =

German-American priest and religion professor

Steven Elliot Grosby is Professor of Religion at Clemson University. His areas of research include the ancient Near East, the Hebrew Bible, the relation between religion and nationality, and Social and Political Philosophy.

== Selected publications ==
- Biblical Ideas of Nationality: Ancient and Modern (2002)
- Hans Freyer, Theory of Objective Mind: An Introduction to the Philosophy of Culture. Series in Continental Thought No. 25 (translation of Theorie des objektiven Geistes. Eine Einleitung in die Kulturphilosophie, 1923) (1998)
- Editor of two volumes of selected writings of Edward Shils, The Virtue of Civility (1997) and The Calling of Education (1997)
- Nationality and Nationalism—a four volume Reader, co-editor (2004)
- Nationalism: A Very Short Introduction Oxford University Press (2005) ISBN 0-19-284098-3

== Awards and honors ==
- Templeton Foundation Award

== Additional sources ==
- "Steven Grosby". Clemson University Department of Philosophy & Religion. 2012.
