= List of political parties in Afghanistan =

Political parties are banned in Afghanistan under the current Taliban government. Previously, the Islamic Republic of Afghanistan had a multi-party system in development with numerous political parties, in which no one party often had a chance of gaining power alone, and parties had to work with each other to form coalition governments. No political party was permitted to exist that advocated anything deemed to go against Islamic morality.

The Taliban movement took over the government by force in 2021, and has since ruled the country unopposed. In September 2022, Acting Deputy Minister of Justice Maulvi Abdul Karim stated that there is "no need" for political parties to be active. On 16 August 2023, the Taliban government formally banned all political parties in Afghanistan in a decree announced by Acting Justice Minister Abdul Hakim Haqqani, because according to them, there is no concept of political party in the Sharia and the political parties do not serve Afghanistan's interests.

== Major parties under the Islamic Republic of Afghanistan ==
All parties are now banned; the following is a list of major parties during the rule of the Islamic Republic of Afghanistan. The law governing the formation of political parties was promulgated in 2009, and required parties to have at least 10,000 members, (previously they had only needed 700 members).

Logo	Name	Leader	Position	Ideology	Wolesi Jirga seats	Meshrano Jirga seats
	Watan Party of Afghanistan; Hezb-e Watan-e Afganestan; Dari: حزب وطن افغانستان''; English: Homeland Party of Afghanistan	Mir Afghan Bawary	Centre-left	Afghan nationalism (Civic nationalism); Social democracy	0 / 250	0 / 102
	National United Party of Afghanistan; Hezb-e Muttahed-e Melli-ye Afghanistan; Dari: حزب متحد ملی افغانستان	Bahadur Ayubi	Left-wing	Democratic socialism Left-wing nationalism Secularism; Social democracy Socialist feminism Social egalitarianism	0 / 250	0 / 102
	Solidarity Party of Afghanistan; Hambastagi-ye Afghanistan; Dari: حزب همبستگی افغانستان	Dawood Razmak	Left-wing	Anti-imperialism; Democratic socialism Progressivism; Secularism; Social democracy Socialist feminism	0 / 250	0 / 102
N/A	Afghan Peace Movement	N/A	N/A	Pacifism; Left-wing nationalism Secularism; Socialism	0 / 250	0 / 102
	Hezb-e Islami Gulbuddin; Dari: حزب اسلامی گلبدین; English: Gulbuddin Islamic Party	Gulbuddin Hekmatyar	Right-wing	Anti-Wahhabism; Islamism; Pashtun Interests	0 / 250	0 / 102
	Hezb-i Islami Khalis; Pashto: حزب اسلامی خالص; English: Pure Islamic Party	Din Mohammad	N/A	Tribal Autonomy; Tribalism; Pashtunwali; Khogyani tribal interests	0 / 250	0 / 102
	Republican Party of Afghanistan; Hezb-e Jomhorikhahan-e Afghanistan; Persian: حزب جمهوریخواهان افغانستان	Adelah Bahram Nezami	Third Way	Legal egalitarianism Liberal feminism Progressivism; Radicalism; Republicanism; Secular liberalism Secular humanism Social democracy Social liberalism	0 / 250	0 / 102
	Jamiat-e-Islami (Afghanistan); Persian: جمعیت اسلامی افغانستان; English: Islamic Society	Salahuddin Rabbani	Centre	Islamism; Afghan nationalism Islamic democracy Republicanism; Communitarism; Moderate Progressivism; Afghan Tajik interests Anti-Communism; Anti-Sovietism; Anti-Islamic extremism Anti-Taliban	0 / 250	0 / 102
N/A	Islamic Movement of Afghanistan; Harakat-e Islami-yi Afghanistan; Dari: حرکت اسلامی افغانستان	Sayed Mohammad Ali Jawid	N/A	Islamism; Religious fundamentalism	0 / 250	0 / 102
N/A	Afghan Mellat Party; Afğān Mellat Gund; Pashto: افغان ټولنپال ولسواکیز ګوند	Stanagul Sherzad	Syncretic	Anti-communism; Neosocialism; Pashtun nationalism (Ethnolinguistic nationalism); Social fascism	0 / 250	0 / 102
	Hezbe Wahdat; Dari: حزب وحدت; English: Unity Party	Karim Khalili (alledged)	N/A	Traditionalism; Islamism; Hazara Minority Rights; Shia Islamism	0 / 250	0 / 102
Logo	Islamic Dawah Organisation of Afghanistan; Tanzim-e Da'wat-e Islami-ye Afghanistan; Pashto: د اسلامي دعوت تنظيم	Abdulrab Rasul Sayyaf	Right-wing	Islamism; Wahhabism; Conservatism; Pashtun and Tajik Interests; Anti-Shi'ism	0 / 250	0 / 102
	National Islamic Movement of Afghanistan; Junbish-i-Milli Islami Afghanistan; Dari: جنبش ملی اسلامی افغانستان	Abdul Rashid Dostum	Centre	Islamic liberalism Islamic socialism Minority rights Uzbek and Turkmen Interests; Secularism	0 / 250	0 / 102
N/A	National Rescue Front (Afghanistan)	N/A	N/A	Islamic traditionalism Islamism	0 / 250	0 / 102
N/A	Afghan Liberal Party	N/A	N/A	Liberalism; Secularism	0 / 250	0 / 102
N/A	Moderation Party of Afghanistan	N/A	N/A	Afghan nationalism	0 / 250	0 / 102
	Afghanistan Liberation Organization; Sāzmān-e Rehāyī-ye Āfġānistān; Dari: سازمان رهایی افغانستان	Faiz Ahmad	Far-left	Anti-revisionism; Communism; Marxism–Leninism; Maoism	0 / 250	0 / 102
	Communist (Maoist) Party of Afghanistan; Hizb-i Komunist (Ma'uist) Afğānistān; Dari: حزب کمونیست (مائوئیست) افغانستان	N/A	Far-left	Anti-imperialism; Communism; Marxism–Leninism–Maoism	0 / 250	0 / 102

== Minor parties under the Islamic Republic of Afghanistan ==
Logo	Name	Leader	Position	Ideology	Wolesi Jirga seats	Meshrano Jirga seats
N/A	Welfare Party of Afghanistan; Hizb-e-Refah e Afghanistan	N/A	N/A	Welfarism	0 / 250	0 / 102
	Basej-e Milli; Dari: بسيج ملی; English: National Movement	Amrullah Saleh	Centre	Afghan nationalism Atlanticism; Moderate Islamism; Democratism; Decentralization; Reformism; Republicanism; Anti-Taliban	0 / 250	0 / 102
N/A	Democratic Party of Afghanistan	N/A	N/A	Democracy	0 / 250	0 / 102
N/A	Afghanistan Coherence and Mutation Party; Majma e Haqiqat e Afghan	N/A	N/A	N/A	0 / 250	0 / 102
	National Congress Party of Afghanistan; Hezb-e-Congra-e-Mili Afghanistan; Persian: حزب کنگره ملی افغانستان	Abdul Latif Pedram	Centre	Federalism; Liberalism; Secularism	0 / 250	0 / 102
	National Islamic Front of Afghanistan Hezb-e-Mahaz-e-Milli Islami; Pashto: محاذ ملی اسلامی افغانستان	Hamed Gailani	Right-wing	Afghan nationalism Pashtun Interests; Royalism (formerly)	0 / 250	0 / 102
N/A	National Movement of Afghanistan; Hezb-e-Nuhzhat-e-Mili Afghanistan	Ahmad Wali Massoud	N/A	N/A	0 / 250	0 / 102
N/A	National Solidarity Movement of Afghanistan; Nahzat-e Hambastagi-ye Melli-ye Afghanistan; Dari: نهضت همبستگی ملی افغانستان	Sayed Ishaq Gailani	N/A	Monarchism	0 / 250	0 / 102
N/A	National Sovereignty Party; Hezb-e-Eqtedar-e-Mili	N/A	N/A	N/A	0 / 250	0 / 102
	National Solidarity Party of Afghanistan; Hezb-e-Paiwand Mili Afghanistan; Dari: حزب پيوند ملی افغانستان	Sayed Mansur Naderi	Centre	Ismaili Shia interests	0 / 250	0 / 102
N/A	New Afghanistan Party; Hezb-e Afghanistan Naween; Dari: حزب افغانستان نوین	Yunus Qanuni	N/A	N/A	0 / 250	0 / 102
	Pashtoons Social Democratic Party; De Pashtano Tolaneez Wolaswaleez Gwand; Pashto: د پښتنو ټولنیز ولسولیز ګوند	Ali Khan Masood	Centre-left	Greater Afghanistan; Pashtun nationalism (Left-wing nationalism); Progressivism; Secularism; Social democracy	0 / 250	0 / 102
N/A	People's Islamic Movement of Afghanistan Harakat-e Islami-yi	N/A	N/A	N/A	0 / 250	0 / 102
N/A	People's Party of Afghanistan; Hizb-e Mardum-e Afghanistan	N/A	N/A	Populism	0 / 250	0 / 102
N/A	Progressive Democratic Party of Afghanistan; Dari: حزب مترقی دموکرات افغانستان	Mohammad Wali Arya	Centre-left	Democratic socialism Labourism; Left-wing populism Progressivism; Secularism; Social democracy	0 / 102	
N/A	Truth and Justice; Hezb-e-Haq-wa-Edalat; Dari: حزب حق و عدالت	Hanif Atmar	Centre	Multi-Ethnic; Anti-Corruption; Reformism; Eurasianism	0 / 250	0 / 102
N/A	Unit Party	Shir Bazgar; Abdul Haq Holomi	N/A	Islamism	0 / 250	0 / 102
N/A	Youth Solidarity Party of Afghanistan; Hezb-e-Hambastagee Mili Jawanan	Doctor Fahim Tokhi	N/A	Youth rights	0 / 250	0 / 102
	Hezbollah Afghanistan; English: Party of God Afghanistan	Ahmad Ali Ghordarwazi	N/A	Afghan Shiite Minority Rights; Shia Islamism; Qutbism; Khomeinism	0 / 250	0 / 102

== Former parties ==
The following is a list of historical parties disestablished prior to the founding of the Islamic Republic. Since the coup in 1973, Afghanistan has had many different political parties. These include Mohammed Daoud Khan's National Revolutionary Party of Afghanistan, the People's Democratic Party and the Democratic Watan Party of Afghanistan from the communist era, and the Northern Alliance that took power after the Fall of Kabul in April 1992, and ran the country until the Taliban's coup in 1996.

English name	Ideology	Logo	Notes
Social Democratic Party of Afghanistan	Afghan nationalism Democratic socialism (Left-wing nationalism); Left-wing populism Progressivism; Radicalism; Republicanism; Secularism; Social democracy		
National Oppression	Anti-Pashtun sentiment Marxism-Leninism-Maoism; Minority rights (Tajik and Turkic interests); Secularism; Socialism		
National Revolutionary Party of Afghanistan	Afghan nationalism (State nationalism); Authoritarianism; Republicanism; Progressivism; Populism; Secularism		Party founded by first president Mohammad Daoud Khan. Only legal party under his rule. Ceased to exist after a bloody military coup by the communists in 1978.
Shola-e Javid	Anti-revisionism; Communism; Marxism–Leninism; Maoism		Banned in 1969 for opposing the Shah regime.
People's Democratic Party of Afghanistan	Afghan nationalism (Left-wing nationalism); Communism; Marxist-Leninism; Left-wing populism Progressivism; Revolutionary socialism Secularism; Stalinism		Communist party founded in 1965. Gained power in a 1978 coup, and was the dominant party of the Democratic Republic of Afghanistan from 1978 to 1990. Replaced by the Democratic Watan Party in 1990.
People's Solidarity Movement of Afghanistan (Feda'ian)	Socialism		
Liberation Organization of the People of Afghanistan	Communism; Maoism; Marxism-Leninism		
Democratic Homeland Party of Afghanistan	Afghan nationalism (Left-wing nationalism); Democratic socialism Islamic socialism Left-wing populism Progressivism; Social democracy		
Liberal Democratic Party of Afghanistan	Liberal democracy Pragmatism; Radicalism; Secular liberalism Social liberalism		

== See also ==
- List of political parties by country
