= Types of nationalism =

Among scholars of nationalism, a number of types of nationalism have been presented. Nationalism may manifest itself as part of an official state ideology or as a popular non-state movement and may be expressed along racial, civic, ethnic, linguistic, religious or ideological lines. These self-definitions of the nation are used to classify types of nationalism, but such categories are not mutually exclusive and many nationalist movements combine some or all of these elements to varying degrees. Nationalist movements can also be classified by other criteria, such as scale and location.

Some political theorists, like Umut Özkirimli, make the case that any distinction between forms of nationalism is false. In all forms of nationalism, the populations believe that they share some kind of common culture. Arguably, all types of nationalism merely refer to different ways academics throughout the years have tried to define nationalism. Similarly, Yael Tamir has argued that the differences between the oft-dichotomized ethnic and civic nationalism are blurred.

== Ethnic nationalism ==
Ethnic nationalism, also known as ethnonationalism, is a form of nationalism wherein the nation and nationality are defined in terms of ethnicity, with emphasis on an ethnocentric (and in some cases an ethnocratic) approach to various political issues related to national affirmation of a particular ethnic group.

The central tenet of ethnic nationalists is that "nations are defined by a shared heritage, which usually includes a common language, a common faith, and a common ethnic ancestry". Those of other ethnicities may be classified as second-class citizens.

Ethnic nationalism was traditionally the determinant type of nationalism in Eastern Europe.

=== Expansionist nationalism ===
Expansionist nationalism is an aggressive radical form of ethnic nationalism (ethnonationalism) that incorporates autonomous, heightened ethnic consciousness and patriotic sentiments with atavistic fears and hatreds focused on "other" or foreign peoples, framing a belief in expansion or recovery of formerly owned territories through militaristic means.

=== Racial nationalism ===
Racial nationalism is an ideology that advocates a racial definition of national identity. Racial nationalism seeks to preserve a given race through policies such as banning race mixing and the immigration of other races. Its ideas tend to be in direct conflict with those of anti-racism and multiculturalism. An example is white nationalism.

=== Romantic nationalism ===
Romantic nationalism, also known as organic nationalism and identity nationalism, is the form of ethnic nationalism in which the state derives political legitimacy as a natural ("organic") consequence and expression of the nation, race, or ethnicity. It reflected the ideals of Romanticism and was opposed to Enlightenment rationalism. Romantic nationalism emphasized a historical ethnic culture which meets the Romantic Ideal; folklore developed as a Romantic nationalist concept. The Brothers Grimm were inspired by Herder's writings to create an idealized collection of tales which they labeled as ethnically German. Historian Jules Michelet exemplifies French romantic-nationalist history.

=== Liberal ethnonationalism ===
Generally, "liberal nationalism" is used in a similar sense to "civic nationalism"; liberal nationalism is a kind of nationalism recently defended by political philosophers who believe that there can be a non-xenophobic form of nationalism compatible with liberal values of freedom, tolerance, equality, and individual rights. However, not all "liberal nationalism" is always "civic nationalism"; there are also liberals who advocate moderate nationalism that affirm ethnic identity, also referred to as "liberal ethnonationalism".

Xenophobic movements in long-established Western European states indeed often took a 'civic national' form, rejecting a given group's ability to assimilate with the nation due to its belonging to a cross-border community (ex. Irish Catholics in Britain, Ashkenazi Jews in France). On the other hand, while liberal subnational separatist movements were commonly associated with ethnic nationalism; such nationalists as the Corsican Republic, United Irishmen, Breton Federalist League or Catalan Republican Party could combine a rejection of the unitary civic-national state with a belief in liberal universalism.

During Taiwan's KMT one-party dictatorship, the Kuomintang (KMT) defended Chinese state nationalism. Opposing this, liberals and progressives such as anti-KMT Tangwai politicians or the Democratic Progressive Party (DPP) defended Taiwanese-based ethno-nationalism; emphasizing Hoklo-Identity and local-centered nativism. South Korea prioritized South Korean-based "state nationalism" (국가주의) over Korean ethnic nationalism during the right-wing dictatorship; in response, political liberals and leftists defended "liberal [ethnic] nationalism" (자유주의적 민족주의), a moderate version of Korean ethnic nationalism. Even today, major left-liberal and progressive nationalists in Taiwan and South Korea advocate anti-imperialistic liberal ethno-nationalism and are critical of right-wing state-nationalism (such as Republic of China nationalism and South Korean [state] nationalism). As countries that had experienced communist dictatorships in the past—including Eastern European countries like North Macedonia—underwent liberalization, they mobilized ethno-nationalism to oppose the authoritarian governments that had suppressed nationalism.

Liberal Zionism is an ideology that combines Zionism—an ethnocultural nationalist ideology—with secular liberal values. Liberal Zionists define Israel as a Jewish and democratic state and support two-state solution and equal rights to Arab citizens of Israel.

In 19th century Europe, liberal movements often affirmed ethnic nationalism in the modern sense along with to topple classical conservatism; István Széchenyi was a representative of liberal ethnic nationalism.

=== Left-wing ethnonationalism ===
While left-wing nationalism has a weaker ethnic nationalist component than right-wing nationalism, some national liberation movements have also combined with ethnic nationalism; Northeast Asia and Vietnam's "national liberation" (民族解放, Minzu jiefang) are representative.

== Civic nationalism ==
Civic nationalism, sometimes known as democratic nationalism and liberal nationalism, is a political identity built around shared citizenship within the state, with emphasis on political institutions and liberal principles, which its citizens pledge to uphold. It aims to adhere to traditional liberal values of freedom, tolerance, equality, and individual rights, and is not based on ethnocentrism. Civic nationalists often defend the value of national identity by arguing that individuals need it as a partial shared aspect of their identity to lead meaningful, autonomous lives and that democratic polities need a national identity to function properly.

Membership in the civic nation is open to every person by citizenship, regardless of culture or ethnicity; those who share these values can be considered members of the nation. In theory, a civic nation or state does not aim to promote one culture over another. German philosopher Jürgen Habermas has argued that immigrants to a liberal-democratic state need not assimilate into the host culture but only accept the principles of the country's constitution (constitutional patriotism).

Donald Ipperciel argues civic nationalism historically was a determining factor in the development of modern constitutional and democratic states. The 20th-century revival of civic nationalism played a key role in the ideological war against racism. However, as the Turkish political scientist Umut Özkirimli states, "civic" nations can be as intolerant and cruel as the so-called "ethnic" nations, citing French Jacobin techniques of persecution that were used by 20th-century fascists.

=== State nationalism ===
State nationalism, state-based nationalism, state-led nationalism, or "statism" (Chinese: 國家主義) equates 'state identity' with 'national identity' and values state authority. State nationalism is classified as civic nationalism by the dichotomy that divides nationalism into "civic" and "ethnic", but it is not necessarily liberal and has been present in authoritarian politics. Soviet nationalism, Shōwa Statism, Kemalism, Francoism, and Communist-led Chinese state nationalism are all classified as state nationalism.

== Ideological nationalism ==
=== Revolutionary nationalism ===
Revolutionary nationalism is a broad label that has been applied to many different types of nationalist political movements that wish to achieve their goals through a revolution against the established order. Individuals and organizations described as being revolutionary nationalist include some political currents within the French Revolution, Irish republicans engaged in armed struggle against the British crown, the Can Vuong movement against French rule in 19th century Vietnam, the Indian independence movement in the 20th century, some participants in the Mexican Revolution, Benito Mussolini and the Italian Fascists, the Autonomous Government of Khorasan, Augusto Cesar Sandino, the Revolutionary Nationalist Movement in Bolivia, black nationalism in the United States, and some African independence movements.

=== Liberation nationalism ===
Many nationalist movements in the world are dedicated to national liberation in the view that their nations are being persecuted by other nations and thus need to exercise self-determination by liberating themselves from the accused persecutors. Anti-revisionist Marxist–Leninism is closely tied with this ideology, and practical examples include Stalin's early work Marxism and the National Question and his Socialism in One Country edict, which declares that nationalism can be used in an internationalist context i.e. fighting for national liberation without racial or religious divisions.

=== Left-wing nationalism ===
Left-wing nationalism, also occasionally known as socialist nationalism, refers to any political movement that combines left-wing politics or socialism with nationalism. Notable examples include Fidel Castro's 26th of July Movement that launched the Cuban Revolution that ousted dictator Fulgencio Batista in 1959, Ireland's Sinn Féin, Labor Zionism in Israel, and the African National Congress in South Africa.

== Schools of anarchism which acknowledge nationalism ==
Anarchists who see value in nationalism typically argue that a nation is first and foremost a people; that the state is parasite upon the nation and should not be confused with it; and that since in reality states rarely coincide with national entities, the ideal of the nation state is actually little more than a myth. Within the European Union, for instance, they argue there are over 500 ethnic nations within the 25 member states, and even more in Asia, Africa, and the Americas. Moving from this position, they argue that the achievement of meaningful self-determination for all of the world's nations requires an anarchist political system based on local control, free federation, and mutual aid. There has been a long history of anarchist involvement with left-nationalism all over the world. Contemporary fusions of anarchism with anti-state left-nationalism include some strains of Black anarchism and indigenism.

In early to mid-19th-century Europe, the ideas of nationalism, liberalism, and socialism. were closely intertwined. Revolutionaries and radicals like Giuseppe Mazzini aligned with all three in about equal measure. The early pioneers of anarchism participated in the spirit of their times: they had much in common with both liberals and socialists, and they shared much of the outlook of early nationalism as well. Thus Mikhail Bakunin had a long career as a pan-Slavic nationalist before adopting anarchism. He also agitated for a United States of Europe (a contemporary nationalist vision originated by Mazzini). In 1880–1881, the Boston-based Irish nationalist W. G. H. Smart wrote articles for a magazine called The Anarchist. Similarly, anarchists in China during the early part of the 20th century were very much involved in the left wing of the nationalist movement while actively opposing racist elements of the anti-Manchu wing of that movement.

== Pan-nationalism ==
Pan-nationalism is usually an ethnic and cultural nationalism, but the 'nation' is itself a cluster of related ethnic groups and cultures, such as Slavic peoples. Occasionally pan-nationalism is applied to mono-ethnic nationalism, when the national group is dispersed over a wide area and several states – as in Pan-Germanism.

== Transnationalism ==
Transnationalism puts nations within an overarching concept, such as global citizenry, seeing shared overarching institutions, for example such as institutions for continental union or globalizing society.

== Religious nationalism ==
Religious nationalism is the relationship of nationalism to a particular religious belief, religious organization, or religious identity. This relationship can be broken down into two aspects; the politicization of religion and the converse influence of religion on politics. In the former aspect, a shared religion can be seen to contribute to a sense of national unity, by the citizens of the nation. Another political aspect of religion is the support of a national identity, similar to a shared ethnicity, language or culture. The influence of religion on politics is more ideological, where current interpretations of religious ideas inspire political activism and action; for example, laws are passed to foster stricter religious adherence. Hindu nationalism is common in many states and union territories in India which joined the union of India solely on the basis of religion and post-colonial nationalism.

== Post-colonial nationalism ==
Since the process of decolonisation that occurred after World War II, there has been a rise of Third World nationalisms (or nationalisms in less-developed states). Third world nationalisms occur in those nations that have been colonized and exploited. The nationalisms of these nations are the result of the required resistance made against colonial domination in order to survive. As such, resistance is part and parcel of such nationalisms and their very existence is a form of resistance to imperialist intrusions. Third World nationalism attempts to ensure that the identities of Third World peoples are authored primarily by themselves, not by colonial powers.

Examples of third world nationalist ideologies are African nationalism and Arab nationalism. Other important nationalist movements in the developing world have included the ideas of the Mexican Revolution and Haitian Revolution. Third world nationalist ideas have been particularly influential among governments elected in South America.

== Multi-ethnic nationalism ==
Multi-ethnic nationalism denotes ethnic nationalism in a multinational state.

By and large, Chinese nationalism has taken the form of a multi-ethnic nationalism (Zhonghua minzu). Some consider Chinese nationalism as distinct from civic nationalism or strict ethnic nationalism. Taiwanese nationalism is also considered multi-ethnic nationalism.

Multi-ethnic nationalism may be similar to civic nationalism. However, multi-ethnic nationalism tends to embrace multi-ethnic elements without embracing the core elements of civic nationalism.

== Diaspora nationalism ==
Diaspora nationalism, or as Benedict Anderson terms it, "long-distance nationalism", generally refers to nationalist feeling among a diaspora such as the Irish in the United States, Jews around the world after the expulsion from Jerusalem (586 BCE), the Lebanese in the Americas and Africa, or Armenians in Europe and the United States. Anderson states that this sort of nationalism acts as a "phantom bedrock" for people who want to experience a national connection, but who do not actually want to leave their diaspora community. The essential difference between pan-nationalism and diaspora nationalism is that members of a diaspora, by definition, are no longer resident in their national or ethnic homeland. In some instances, 'Diaspora' refers to a dispersal of a people from a (real or imagined) 'homeland' due to a cataclysmic disruption, such as war, famine, etc. New networks – new 'roots' – form along the 'routes' travelled by diasporic people, who are connected by a shared desire to return 'home'. In reality, the desire to return may be eschatological (i.e. end times orientation), or may not occur in any foreseeable future, but the longing for the lost homeland and the sense of difference from circumambient cultures in which diasporic people live becomes an identity unto itself.

== Language nationalism ==
Language nationalism is a nationalism that defends and promotes a language of a nation. Language nationalists in many cases campaign for the national language to be made the official language.

== See also ==
- Anti-nationalism
- Buddhist nationalism
- Christian nationalism
- Hindu nationalism
- Integral nationalism
- Islamic nationalism
- Jewish nationalism
- Jingoism
- Postnationalism
- Zionism
