= Civic nationalism =

Form of nationalism

Civic nationalism, otherwise known as democratic nationalism, is a form of nationalism that adheres to traditional liberal values of freedom, tolerance, equality, and individual rights, and is not based on ethnocentrism. Civic nationalists often defend the value of national identity by saying that individuals need it as a partial shared aspect of their identity (an upper identity) in order to lead meaningful, autonomous lives, and that democratic polities need a national identity to function properly. Liberal nationalism is used in the same sense as "civic nationalism", but liberal ethnonationalism also exists, and "state nationalism" is a branch of civic nationalism, but it can also be illiberal.

Civic nationhood is a political identity built around shared citizenship within the state. Thus, a "civic nation" defines itself not by culture but by political institutions and liberal principles, which its citizens pledge to uphold. Membership in the civic nation is open to every person by citizenship, regardless of culture or ethnicity. Those who share these values are considered members of the nation and, in theory, a civic nation or state does not aim to promote one culture over another. German philosopher Jürgen Habermas has argued that immigrants to a liberal-democratic state need not assimilate into the host culture but only accept the principles of the country's constitution (constitutional patriotism).

Civic nationalism is frequently contrasted with ethnic nationalism. According to Donald Ipperciel, civic nationalism historically was a determining factor in the development of modern constitutional and democratic forms of government, whereas ethnic nationalism has been more associated with authoritarian rule and even dictatorship. Indeed, the 20th-century revival of civic nationalism played a key role in the ideological effort against racism. However, as Umut Özkırımlı states, "civic" nations can be as intolerant and cruel as the so-called "ethnic" nations, citing French Jacobin techniques of persecution that were utilized by 20th-century fascists. Some argue civic nationalism inevitably involves an underlying ethnic concept of national belonging because abstract values cannot be related to a specific place.

== History ==
Civic nationalism lies within the traditions of rationalism and liberalism, but as a form of nationalism it is contrasted with ethnic nationalism. Ernest Renan is often thought to be an early civic nationalist. Philosopher Hans Kohn was one of the first to differentiate civic nationalism from ethnic nationalism in his 1944 publication The Idea of Nationalism: A Study in Its Origins and Background. Membership of the civic nation is considered voluntary, as in Renan's classical definition in "Qu'est-ce qu'une nation?" of the nation as a "daily referendum" characterized by the "will to live together". Some authors criticize that definition used by Renan, based on a "daily referendum", because of the ambiguity of the concept and its idealization. They argue that the arguments used by Renan at the conference "What is a Nation?" are not consistent with his thinking. Civic-national ideals influenced the development of representative democracy in countries such as the United States and France (see the United States Declaration of Independence of 1776, and the Declaration of the Rights of Man and of the Citizen of 1789).

The Corsican nationalist movement organized around the FLNC is giving a civic definition of the Corsican nation ("destiny community") in the continuity of Pasquale Paoli and the ideas of the Lumières. The Scottish National Party, as well as Plaid Cymru, which advocate independence of their respective nations from the United Kingdom, proclaim themselves to be civic nationalist parties, in which they advocate the independence and popular sovereignty of the people living in their nation's society, not individual ethnic groups. The Republican Left of Catalonia supports a civic Catalan independentism and defends a Catalan Republic based on republicanism and civic values within a diverse society.

The Union of Cypriots define its ideology as Cypriot nationalism, a civic nationalism that focuses on the shared identity of Greek Cypriots and Turkish Cypriots. It highlights both communities' common culture, heritage and traditions as well as economic, political, and social rights. It also supports the reunification of Cyprus and the end of foreign interference by Greece, Turkey, and the United Kingdom. Moldovan diplomat Mihai Gribincea described the Party of Action and Solidarity (PAS) as promoting a "civic Moldovan nation". Outside Europe, it has also been used to describe the Republican Party in the United States during the Civil War Era. Civic nationalism shares elements of the Swiss concept of Willensnation, which is German for "nation by will", coined by Carl Hilty, understood as shared experience and dedication by citizens.

== Criticism ==
Former Israeli minister Yael Tamir has argued that the differences between ethnic and civic nationalism are blurred. She posits: "By waving the civic flag, Western democracies pretend to be more peaceful and inclusive than they really are, fostering a self-image that allows them to exonerate themselves, leaving them unprepared to deal with internal conflicts". The distinction between ethnic and civic nationalism has also been criticized by scholars like Bernard Yack and Umut Özkırımlı. Yack rejects Renan's notion of "voluntary" civic nationality as an illusion, arguing this "misrepresents political reality as surely as the ethnonationalist myths it is designed to combat", going on to state how cultural memories form an inseparable part of every national political identity. Quoting Rogers Brubaker, Özkırımlı argues:

Since all nations lay claim to a unique place in history and to certain boundaries, all national identities are exclusionary. In that sense, all nations are ethnic nations [...] Brubaker elaborates on this, claiming that there are two different ways of mapping culture onto the ethnic-civic distinction. Ethnic nationalism may be interpreted narrowly, as involving an emphasis on descent. In this case, Brubaker argues, there is very little ethnic nationalism around, since on this view an emphasis on common culture has to be coded as a species of civic nationalism. If, however, ethnic nationalism is interpreted broadly, as ethnocultural, while civic nationalism is interpreted narrowly, as involving a cultural conception of citizenship, the problem is the opposite: 'civic nationalism gets defined out of existence, and virtually all nationalisms would be coded as ethnic or cultural'. Even the paradigmatic cases of civic nationalism, France and America, would cease to count as civic nationalism, since they have a crucial cultural component.

— Umut Özkırımlı, Contemporary Debates on Nationalism: A Critical Engagement, pp.24-5

Following Brubaker, John Etherington demonstrates how civic nationalism inevitably involves an underlying ethnic concept of national belonging. Because supposed civic values are abstract, universal and thus open to all, "they cannot be related to a specific place – the national homeland. Thus, any civic conception of the nation is dependent on a prior ethnic conception because of the need to establish who belongs to the nation and its homeland and who does not".

== See also ==
- Americanism (ideology)
- Bourgeois nationalism
- Civic virtue
- Composite nationalism
- Constitutional patriotism
- Cultural nationalism
- Imagined community
- Nation-building
- National liberalism
- Plurinationalism
- Postcolonial anarchism

== Sources ==
- Tournier-Sol, Karine (2015). "Reworking the Eurosceptic and Conservative Traditions into a Populist Narrative: UKIP's Winning Formula?". Journal of Common Market Studies. 53 (1): 140–56. doi:10.1111/jcms.12208. S2CID 142738345.
