= Postnationalism =

Decreased importance of nation-states

Postnationalism or non-nationalism is the process or trend by which nation states and national identities lose their importance relative to cross-national, self-organized, or supranational and global entities as well as local entities. Although postnationalism is not strictly considered the antonym of nationalism, the two terms and their associated assumptions are antithetic as postnationalism is an internationalistic process. There are several factors that contribute to aspects of postnationalism, including economic, political, and cultural elements. The increasing globalization of economic factors, such as the expansion of international trade in raw materials, manufactured goods, and services, and the growing importance of multinational corporations and internationalization of financial markets, have led to a shift in emphasis from national economies to global ones.

At the same time, socio-political power is partially transferred from national authorities to supernational entities, such as multinational corporations, the United Nations, the European Union, the North American Free Trade Agreement (NAFTA), and NATO. Furthermore, media and entertainment industries are becoming increasingly global, thereby facilitating the formation of trends and opinions on a supranational scale. The migration of individuals or groups between countries contributes to the formation of postnational identities and beliefs. However, attachment to citizenship and national identities often remains important.

== Postnationalism and human rights ==
In the scholarly literature, postnationalism is linked to the expansion of international human rights law and norms. International human rights norms are reflected in a growing stress on the rights of individuals in terms of their "personhood," not just their citizenship. International human rights law does not recognize the right of entry to any state by non-citizens, but demands that individuals should be judged increasingly on universal criteria not particularistic criteria (such as blood descent in ethnicity, or favoring a particular sex). This has impacted citizenship and immigration law, especially in western countries. The German parliament, for example, has felt pressure to, and has diluted (if not eradicated), citizenship based on ethnic descent, which had caused German-born Turks, for example, to be excluded from German citizenship. Scholars identified with this argument include Yasemin Soysal, David Jacobson, and Saskia Sassen.

== In the European Union ==
European integration has created a system of supranational entities and is often discussed in relationship to the concept of postnationalism.

== In Canada ==
In June 2000, Liberal Prime Minister Jean Chrétien described Canada as a post-national state in a speech. During the 2011 election, John Ibbitson argued that in the fading influence of the "Laurentian Consensus" was responsible for turning Canada into the first post-national state. In 2015, Canadian Prime Minister Justin Trudeau, while defining Canadian values, suggested his country could be considered the world’s first post-national state.

Writing in Macleans in 2018, Scott Gilmore felt like Canada bypassed building the "national" stage when talking about post nationalism. In opposition to the perceived shift toward post-nationalism in Canada, John Weissenberger writing in the National Post has argued that it is the Laurentian elite themselves who have "diluted the 'Laurentian' nature of the class and boosted their disdain for national character." In 2024, Max Fawcett writing in Canada's National Obsever defended post nationalism against critics and has suggested that Justin Trudeau's comments was trying to build on the work of his father Pierre Elliot Trudeau.

== In the media ==
Catherine Frost, professor of political science at McMaster University, argues that while the Internet and online social relations forge social and political bonds across national borders, they do not have "the commitment or cohesiveness needed to underpin a demanding new mode of social and political relations". Nonetheless, it has been argued the increasing options of obtaining virtual citizenship from established nations (e.g., E-Residency of Estonia) and micronations can be seen as examples of what citizenship might look like in a post-national world.

== In sports ==
Postnational trends have been evident in professional sports. Simon Kuper called the 2008 European soccer championship (UEFA Euro 2008) "the first postnational" European Championship. He argues that during the tournament both for players and fans sportsmanship and enjoyment of the event were more important than national rivalries or even winning.

== See also ==
- Anti-globalization movement
- Civic nationalism
- Constitutional patriotism
- Digital currency
- Global citizenship
- Identity politics
- Post-Zionism
- Transnationalism
- Tribe (Internet)
- Types of nationalism
- World Wide Web

== Bibliography ==
- Bennett, David (1998), Multicultural States: Rethinking Difference and Identity, Psychology Press, p. 305, ISBN 0415121590
- Breen, Keith; O'Neill, Shane (2010). After the Nation? Critical Reflections on Nationalism and Postnationalism. London: Palgrave Macmillan. doi:10.1057/9780230293175. ISBN 978-0-230-57653-7.
- Maronitis, Kostas (2020). "Postnationalism". The Blackwell Encyclopedia of Sociology. John Wiley & Sons. pp. 1–2. doi:10.1002/9781405165518.wbeosp072.pub2. ISBN 978-1-4051-2433-1.
- Wickham, Gary (2021). "Post-nationalism, sovereignty and the state". Journal of Sociology. 57 (1): 47–58. doi:10.1177/1440783321993535.
