= Advisory Commission of National and Democratic Parties =

Alliance of political parties in Afghanistan

Advisory Commission of National and Democratic Parties (Persian: کمیسیون مشورتی احزاب ملی و دموکراتیک) was an alliance of political parties in Afghanistan, founded in October 2004. The provisional spokesperson of the AC-NDP was Zulfeqar Khan Omid.

Members of AC-NDP were:

- Youth National Solidarity Party of Afghanistan (Jamil Karzai)
- Republican Party of Afghanistan (Sebghatullah Sanjar))
- Labour and Development Party of Afghanistan (Zulfeqar Khan Omid)
- People's Welfare Party of Afghanistan (Mia Gul Wasiq
- National Solidarity Party of the Tribes of Afghanistan (Muhammad Zarif Naseri)
- De Milli Yauwalai Gund (Abdul Rashid Jalili)
- Islamic Organisation "Young Afghanistan" (Seyyed Jawad Hossaini)
- People's Aspiration Party of Afghanistan (Serajuddin Zaffari)
- Understanding and Democracy Party of Afghanistan (Ahmad Shahin)
- National Progress Party of Afghanistan (Asef Baktash
- People's Felicity Party of Afghanistan (Muhammad Zubair Piruz)
- Liberal Party of Afghanistan (Ajmal Sohail)
- Solidarity Party of Afghanistan (Abdul Khaleq Nemat)
- Freedom and Democracy Movement of Afghanistan (Abdul Raqib Jawed Kohestani)
- People's Freedom Party of Afghanistan (Feda Muhammad Ehsas).
- People's Message Party (Nur Aqa Ru'in)
- United Afghanistan Party (Muhammad Wasel Rahimi)

The latter two joined the AC-NDP at a later stage.
