= The Idea of Nationalism: A Study in Its Origins and Background =

1944 book by Hans Kohn

- Author: Hans Kohn
- Language: English
- Subject: Nationalism
- Publisher: Macmillan Publishers
- Publication date: 1944
- Publication place: US
- Pages: 735
- ISBN: 978-1412804769

The Idea of Nationalism: A Study in Its Origins and Background is a 1944 book written by American philosopher Hans Kohn, one of the first modern writers about nationalism. It is considered a classic text in political science. In 2005, it was republished as a paperback with a foreword by Craig Calhoun.

== Contents ==
The Idea of Nationalism has eight chapters, each of which covers an epoch of European history. The evolution of different conceptions of nationalism were explored in Jewish and Greek antiquity, Rome, the Middle Ages, the Renaissance, the Reformation, and "the age of nationalism". He also establishes what is now known as the "Kohn Dichotomy" of nationalism, distinguishing between Western European civic nationalism and non-Western ethnic nationalism. The five Western states examined by Kohn were the Netherlands, Great Britain, Switzerland, the United States, and France.

== Reception ==
Polish-American historian Salo Wittmayer Baron called it a "stupendous achievement" in his 1944 review, and Heinz H. F. Eulau called it Kohn's magnum opus. After its republication in 1966, Athena S. Leoussi noted that it had acquired an "almost mythical" status, and was often cited in anthologies and secondary literature. Kohn's dichotomy of nationalism was widely adopted by subsequent scholars, including Ernest Gellner and Michael Ignatieff.
