= Ethnic nationalism =

Ethnic identity-based political ideology

Ethnic nationalism, also known as ethnonationalism, is a form of nationalism in which the nation and nationality are defined in terms of ethnicity, with emphasis on an ethnocentric (and in some cases an ethnostate/ethnocratic) approach to various political issues related to national affirmation of a particular ethnic group. Ethnic nationalism is widespread globally. Many states incorporate elements of ethnic nationalism into their citizenship and immigration policies, including preferential treatment or expedited citizenship for members of the dominant ethnic group or for co-ethnics living abroad.

The central tenet of ethnic nationalists is that "nations are defined by a shared heritage, which usually includes a common language, a common faith, and a common ethnic ancestry". Those of other ethnicities may be classified as second-class citizens. Because of these attributes, ethnic nationalism is closely related to nativism, and is associated with the radical right, but in the case of some separatist, anti-imperialist, or liberal ethno-nationalism, these attributes may be less pronounced, except for the emphasis on ethnicity.

Scholars of diaspora studies broaden the concept of "nation" to diasporic communities. The terms "ethnonation" and "ethnonationalism" are sometimes used to describe a conceptual collective of dispersed ethnics. Defining an ethnos widely can lead to ethnic nationalism becoming a form of pan-nationalism or macronationalism, as in cases such as pan-Germanism or pan-Slavism.

In scholarly literature, following a theoretical distinction by Hans Kohn, ethnic nationalism is usually contrasted with civic nationalism, although this distinction has also been criticized. Civic and ethnic nationalism are idealized categories; many states combine elements of both.

== History ==
Greece gained independence from the Ottoman Empire in 1830, followed by the unification of Italy and Germany in the 1860s and 1870s. The Balkan Wars, World War I, and the subsequent collapse of the Ottoman, Austro-Hungarian, and Russian empires accelerated ethnic disaggregation through migration, population transfers, forced expulsions, and genocide. The study of ethnonationalism emerged in the early 20th century in the interwar period between World War I and World War II, with the "redrawing of the political map of Europe in part along ethnic and national lines according to a proclaimed "right of peoples" to self-determination and the rise of fascist ethnocentric ideologies (including Nazism). Philosopher Hans Kohn was one of the first to differentiate ethnic nationalism from civic nationalism in his 1944 publication The Idea of Nationalism: A Study in Its Origins and Background.

During the Cold War, the independence movement initiated in former European colonies in Asia and Africa reinvigorated research into ethnic, tribal and national identities and the "political difficulties" stemming from their interactions with territorial statehood, while the collapse of the Soviet Union in the 1980s and 1990s and the "resurgence of ethnic and national claims and conflicts in its aftermath" only further spurred ethnonationalism scholarship in the late 20th century.

Increased international migration as a function of contemporary globalization has also given rise to "ethno-national" movements, including reactionary "nativist" groups focused on exclusionary identity politics. In the developed world, such trends have in some cases taken on an explicitly xenophobic and racist character, as seen in the example of "white nationalism" in the United States.

== Characteristics ==
The central political tenet of ethnic nationalism is that ethnic groups are entitled to self-determination. The outcome of this right to self-determination may vary, from calls for self-regulated administrative bodies within an already established society, to an autonomous entity separate from that society, to the institution of ethnic federalism within a multi-ethnic society, to establishing an independent sovereign state removed from that society. In international relations, it also leads to policies and movements for irredentism to claim a common nation based upon ethnicity, or for the establishment of an ethnocratic (mono-ethnocratic or poly-ethnocratic) political structure in which the state apparatus is controlled by a politically and militarily dominant ethnic nationalist group or a group of several ethnic nationalist groups from select ethnicities to further its interests, power and resources.

In scholarly literature, ethnic nationalism is usually contrasted with civic nationalism. Ethnic nationalism bases membership of the nation on descent or heredity, often articulated in terms of common blood or kinship, rather than on political membership. Hence, nation states with strong traditions of ethnic nationalism tend to define nationality or citizenship by jus sanguinis (the law of blood, descent from a person of that nationality), and countries with strong traditions of civic nationalism tend to define nationality or citizenship by jus soli (the law of soil, birth within the nation state). Ethnic nationalism is, therefore, seen as exclusive, while civic nationalism tends to be inclusive. Rather than allegiance to common civic ideals and cultural traditions, then, ethnic nationalism tends to emphasise narratives of common descent.

Recent theories and empirical data suggest that people maintain dual lay beliefs about nationality, such that it can be both inherited biologically at birth and acquired culturally in life.

=== Role in discrimination ===
In 2018, Tendayi Achiume, a UN Special Rapporteur on racism, released a UN Human Rights Council report which states that "more than 75% of the world's known stateless populations belong to minority groups" and highlights the role of ethnonationalism in the international deprivation of citizenship rights. In the report, Achiume re-stated that international human rights law prohibits citizens from discriminating against non-citizens on the basis of their race, descent, national or ethnic origin and she also stated that citizenship, nationality, and immigration laws which discriminate against non-citizens are violations of international law. She also noted the role of laws restricting marriage rights with respect to certain national, religious, ethnic or racial groups, which she said were "often deployed by states to preserve notions of national, ethnic and racial "purity"." Achiume called ethnonationalist politics the "most obvious driver of racial discrimination in citizenship and immigration laws" and driven by populist leaders defining nations "in terms of assumed blood ties and ethnicity".

In the 19th and 20th centuries, European colonial powers used ethnonationalism to justify barring colonial subjects from citizenship, and in Europe, Jews and Roma were excluded from citizenship on the same grounds. Today, migrants are a frequent target of ethnonationalist rhetoric related to "ethnic purity and religious, cultural or linguistic preservation". Even countries with proud histories of immigration have fallen prey to the vilification of "certain racial, religious and national groups" on prejudicial grounds. Achiume called the case of the Rohingya Muslims a "chilling example", with the Burma Citizenship Act of 1982 discriminating based on ethnicity and rendering many Rohingya stateless. The violation of the rights of Afro-Caribbean British citizens from the "Windrush generation" is a pertinent example of similar prejudice in the developed world but states all over the world use misinformation to portray "certain racial, national and religious groups as inherent threats to national security" and justify stripping or denying rights.

Extreme forms of ethnic nationalism, as in the case of Myanmar and its government's persecution of the Rohingya, have been identified as causes of various genocides and episodes of ethnic cleansing. In his 2005 book The Great Game of Genocide, historian Donald Bloxham argued that the Armenian genocide "represents a clear logic of ethnic nationalism when it is carried to its absolute extreme in multinational societies."

== Other nationalist variants ==
=== Liberal Ethno-nationalism ===
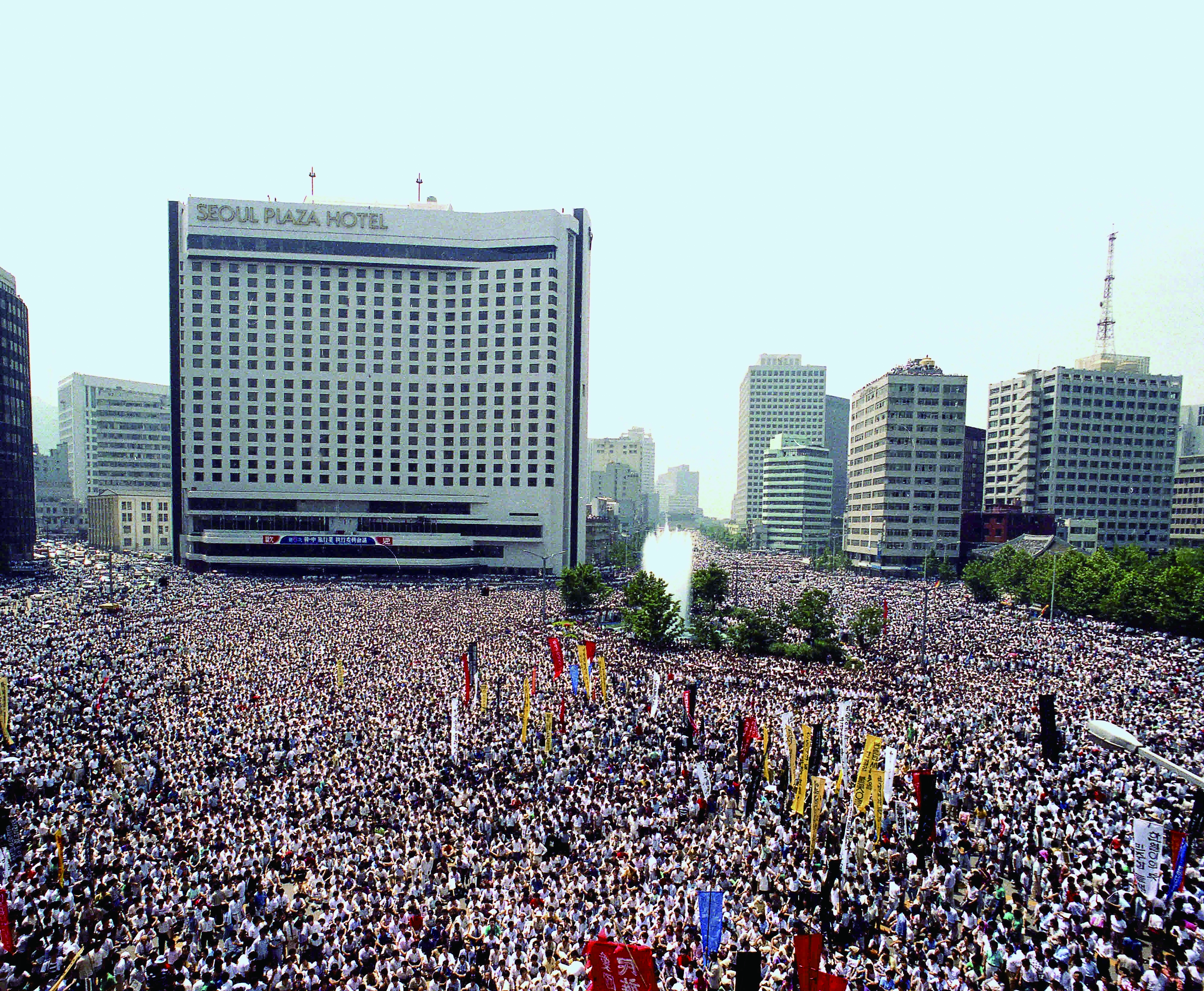
Popular Korean ethnic nationalism (민중민족주의; "minjung nationalism") emerged in the 1980s in South Korea as a pro-democracy movement opposing the anti-communist state-nationalist (국가주의) dictatorship and led to the June Struggle.

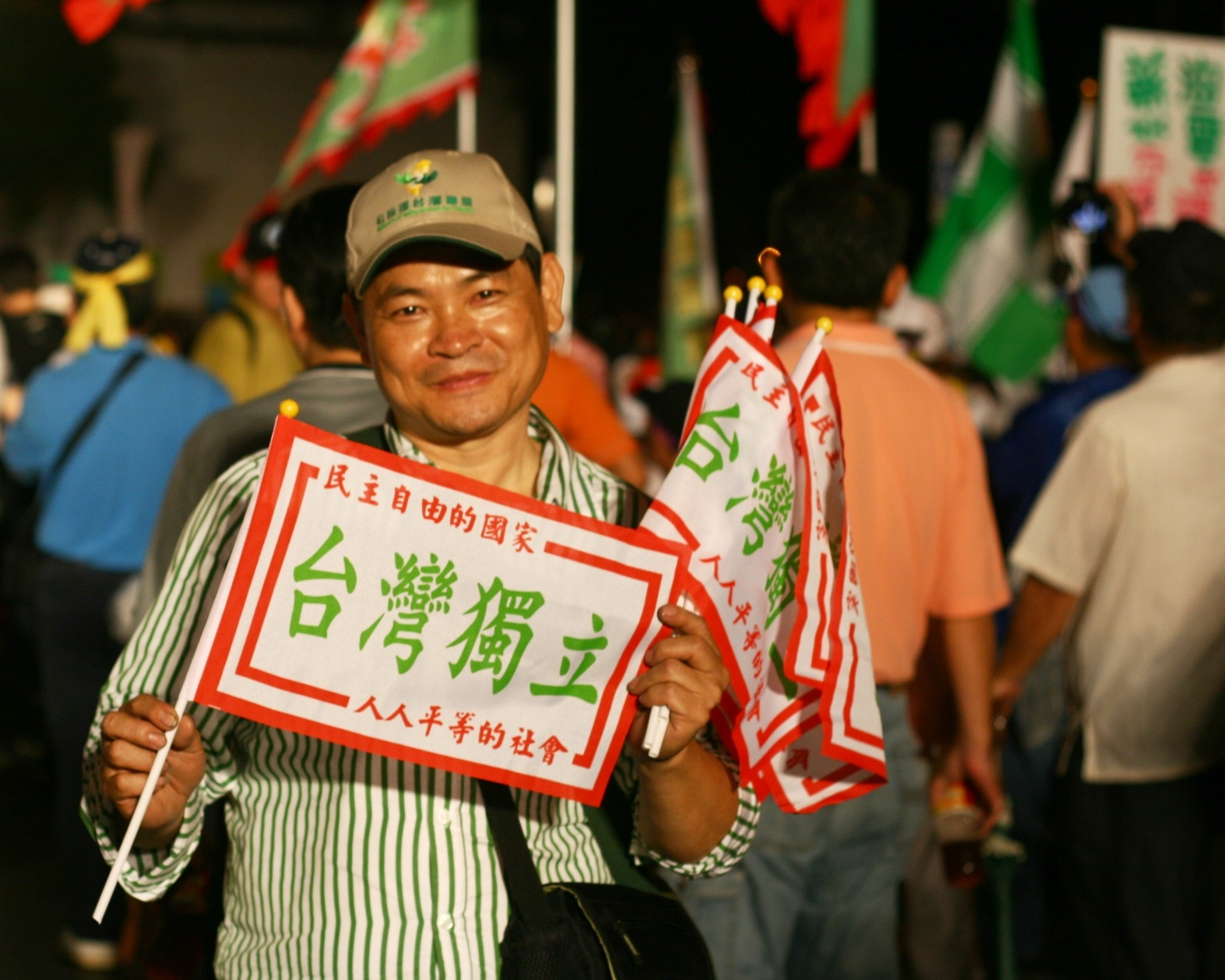
Taiwanese nationalist and independence movement slogan: "a liberal democratic country and equal society"

Generally, "liberal nationalism" is used in a similar sense to "civic nationalism"; liberal nationalism is a kind of nationalism recently defended by political philosophers who believe that there can be a non-xenophobic form of nationalism compatible with liberal values of freedom, tolerance, equality, and individual rights. However, not all "liberal nationalism" is always "civic nationalism"; there are also liberals who advocate moderate nationalism that affirm ethnic identity, also referred to as "liberal ethnonationalism". Ethnic nationalism is generally considered to be more related to dictatorship, but in some areas ethnic nationalism has rather become the main driving force to promote democratization against the state nationalist (which can function as a form of civic nationalist) dictatorship.

In 19th century Europe, liberal movements often affirmed ethnic nationalism in the modern sense along with to topple classical conservatism; István Széchenyi was a representative of liberal ethnic nationalism. Liberal Zionism is an ideology that combines Zionism—an ethnocultural nationalist ideology—with secular liberal values. In some regions, including South Korea, Taiwan, etc., there is a liberal/progressive ethno-nationalism tradition against conservative state-nationalism.

In Austria before Anschluss, pan-German Völkisch nationalism was widely accepted among national-liberals to fight Catholic-based conservative Austrian nationalism. As countries that had experienced communist dictatorships in the past—including Eastern European countries like North Macedonia—underwent liberalization, they mobilized ethno-nationalism to oppose the authoritarian governments that had suppressed nationalism.

=== Social Ethno-nationalism ===
Social Ethno-nationalism is a doctrine aimed at promoting social progress while defending the ethnic interests of different peoples, both emancipation and supremacy. For example, the Australian Labor Party had a strong white nationalist component and has openly supported the White Australia policy in the past.

Secular Arab nationalism advocated by Baathism and previously by Nasserism defends Arab socialism. There are also examples of leftist American black nationalism, including Black power movement. South American indigenous groups also have as their basis the defense of the ethnic interests of Amerindians while promoting social progress and the sharing of wealth.

=== Stateless and Anti-imperial nationalism ===
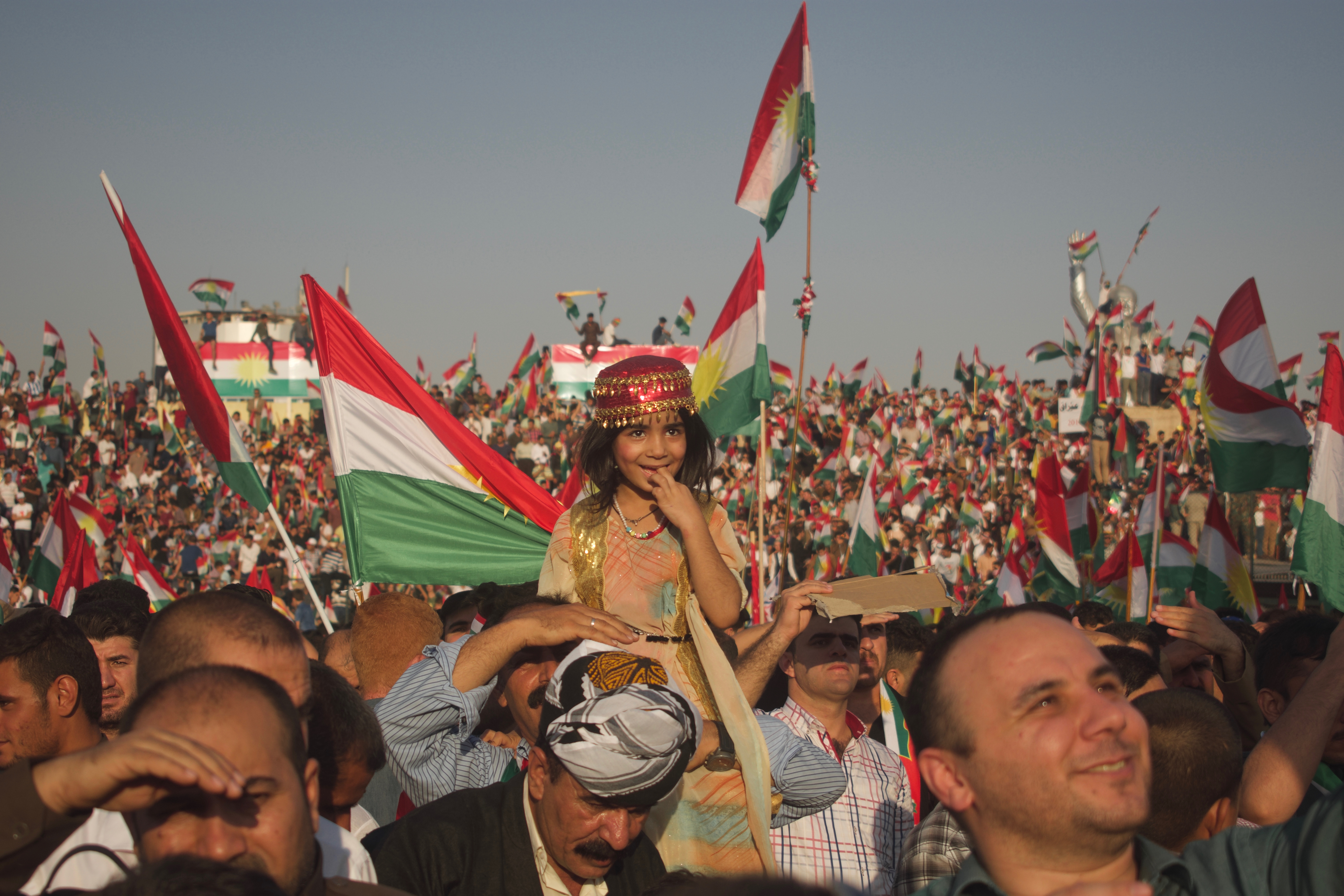
Pro-independence rally in Erbil, Kurdistan Region, September 2017

Stateless nationalism is frequently categorized as a variant of ethnic nationalism, as it primarily arises from minority or oppressed ethnic groups seeking self-determination or separatism within multi-national states. Unlike the nationalism of established states, which may use ethnicity for exclusion, stateless nationalism often functions as a mechanism for cultural preservation and political liberation.

During the era of New Imperialism, many decolonization movements in Asia and Africa adopted ethno-nationalist frameworks to mobilize populations against colonial powers. In many contemporary contexts, anti-imperialist movements continue to employ ethnic nationalism as a defensive response to "imperial" states that often mask their dominance under the guise of civic nationalism. For example, movements in Kurdistan, Tibet, and among Indigenous peoples often define their national identity through shared lineage and language to resist forced cultural assimilation by a dominant state apparatus.

== Contemporary examples ==
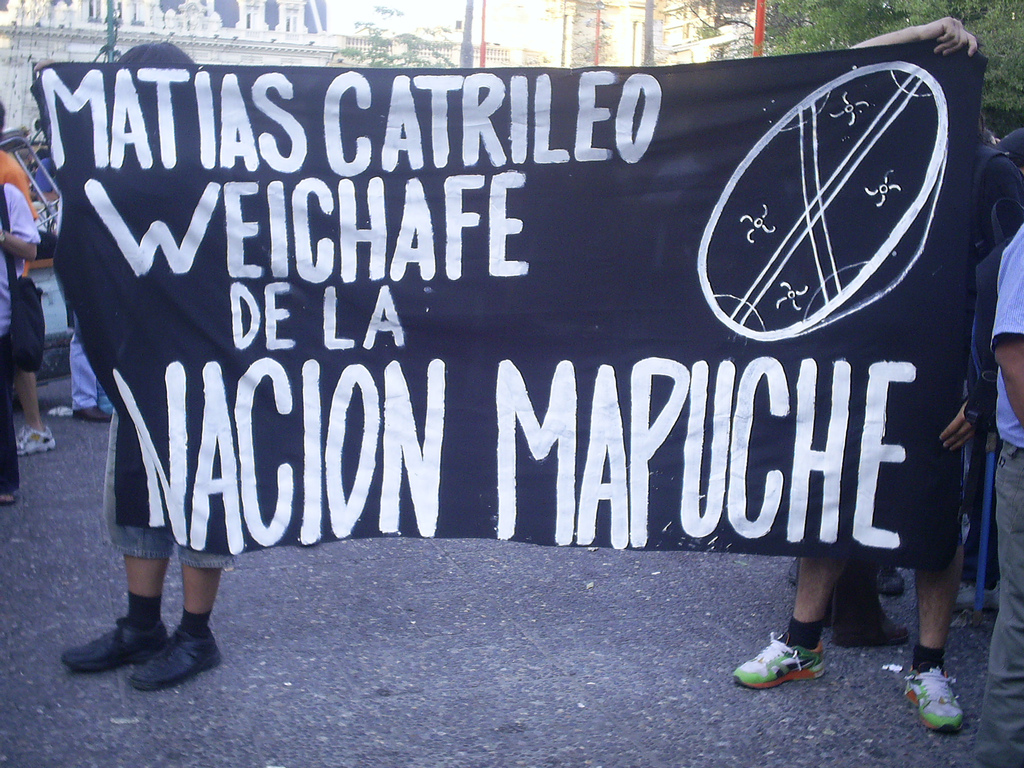
In the context of the Mapuche conflict, the Coordinadora Arauco-Malleco (CAM) presents a strictly ethno-nationalist demand.

Ethnic nationalism is present in many states' immigration policies in the form of repatriation laws. Armenia, Bosnia and Herzegovina, Bulgaria, Croatia, Finland, Germany, Hungary, Ireland, Israel, Serbia and Turkey provide automatic or rapid citizenship to members of diasporas of their predominant ethnic group, if desired.

=== Turkey ===
Turkey is described as an ethnocracy by multiple scholars. Nationalism has functioned as a dominant ideological framework in Turkey, enabling the marginalization of three officially recognized non-Muslim minorities—the Greeks, Armenians, and Jews—as well as the assimilation, colonial subjugation, and at times ethnic cleansing of non-Turkish Muslim groups.

According to Article 66 of the Turkish Constitution, "everyone bound to the Turkish state through the bond of citizenship is a Turk." According to the constitution, there are no minority rights since all citizens are Turks. This constitutional article ignores ethnic and religious minority rights. Although the Treaty of Lausanne guarantees some rights to non-Muslim minorities, in practice Turkey recognizes only Armenians, Greeks and Jews as minorities and excludes other non-Muslim groups.

Bilge Azgın points to government policies whose goals are the "exclusion, marginalization, or assimilation" of minority groups that are non-Turkish as the defining elements of Turkish ethnocracy. Jack Fong describes Turkey's policy of referring to its Kurdish minority as "mountain Turks" and its refusal to acknowledge any separate Kurdish identity as elements of the Turkish ethnocracy.

=== Azerbaijan ===
Flag of Azerbaijan

Since 1918, political elites with pan-Turkist-oriented sentiments in Azerbaijan have depended on the concept of ethnic nationalism to create an anti-Iranian sense of ethnicity among Iranian Azerbaijanis. While Azerbaijani President Ilham Aliyev has attempted to dismiss claims that his government is taking any anti-Iranian ethnic nationalist positions, the Iranian government and groups like Iranian nationalist circles, especially Iranian Azerbaijanis, are dubious about the intentions of the Azerbaijani government due to the ongoing actions of irredentist elements like Congress of World Azerbaijanis or Southern Azerbaijan National Awakening Movement and the support that they receive from Azerbaijani authorities, both state and non-state. According to Akbar Ahmed, after the country gained independence in 1991, the Lezgin and Avar peoples of Azerbaijan "became subjected to Ataturk-style ethnic nationalism by the Azeri-dominated center."

=== Israel ===
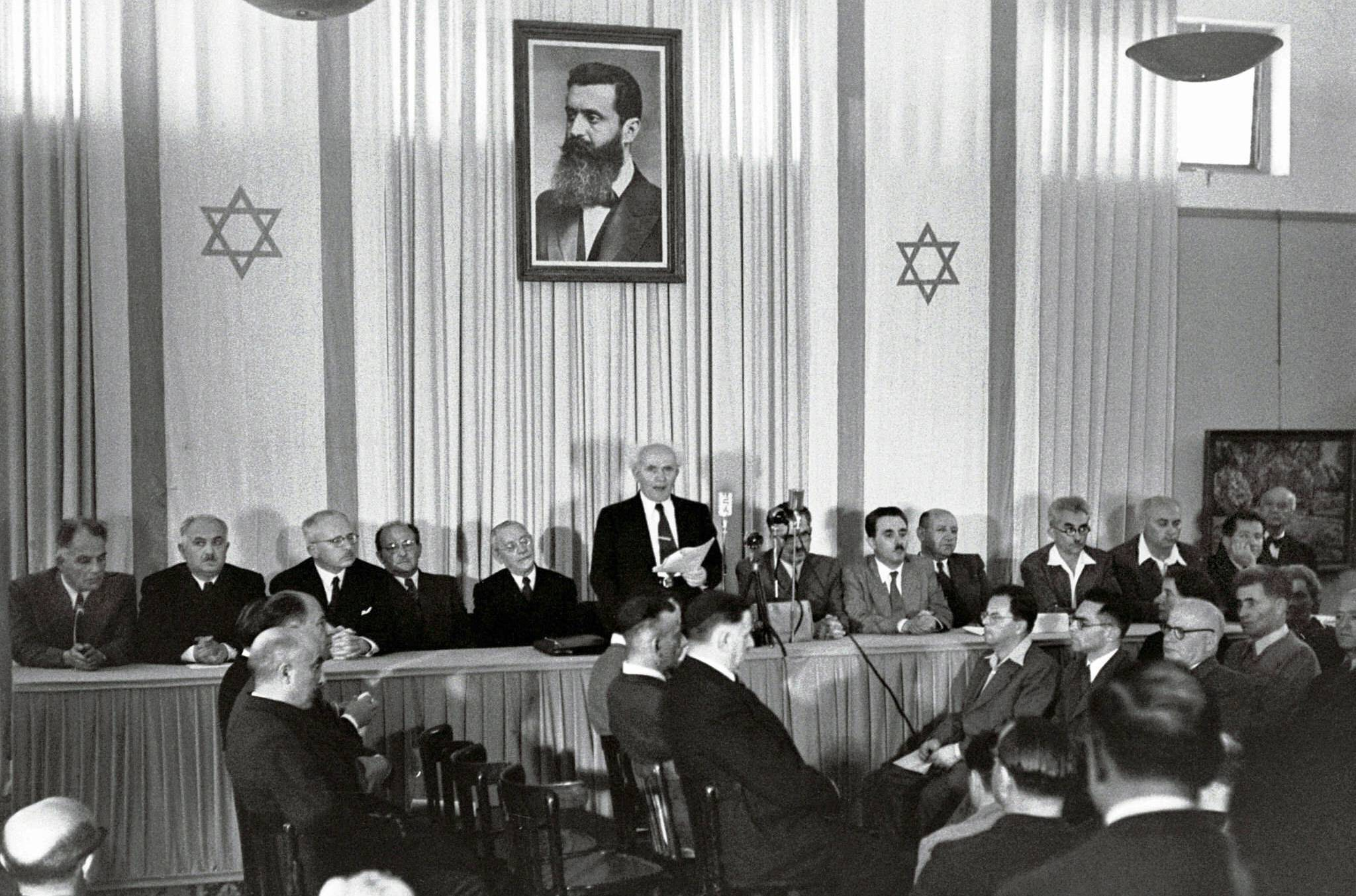
David Ben-Gurion proclaiming Israel's establishment beneath a large portrait of Theodor Herzl

The State of Israel had its origins in Theodore Herzl's work Der Judenstaat, which envisioned the creation of a state for the Jewish people in Palestine or one of several other locations considered around the world. In his later work, The Old New Land, Herzl envisioned a bi-national state, where Jews only made up a majority in a few cities and everyone spoke German. Israel has operated as a liberal democracy founded on Jewish ethnic nationalism.

Concerns about ethnonationalism in Israel were raised since the Knesset's adoption of the Israel as the Nation-State of the Jewish People as part of its basic laws under the Fourth Netanyahu government, an act which was highly controversial within Israel itself and among various Jewish groups in the diaspora, as it potentially threatened the formula of Israel as a Jewish and democratic state. This law was controversial especially with many left-wing Zionists, who saw the bill as undermining Israeli democracy.

=== Malaysia ===
In Malaysia, the Bumiputera principle recognises the "special position" of the Malays provided in the Constitution of Malaysia, in particular Article 153. However, the constitution does not use the term bumiputra; it defines only "Malay" and "indigenous peoples" (Article 160(2)), "natives" of Sarawak (161A(6)(a)), and "natives" of Sabah (Article 161A(6) (b)). Some pro-Bumiputra policies exist as affirmative action for bumiputras since the Malaysian New Economic Policy is based on race, not deprivation. For instance, all Bumiputra, regardless of their financial standing, are entitled to a 7 percent discount on houses or property, including luxurious units, but low-income non-Bumiputra receive no such financial assistance.

Other preferential policies include quotas for admission to government educational institutions, qualifications for public scholarships, marking of universities exam papers, special classes prior to university's end of term exams, positions in government and ownership of businesses. Most of the policies were established in the 1970s. Many policies focus on trying to achieve a Bumiputra share of corporate equity of at least 30% of the total. Ismail Abdul Rahman proposed that target after the government was unable to agree on a suitable policy goal.

=== United States ===
Although American nationalism has typically been described as a paradigmatic example of civic nationalism, since the 2016 US presidential election which brought Donald Trump to the presidency, scholars have observed that ethnic nationalism has become significantly more prominent in American politics. According to political scientists Robert Schertzer and Eric Taylor Woods, "ethnic nationalism was the central feature of Trump’s political strategy" and "he did not win despite his ethnic nationalism—it was in fact the key to his success." Political scientist Jack Thompson argues that the identity politics of Donald Trump surrounding what it means to be a "true" American has resulted in ethnocentric ideals becoming "a robust predictor of vote choice for Trump" among white Americans. Thompson notes that data from the 2016 American National Election Studies (ANES) has revealed a positive association between ethnonationalism and anti-immigrant attitudes among white Americans, whose opposition to immigration is "often grounded in fears of the threat that immigration poses to the robustness of America's national identity" that is shaped by the belief set concerning the ethnic traits of "true" Americans.

== See also ==
- Arab nationalism
- Asabiyyah
- Bengali nationalism
- Black nationalism
- Black supremacy
- Chicano nationalism
- Composite nationalism
- Conservative Revolution (Germany)
- Essentialism
- Ethnic democracy
- Ethnic nationalism in Japan
- Ethnocracy
- Han nationalism
- Herrenvolk democracy
- Identitarian movement
- Identity politics
- Indigenismo
- Juche
- Ketuanan Melayu
- List of irredentist claims or disputes
- List of nationalist organizations
- Liberal ethnic nationalism
- Local ethnic nationalism (China)
- Minzu (民族)
- Nationalist historiography
- Nationalization of history
- Nativism (politics)
- Nihonjinron
- Pan-nationalism
- Religious nationalism
- Social degeneration
- Stateless nation
- White nationalism
- White supremacy
- Xenophobia

== Sources ==
- Ahmed, Akbar S. (1995). "'Ethnic cleansing': A metaphor for our time?". Ethnic and Racial Studies. 18 (1): 1–25. doi:10.1080/01419870.1995.9993851.
- Anderson, James (2016). "Ethnocracy: Exploring and Extending the Concept". Cosmopolitan Civil Societies. 8 (3): 1–29. doi:10.5130/ccs.v8i3.5143.
- Bar-on, Tamir (2018). "The radical right and nationalism". In Rydgren, Jens (ed.). The Oxford handbook of the radical right. Oxford University Press. pp. 17–41. ISBN 9780190274559.
- Bloxham, Donald (2005). The Great Game of Genocide: Imperialism, Nationalism, and the Destruction of the Ottoman Armenians. Oxford University Press. ISBN 9780191500442.
- Le Bossé, Mathias (18 July 2021). "Ethnonationalism". Geography. Oxford Bibliographies. doi:10.1093/OBO/9780199874002-0232. ISBN 978-0-19-987400-2.
- Cohen, Matteo Iddo (2022). "Neither Civic nor Ethnic: Analyzing Right-Wing Politics Using a Theoretical Expansion of Kohn's "Dichotomy of Nationalism"". Nature Human Behaviour. 16 (1): 1–22. doi:10.2478/jnmlp-2022-0001.
- Leoussi, Athena, ed. (2001). Encyclopedia of Nationalism. New Brunswick, NJ: Transaction Publishers. ISBN 9781412822558.
- Muller, Jerry Z. (2008). "Us and Them: The Enduring Power of Ethnic Nationalism". Foreign Affairs. 87 (2): 18–35. JSTOR 20032578.
- Rad, Mostafa Salari; Ginges, Jeremy (2018). "Folk theories of nationality and anti-immigrant attitudes". Nature Human Behaviour. 2 (5): 343–347. doi:10.1038/s41562-018-0334-3. PMID 30962601. S2CID 4898162.
- Rangelov, Iavor (2013). Nationalism and the Rule of Law: Lessons from the Balkans and Beyond. Cambridge University Press. pp. 19–44. doi:10.1017/CBO9780511997938. ISBN 9780511997938.
- Roshwald, Aviel (2001). Ethnic Nationalism and the Fall of Empires: Central Europe, the Middle East and Russia, 1914–1923. London and New York: Routledge. ISBN 9781134682539.
- Safran, William (2008). "Language, ethnicity and religion: a complex and persistent linkage: Language, ethnicity and religion". Nations and Nationalism. 14 (1): 171–190. doi:10.1111/j.1469-8129.2008.00323.x.
- Scherrer, Christian P. (1999). "Towards a theory of modern genocide. Comparative genocide research: Definitions, criteria, typologies, cases, key elements, patterns and voids". Journal of Genocide Research. 1 (1): 13–23. doi:10.1080/14623529908413932.
- Smith, Anthony D. (1981). The Ethnic Revival in the Modern World. Cambridge: Cambridge University Press. ISBN 9780521232678.
- Smith, Anthony D. (1987) [1986]. The Ethnic Origins of Nations. Oxford and New York: Blackwell. ISBN 9780631152057.
- Smith, Anthony D. (2009). Ethno-symbolism and Nationalism: A Cultural Approach. London and New York: Routledge. ISBN 9781135999483.
- Smith, Anthony D. (1994). "Ethnic Nationalism and the Plight of Minorities". Journal of Refugee Studies. 7 (2–3): 186–198. doi:10.1093/jrs/7.2-3.186.
- Thompson, J. (2021). "What it means to be a "true American": Ethnonationalism and voting in the 2016 U.S. presidential election". Nations and Nationalism. 27: 279–297. doi:10.1111/nana.12638. S2CID 225472000.
- Thompson, J. (2022). "Ethnonationalism and White immigration attitudes". Nations and Nationalism. 28 (1): 31–46. doi:10.1111/nana.12754. S2CID 237914361.
- Yilmaz, Muzaffer Ercan (2018). "The Rise of Ethnic Nationalism, Intra-State Conflicts and Conflict Resolution". Journal of TESAM Akademy. 5 (1): 11–33. doi:10.30626/tesamakademi.393051.
