= Islamic Organisation "Young Afghanistan" =

Islamic Organisation "Young Afghanistan" سازمان اسلامی افغانستان جوان
- Leader: Seyyed Jawad Hossaini
- Religion: Islam
- National affiliation: Afghanistan

Islamic Organisation "Young Afghanistan" (Dari: سازمان اسلامی افغانستان جوان) is a political party in Afghanistan, led by Seyyed Jawad Hossaini. The party has formed part of the Advisory Commission of National and Democratic Parties and the National Understanding Front of Afghanistan.
