= Ajmal Sohail =

Afghan political economist

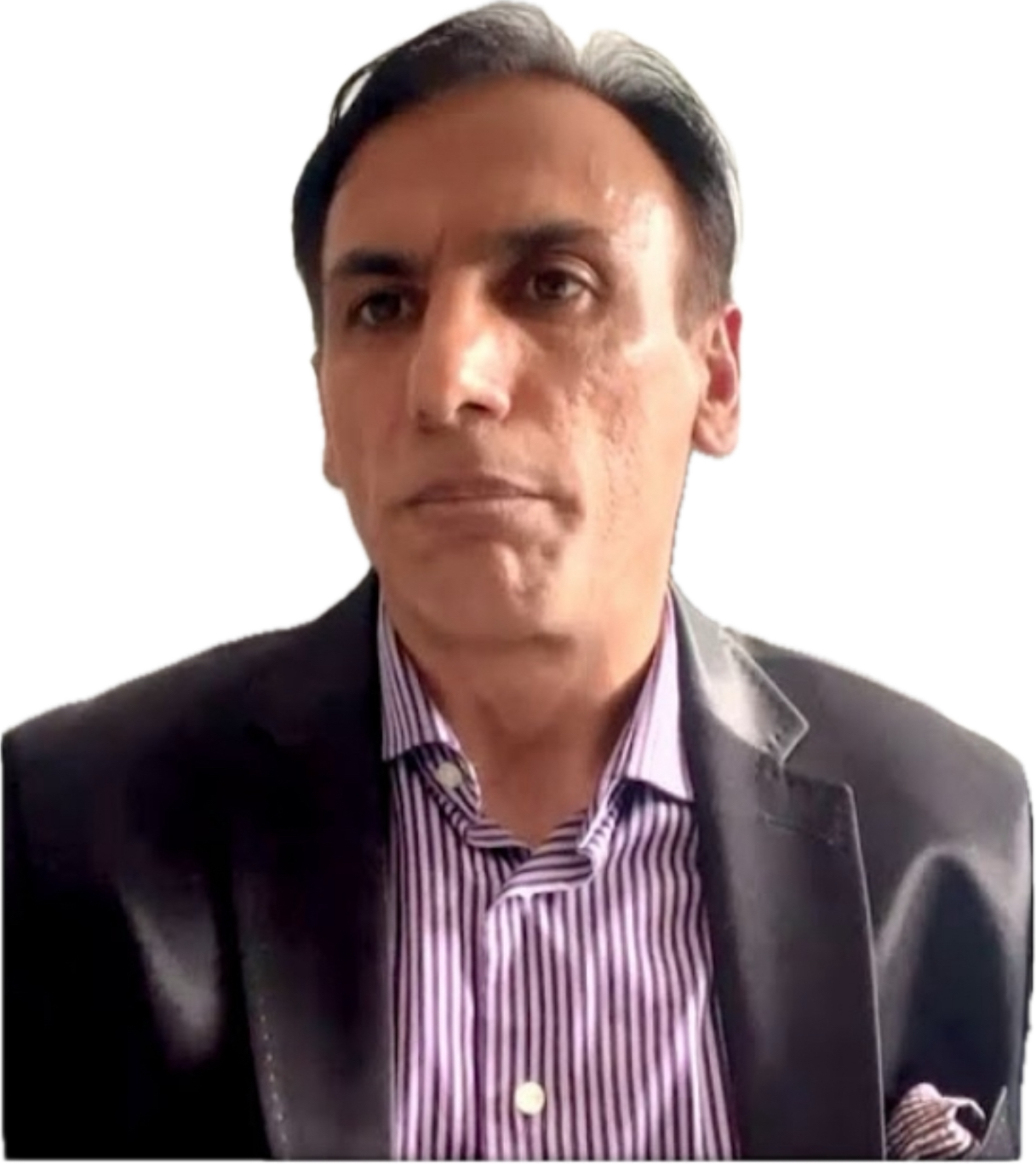
- Education: Practitioner degrees
- Alma mater: Leiden University and the University of Maryland
- Occupation(s): Geo-Security Consultant and Private Investigator
- Website: www.ajmalsohail.com

Ajmal Sohail is an Afghan politician, political economist, intelligence analyst, and counter-terrorism expert. He is the co-founder and co-president of the Counter Narco-Terrorism Alliance Germany, where he oversees intelligence and counter-terrorism initiatives.

== Education ==
Sohail pursued advanced studies in terrorism and extremism, earning degrees from both Leiden University in the Netherlands and the University of Maryland in the United States.

== Career ==
Throughout his career, Sohail has been deeply involved in Afghan politics and international security. He founded the Afghan Liberal Party, aiming to promote liberal democratic values in Afghanistan. He has also served as an economic advisor to the vice-presidency of the Islamic Republic of Afghanistan and has been a parliamentary candidate on two occasions.

He is also a co-president of the Counter Narco-Terrorism Alliance Germany, Sohail directs intelligence and counter-terrorism operations. His expertise in these areas has led to regular features in international news outlets, both in print and on television.

== Selected publications ==
- Islamic State-Central versus Islamic State-Khurasan (April 30, 2024)
- World Economic Forum and India Steered Indo-Pacific Strategy-Centric Policy (January 17, 2023)
- The Taliban Finally Granted Permission to Former President Karzai to Leave Afghanistan (November 27, 2022)
