= Republican Party of Afghanistan =

Political party established in 1999

Republican Party of Afghanistan حزب جمهوری خواهان افغانستان
- Leader: Sebghatullah Sanjar (until 2012)
- President: Adelah Bahram Nezami
- Founded: 6 November 1999
- Banned: 15 August 2021
- Ideology: Anticlericalism; Legal egalitarianism Liberal feminism Liberal socialism Radicalism; Populism; Progressivism; Republicanism; Secularism; Secular humanism Social democracy Social liberalism Third way
- Political position: Centre to centre-left

Website
- afghanistanrepublicanparty.org

The Republican Party of Afghanistan (Persian: حزب جمهوریخواهان افغانستان, Hezb-e Jomhorikhahan-e Afghanistan) is a political party in Afghanistan. When the party was founded in 1999, it declared the Universal Declaration of Human Rights as the programme of the party. Sebghatullah Sanjar was elected as the chairman of the party.

The party established liaisons with the United Nations Special Mission to Afghanistan office in Kabul, and was invited to the 2001 Bonn conference; Zai Waziri, the founder and its first leader participated the Bonn Conference. However, a shift in the UNSMA office resulted in the group being degraded to observers at the conference. Along with other democratic sections that had been invited to the Bonn conference, the party took part in founding the Council of Defenders of Peace and Democracy in the spring of 2002, just weeks before the opening of the Emergency Loya Jirga. In late 2002, the leadership of the party was passed over to Sibghatullah Sanjar, after an election within the party ranks.

During the constitutional Loya jirga of 2003, the Party announced its support for a presidential system in the future constitution of Afghanistan. The Party also expressed its support for free education and health care. As of 2003, the party claimed to have 35 000 members across the country.

On 6 March 2004, it became the first political party to register at the Ministry of Justice under the new system.

On October 1, 2005 it took part in founding the Advisory Commission of National and Democratic Parties (AC-NDP), a broad coalition of factions opposed to 'warlordism'. However it soon withdrew from the new structure.

The party headquarters is located in Qae Fathollah, a district of Kabul.

Adla Bahram is the director of women's affairs of the party and now the elected party president.

The party leader, Sebghatullah Sanjar, was assassinated in Kabul on 5 May 2012.
