= People's Solidarity Movement of Afghanistan (Feda'ian) =

The People's Solidarity Movement of Afghanistan (Feda'ian) (Dari: نهضت همبستگی مردم افغانستان (فدائیان)) was a political party in Afghanistan. It was led by Safar Muhammad Khadem.
