= Unit Party =

A Unit party is a union of two parties such as the National Movement Party and the Progressive Learning Party. Unit parties are established by big groups which are mostly in power before 1992. The leaders of the party are Shir Bazgar and Abdul Haq Holomi. The party's ideology and goals are Islamic. The party is supported and funded by large groups of Afghans residing in America, Europe, and Australia.

== See also ==
- Coalition government
- Popular front
- United front

== Sources ==
- https://web.archive.org/web/20090903135346/http://www.watan-afg.com/new_page_6.htm
- http://www.mashal.org/content.php?c=payamha&id=00201
