= Linguistic nationalism =

Linguistic nationalism may refer to:

- a dominant culture's use of language to exercise its dominance, see Linguistic imperialism
- the use of linguistics to support nationalistic ideologies, see Historiography and nationalism
