= Umut Özkırımlı =

Turkish political scientist (born 1970)

- Born: 18 November 1970 (age 55); Ankara, Turkey
- Citizenship: Swedish and Turkish
- Scientific career
- Fields: Political science
- Workplaces: Istanbul Bilgi University, Lund University, IBEI - Institut Barcelona Estudis Internacionals, Blanquerna - Universitat Ramon Llull, CIDOB - Barcelona Centre for International Affairs
- Website: umutozkirimli.com

Umut Özkırımlı (born 18 November 1970) is a political scientist known for his work in nationalism studies, social movements, and identity politics.

== Biography ==
Özkırımlı was born in Ankara, Turkey. After completing his secondary education in Lycée Saint-Joseph, Istanbul in Istanbul, he attended Boğaziçi University. He received his master's degree from London School of Economics and Political Science and his doctoral degree from Istanbul University. He taught as an associate professor in the International Relations department of Istanbul Bilgi University, and was a professor in Contemporary Turkey Studies at the Center for Middle Eastern Studies, Lund University, Sweden. Currently, he is a Senior Research Fellow at IBEI - Institut Barcelona Estudis Internacionals, a Professor at Blanquerna – Universitat Ramon Llull and a Senior Research Associate at CIDOB - Barcelona Centre for International Affairs. He is also the Academic Director of the Barcelona Summer School of the Mediterranean and the Middle East.

The second edition of his first book Theories of Nationalism. A Critical Introduction was published in April 2010. His second book Contemporary Debates on Nationalism: A Critical Engagement, published in 2005, continued where he left off in the first book and focused on more recent (i.e. postmodern, feminist and post-colonial) accounts of nationalism along with topics such as globalization, cosmopolitanism, multiculturalism. The third book, Tormented by History: Nationalism in Greece and Turkey, co-authored with Spyros Sofos, marks the first sustained and critical effort to study Greek and Turkish nationalisms in a comparative perspective. Özkırımlı's edited volumes include Nationalism and its Futures and (with Ayhan Aktar and Niyazi Kizilyurek) Nationalism in the Troubled Triangle: Cyprus, Greece and Turkey.

In 2020, a postdoctoral researcher at Lund University, Pınar Dinç, accused Özkırımlı of “stalking” on social media. Özkırımlı sued Dinç. The Lund District Court Criminal Division found Dinç guilty on seven counts of “gross defamation” and “defamation” out of a total of eleven counts on October 13, 2021 (case number B6460-20). The final decision stated that:

Pinar Dinc has in the above postings depicted Umut Özkirimli as criminal or reprehensible in his behaviour. The statements have been such that they would be expected to subject Umut Özkirimli to the disdain of others. The statements have been untrue and there has been no reasonable reason to spread them.

The decision was upheld by the Court of Appeals of Skåne and Blekinge which found Dinç guilty on three counts of “gross defamation” and one count of “defamation”, and increased the damages she should pay by 50 percent (case number B3866-21).The ruling deemed that “there is no obligation, legal or employment-wise, to submit the information”, and stated that the employee “is convicted of a crime which is punishable by imprisonment”. The decision entered into legal force on November 3, 2022.

In 2023, Özkırımlı published his debut popular book, Cancelled: The Left Way Back from Woke.

== Political views ==
=== Views on Erdoğan and Turkish democracy ===
In January 2017, Özkırımlı described Turkey's political system under Recep Tayyip Erdoğan as developing into "a one-man authoritarian rule", which he said had "been in the making since 2013".

In 2023, Özkırımlı argued that Erdoğan's "unabashedly Islamist regime" shared greater continuity with the secular nation-state envisioned by Mustafa Kemal and his associates "than its proponents are prepared to admit". He described Erdoğan's system as "authoritarian, anti-pluralist, based on a notion of strong leadership and the personality cult that goes with it." He argued that Turkey's democratic backsliding was not simply a return of religion or an inherent incompatibility between Islam and democracy, but a continuation of Turkey's political tradition. For him, this development was rooted in a strong, paternalist state that holds together competing communities through political authority and, when necessary, force, rather than through a shared set of values.

In March 2025, Özkırımlı published a commentary in Project Syndicate in which he described the arrest of Istanbul mayor Ekrem İmamoğlu as part of what he portrayed as a coup by President Recep Tayyip Erdoğan, and argued that Turkey's political system had become a "full-blown autocracy" rather than merely a "hybrid regime". He wrote that “the old Turkey is gone” and argued that, when "the game is rigged," the opposition's only chance was to "flip the board."

=== Threats and allegations of persecution ===
In 2013, Özkırımlı said he received death threats after provoking the anger of pro-AKP activists due to his online activity during the Gezi Park protests, leading him to carry a personal alarm for several months. In January 2017, giving evidence to a UK Parliament committee, he said that he had not visited Turkey since June of the previous year and was unwilling to risk returning because, under the state of emergency that followed the coup attempt, the authorities could confiscate passports and detain people without access to an attorney for 10 days or without informing them of the reason for their detention for up to a month. In 2019, he wrote that he did not regard himself as a political exile "in the strict sense of the word", since he had left Turkey voluntarily, in 2011, and contrasted his situation with that of the Academics for Peace, whose members had faced state prosecution. In 2023, Özkırımlı argued that pro-government Turkish media had amplified the Pınar Dinç case as part of a political campaign against him, including by portraying him as a "terrorist pervert."

== Publications ==
- Yumul, A., and U. Özkırımlı 2000. “Reproducing the nation: banal nationalism'in the Turkish press”. Media, Culture & Society 22.
- Theories of Nationalism. A Critical Introduction (2000) ISBN 0-312-22942-9
- Özkırımlı, U. 2003. “The nation as an artichoke? A critique of ethnosymbolist interpretations of nationalism”. Nations and Nationalism 9.
- Contemporary Debates on Nationalism: A Critical Engagement (2005) ISBN 0-333-94773-8
- Özkırımlı, U., & Grosby, S. (2007). "Nationalism theory debate: the antiquity of nations?". Nations and Nationalism, 13(3), 523–537.
- Tormented by History: Nationalism in Greece and Turkey, co-authored with Spyros Sofos (2008) ISBN 1-85065-899-4.
- Özkırımlı, U. (2011). "The changing nature of nationalism in Turkey: Actors, discourses, and the struggle for hegemony". Symbiotic Antagonisms: Competing Nationalisms in Turkey, 82–100.
- Özkırımlı, U. (ed.). (2014). The Making of a Protest Movement in Turkey: #occupygezi. Basingstoke, UK: Palgrave Macmillan.
- Özkırımlı, Umut (2023). Cancelled: The Left Way Back from Woke. Cambridge, UK, and Hoboken, New Jersey: Polity. ISBN 9781509550937.
