= Hans Kohn =

American philosopher and historian

- Born: September 15, 1891; Prague, Bohemia, Austria-Hungary
- Died: March 16, 1971 (aged 79); Philadelphia
- Known for: Philosophy of Nationalism
- Spouse: Jetty Wahl

Academic work
- Discipline: History
- Sub-discipline: Nationalism

Hans Kohn (September 15, 1891 – March 16, 1971) was an American philosopher and historian. He pioneered the academic study of nationalism, and is considered an authority on the subject.

== Life ==
Kohn was born into a German-speaking Jewish family in Prague, Bohemia, then part of Austria-Hungary. After graduating from a local German gymnasium (high school) in 1909, he studied philosophy, political science and law at the German part of Charles-Ferdinand University in Prague.

Shortly after graduation, in late 1914 Kohn was called into the infantry of the Austro-Hungarian Army. Following training he was sent to the Eastern Front in the Carpathian Mountains, facing the Imperial Russian Army. He was captured in 1915 and taken by the Russians to a prison camp in Central Asia (in present-day Turkmenistan). During the civil war following the Bolshevik revolution, the pro-western Czechoslovak Legions came into Central Asia and he was set free. With them he traveled further east (called by Czechs the "Siberian Anabasis"), until stopping at Irkutsk. The political situation then allowed him to return to Europe, arriving in 1920.

Kohn then lived in Paris, where he married Jetty Wahl in 1921.

The couple moved to London, where Kohn worked for Zionist organizations and wrote articles for newspapers. He moved to Palestine in 1925. From there he would frequently visit the United States. His writings began to generate books, where he discussed current geopolitics and nationalism. In 1929, he wrote a resignation letter from Keren HaYesod titled "Judaism is Not Zionism". Following the Hebron massacre three months prior, he wrote a following letter:

“I feel that I can no longer remain a leading official within the Zionist Organisation… We pretend to be innocent victims. Of course the Arabs attacked us in August [1929]. Since they have no armies, they could not obey the rules of war. They perpetrated all the barbaric acts that are characteristic of a colonial revolt. But we are obliged to look into the deeper cause of this revolt. We have been in Palestine for twelve years [since the start of the British occupation] without having even once made a serious attempt at seeking through negotiations the consent of the indigenous people. We have been relying exclusively upon Great Britain’s military might. We have set ourselves goals which by their very nature had to lead to conflict with Arabs… for twelve years we pretended that the Arabs did not exist and were glad when we were not reminded of their existence.”

Eventually the couple immigrated to America in 1934. They had one son, Immanuel Kohn.

Kohn was a prominent leader of Brit Shalom, which promoted a binational solution for promoting the co-existence of Jews and Arabs in the Mandatory Palestine.

== Career ==
Kohn taught modern history at Smith College in Northampton, Massachusetts. From 1948 to 1961, he taught at City College of New York. He also taught at the New School for Social Research, Harvard Summer School.

He wrote numerous books on nationalism, Pan-Slavism, German thought, and Judaism. He was an early contributor to the Foreign Policy Research Institute in Philadelphia.

In 1944, he published his major work, The Idea of Nationalism, on the dichotomy between western and eastern Nationalism. Kohn sought to understand the emergence of nationalism through the development of western civilization and the rise of liberalism. He also published a biography of Martin Buber. His autobiography, published in 1964, includes reflections on his times and his personal life.

== Selected works ==
- A History of Nationalism in the East, 1929
- Martin Buber, 1930.
- Nationalism and Imperialism in the Hither East, 1932
- Nationalism in the Soviet Union, 1932 [1966]
- Western Civilization in the Near East, 1936
- Force Or Reason: Issues of the Twentieth Century, 1938
- The Idea of Nationalism: A Study in Its Origins and Background, 1944
- Prophets and Peoples: Studies in Nineteenth Century Nationalism, 1946.
- The Twentieth Century: A Midway Account of the Western World, 1950
- Pan-Slavism: Its History and Ideology, 1953
- African Nationalism in the Twentieth Century, 1953, co-author
- Nationalism and Liberty: The Swiss Example, George Allen and Unwin, London, 1956
- American Nationalism: An Interpretative Essay, Macmillan, New York, 1957
- Is the Liberal West in Decline? Pall Mall Press, 1957
- Zion and the Jewish National Idea, Menorah, 1958, 63 p.
- Heinrich Heine: The Man and the Myth, Leo Baeck Institute, New York, 1959
- The Mind of Germany, Charles Scribner's Sons 1960, Harper Torchbooks 1965
- The Habsburg Empire, 1804–1918, 1961
- Living in a World Revolution: My Encounters with History, Simon and Schuster, New York, 1964
- Nationalism: Its Meaning & History, 1965, reprint/revised, 1982
- A History of the European Century, vol. 1: Absolutism and Democracy 1814–1852, D. Van Nostrand, Princeton, New Jersey, 1965
- Prelude to Nation-States: The French and German Experiences, 1789–1815 D. Van Nostrand, 1967
