= Donald Ipperciel =

Canadian philosopher

- Awards: Ordre des Palmes Académiques, Canada Research Chair

Education
- Education: l’Université de Montréal (BA, MA), Ruprecht-Karls-Universität (PhD)

Philosophical work
- Era: 21st-century philosophy
- Region: Western philosophy
- School: Continental
- Institutions: York University

Donald Ipperciel is a Canadian philosopher and professor of philosophy at York University. From 2002 to 2012, he held the Canada Research Chair in Political Philosophy and Canadian Studies at the University of Alberta, Campus Saint-Jean. Ipperciel is a recipient of the Ordre des Palmes Académiques.
