= Cornell University Southeast Asia Program =

Southeast Asia Program
- Established: 1950
- Faculty: Eric Tagliacozzo
- Address: 180 Uris Hall, Ithaca, New York, 14853
- Location: Ithaca, New York, U.S.
- Website: Official website

The Southeast Asia Program (SEAP), part of the Mario Einaudi Center for International Studies at Cornell University, was founded in 1950 to promote the acquisition and dissemination of knowledge about countries, cultures and languages of the region. It is an interdisciplinary program of Cornell University that focuses on the development of graduate training and research opportunities on the languages and cultures of Brunei, Burma, Cambodia, Indonesia, Laos, Malaysia, the Philippines, Singapore, Thailand, and Vietnam. Cornell University is known for being the "Mecca of Southeast Asian studies."

== Overview ==
The Department of Education continuously recognized SEAP as a Title VI National Resource Center until 2025 when the department formally ended the National Resource Center program. As an NRC, the program trained experts on the region, educated students in rarely taught Southeast Asian languages, and supported K-16 educators in New York State.

SEAP offers instruction at four levels of study in Burmese, Indonesian, Khmer, Tagalog, Thai, and Vietnamese. As an interdisciplinary program, SEAP coordinates resources and facilities for Cornell undergraduates, graduate students, and other scholars specializing in the culture, economy, history, politics, development, and society of contemporary, colonial, and traditional Southeast Asia. Its graduate student community organizes the weekly lunchtime Ronald and Janette Gatty Lecture Series, which brings scholars from Cornell and other institutions to present an informal lunchtime lecture on their work. SEAP graduate students also hold an annual graduate student conference in the spring.

For undergraduate students, SEAP coordinates a number of study abroad opportunities and internships in Southeast Asia. It also makes funding available for coursework, research, travel, and summer language study opportunities, including the Southeast Asian Summer Studies Institute at the University of Wisconsin–Madison.

== John M. Echols Collection on Southeast Asia ==
SEAP is home to the John M. Echols Collection on Southeast Asia, the largest collection on the region with over 500,000 monographs in 162 indigenous languages. The Southeast Asia Collection was named in 1977 in honor of John M. Echols, professor of linguistics and literature in SEAP, who devoted three decades to its development. The Echols Collection has been a joint undertaking of the university, the library, and SEAP with the goal of acquiring a copy of every publication of research value produced in the countries of Southeast Asia and publications about the region published in other parts of the world.

== George McT. Kahin Center for Advanced Research on Southeast Asia ==
The George McT. Kahin Center for Advanced Research on Southeast Asia is located in the historic "Treman House". When it was built in 1902, the house at 640 Stewart Ave boasted a hand-operated elevator, electric bells, speaking tubes, and central heating. The house was built by Robert H. Treman, son of an enterprising local family and the first member of that family to attend Cornell University and be elected to its board of trustees.

This historic house, dedicated on May 11, 1992, as the George McT. Kahin Center for Advanced Research on Southeast Asia is home to SEAP graduate students, visiting fellows and scholars, faculty members, and SEAP's Publication and Outreach offices. George Kahin, its namesake, says it serves as SEAP'S "spiritual epicenter", where a diverse group of students and faculty whose interests span a range of disciplines can draw upon each other's experiences and knowledge of Southeast Asia.

A variety of events take place in the Kahin Center, including SEAP's Ronald and Janette Gatty Lecture Series, scheduled at 12:00 pm each Thursday during the academic year, and other student- and faculty- sponsored symposia and conferences.

== SEAP Publications ==
SEAP Publications, an imprint of Cornell University Press, publishes and distributes academic books and a semi-annual journal on Indonesia. SEAP Publications seeks to make scholarship on Southeast Asia widely available to interested readers. SEAP books are divided into these four main series:

- Studies on Southeast Asia Series (SOSEA). The Studies on Southeast Asia Series (SOSEA) is made up of substantial scholarly books, essay collections, and monographs, usually in the fields of history, anthropology, or political studies.
- Southeast Asia Program Series (SEAPS). The Southeast Asia Program Series (SEAPS) was conceptualized as a successor to the earlier Southeast Asia Program Data Papers Series, which began publication in 1951. These books offer current research by young scholars.
- Cornell Modern Indonesia Project (CMIP). The Cornell Modern Indonesia Project was initiated in 1956 with translations of significant documents and literature concerned with modern Indonesia. This series includes many translations of primary source materials, along with original studies of the nation's contemporary political events and the evolution of its government through the twentieth century.
- Language books. Cornell offers instructional language textbooks for students of Indonesian, Khmer, Tagalog, Thai, and Vietnamese.

== Benedict Anderson ==
Political scientist and historian Benedict Anderson (1936–2015) was a notable SEAP alumnus and former director of the program. He earned a classics degree from Cambridge University in 1957 before attending Cornell University, where he concentrated on Indonesia as a research interest and in 1967 received his Ph.D. in government studies. His doctoral advisor at Cornell was Southeast Asian scholar George Kahin.

Anderson was best known for his 1983 book Imagined Communities, which explored the origins of nationalism. He was the Aaron L. Binenkorb Professor Emeritus of International Studies, Government and Asian Studies at Cornell University; he was a polyglot with an interest in southeast Asia. His work on the "Cornell Paper", which debunked the official story of Indonesia's 30 September Movement and the subsequent anti-communist purges of 1965–1966, led to his expulsion from that country. He was the brother of Perry Anderson, an historian at UCLA.

== See also ==
- SEAlang Library
