= Daniel Lev =

American political scientist (1933–2006)

- Born: October 23, 1933; Youngstown, Ohio, United States
- Died: July 29, 2006 (aged 72); Seattle, Washington, United States
- Education: Miami University; Cornell University
- Occupation: political scientist
- Employer(s): University of California, Berkeley; University of Washington
- Known for: scholar on Indonesia
- Spouse: Arlene O. Lev
- Children: 1 son, 1 daughter

Daniel Saul Lev (October 23, 1933 – July 29, 2006) was an American political scientist and scholar on Indonesia.

Lev was born and raised in Youngstown, Ohio. In his youth, he participated in the Golden Gloves competitions for amateur boxing. He graduated from Miami University in 1955 and received his doctorate from Cornell University, where he became a member of the Modern Indonesia Project. Lev first traveled to Indonesia in 1959 and stayed in the country for three years. Because of his experience in Indonesia, Lev became a proponent of law reform after observing the "systematic dismantling" of its legal system under Presidents Sukarno and Suharto.

After returning to the United States, he became a professor at the University of California, Berkeley. Lev's opposition to the Vietnam War was not well received by the university and likely prevented him from receiving tenure. Soon after, he moved to Seattle to teach at the University of Washington before finally retiring in 1999. As a scholar of Indonesian law, Lev helped the country's lawyers and activists continue their education in the United States. His dissertation titled The Transition to Guided Democracy: Indonesian Politics 1957–1959 analyzed Sukarno's Guided Democracy principles and became a classic reading on the development of the country's political system. He was also a member of Human Rights Watch and served on the advisory committee of its Asia division.

Lev was a heavy smoker and died from lung cancer on July 29, 2006. He had been writing a biography on Chinese Indonesian lawyer and human rights advocate Yap Thiam Hien at the time of his death. Over 900 pages of the book had been written, and two chapters remained unwritten. Fellow scholar and friend Benedict Anderson continued his work and published the book No Concessions: The Life of Yap Thiam Hien, Indonesian Human Rights Lawyer in 2011.

He was married to Arlene O. Lev and had two children, son Louis and daughter Claire.

== Selected publications ==
- No Concessions: The Life of Yap Thiam Hien, Indonesian Human Rights Lawyer (2011)
- The Transition to Guided Democracy: Indonesian Politics, 1957-1959 (2009)
- Yap Thiam Hien and Aceh (2006)
- Politik minoritas: minoritas dalam politik (2000)
- Legal evolution and political authority in Indonesia: selected essays (2000)
- Making Indonesia (1996)
- Making Indonesia (with Ruth McVey), (1996)
- Introduction in "Memoirs of Oei Tjoe Tat, assistant to the president Sukarno" by Oei Tjoe Tjoe (Pengantar dalam "Memoar Oei Tjoe Tat, pembantu presiden Soekarno" oleh Oei Tjoe Tat) (1995)
- Lawyers as outsiders: advocacy versus the state in Indonesia (1992)
- Hukum dan Politik di Indonesia, Kesinambungan dan Perubahan (1990)
- Legal Aid in Indonesia (1987)
- Pengantar dalam "Bantuan hukum dan kemiskinan struktural" oleh T. Mulya Lubis (1986)
- Bush lawyers in Indonesia: stratification, representation and brokerage (1973)
- Islamic courts in Indonesia: a study in the political bases of legal institutions (1972)
- American aid and political development (1967)
- The transition to guided democracy: Indonesian politics, 1957-1959 (1966)
- Republic of Indonesia cabinets, 1945-1965 (1965)
- Some descriptive notes on foreign assistance in Indonesian technical education (1961)
- A bibliography of Indonesian government documents and selected Indonesian writings on government in the Cornell University Library (1958)
