= John Sidel =

American political scientist

- Born: June 4, 1966 (age 60); New York City, USA
- Education: Yale University (MA); Cornell University (PhD)
- Scientific career
- Fields: political science
- Doctoral advisor: Benedict Anderson

John Thayer Sidel (born June 4, 1966) is a political scientist and currently holds the Sir Patrick Gillam Professorship in International and Comparative Politics at the London School of Economics (LSE). He is affiliated with both the Department of Government and the International Relations department, as well as the Asia Research Centre.

Sidel has written several books as well as a range of journal articles and essays in edited volumes, and he serves as co-editor of the Contemporary Issues in Asia and the Pacific Series at Stanford University Press and a member of the editorial boards of the journals South East Asia Research and Indonesia and the Malay World. He has served as an occasional commentator in the media and as a consultant for a range of government and multilateral agencies, foundations, and non-governmental organizations.

== Early life and education ==
He was born on June 4, 1966, in New York City. He received his bachelor's degree (Summa Cum Laude, Phi Beta Kappa) and an MA in Political Science in 1988 from Yale University, where he worked closely with James C. Scott, and he received his PhD in 1995 from Cornell University, where he worked under the supervision of Benedict Anderson. Sidel taught at the School of Oriental and African Studies (SOAS), University of London, first as a lecturer in Southeast Asian Politics (1994–2001) and then as a Reader in Southeast Asian Politics (2001–2004).

== Research ==
Sidel's research focuses on Southeast Asia, with expertise on the Philippines and Indonesia, where he has conducted primary research and fieldwork since the late 1980s. His research and writing to date cover three main issue areas: local politics and the persistence of subnational authoritarianism in formally democratic settings; religious violence and mobilization in the name of Islam; and the role of transnational forces in anti-colonial 'nationalist' revolutions.

Sidel's research and writing are noteworthy for their interdisciplinary nature, for the contrarian nature of their contributions to existing bodies of literature, and for their efforts to bridge the divide between qualitative comparative social-science research, on the one hand, and Southeast Asian Studies, on the other. His first book, Capital, Coercion, and Crime: Bossism in the Philippines (Stanford: Stanford University Press, 1999) gained attention from academics, journalists, and NGO activists—by pioneering the study of subnational authoritarianism in Southeast Asia, and his work on local bosses, dynasties, and gangsters is widely cited by scholars working on Southeast Asia and other parts of the world. In this book, he made the argument that democratization and decentralization facilitate the rise of subnational authoritarianism, as seen in contexts as varied as Brazil, Russia, Indonesia, and South Africa. Meanwhile, Sidel's book Philippine Politics and Society in the Twentieth Century: Colonial Legacies, Post-Colonial Trajectories (London: Routledge, 2000), co-authored with Eva-Lotta Hedman, further established his influence on the study of the Philippines.

With the publication of Riots, Pogroms, Jihad: Religious Violence in Indonesia (Ithaca, NY: Cornell University Press, 2006), Sidel's work attracted renewed critical attention among scholars, journalists, and policy-makers, especially in the context of rising interest in Islamist terrorism in Southeast Asia. Sidel's book offered an original explanation for the pattern of religious violence in Indonesia from the mid-1990s through 2005, linking the shifts from riots (1995–97) to pogroms (1998–2001) to jihad (2002–2005) to changes in the structures of religious identity and authority in Indonesia, and to the uncertainties and anxieties accompanying those changes. As Sadanand Dhume notes, Mr. Sidel traces the roots of religious conflict in Indonesia to Dutch rule. He contends that the Dutch system of pillarization, in which Catholics and Protestants developed their own religious schools, associations and political parties, was mimicked in Indonesia to a striking degree. A person’s religious identity—Catholic, Protestant, nominal Muslim or orthodox Muslim—determined his schooling and, ultimately, his access to power through the legislature, the civil service or the military. One of the shortcomings of the work, however, is that Sidel's institutionalist argument neglects jihadists' ideological arguments about why they engage in violent jihad. Sidel's publication of The Islamist Threat in Southeast Asia: A Reassessment] (Washington, D.C.: East-West Center, 2007) earned considerable attention, due to his attack against alarmist accounts of Islamist mobilization in Southeast Asia and his argument that violence in the name of Islam reflects the weakness, rather than the strength, of Islamist forces in the region.

Since 2008, Sidel has been working on broad comparative themes covering the full extent of Southeast Asia and beyond. In an article in Comparative Politics, he linked the diverging trajectories of democratization across Southeast Asia to the variegated pattern of business class formation observed across the region from the mid-19th century to the present. Forthcoming essays treat such themes as the diverging fates of nationalism across post-independence Southeast Asia, on the one hand, and the emerging body of research on so-called subnational authoritarianism across such settings as southern Italy and post-Soviet Russia.

Sidel is currently researching the diverging fates of nationalism across post-independence Southeast Asia, on the one hand, and the emerging body of research on so-called subnational authoritarianism across such settings as southern Italy and post-Soviet Russia. He is also working on a major revisionist study of the 'nationalist' revolutions of Southeast Asia that stresses the role of major international conflicts and powerful transnational forces in the transitions to independence across the region. He has also begun work on a study of intolerance and persecution of religious deviance across the Muslim world, with a special focus on the treatment of the Ahmadiyya minority in a range of countries across Asia and Africa.

== Recent publications ==
- Sidel, John (2021) "Republicanism, Communism, Islam: Cosmopolitan Origins of Revolution in Southeast Asia". Cornell University Press, Ithaca, N.Y., US. ISBN 978-1501755613
- Sidel, John & Jamie Faustino (2019) "Thinking and Working Politically in Development: Coalitions for Change in the Philippines". The Asia Foundation, Mandaluyong City, Philippines. ISBN 978-971-95652-6-0
- Sidel, John (2009) "Walking in the shadow of the big man: Junstiniano Montano and failed dynasty building in Cavite 1935-1972". In: McCoy, Alfred W., (ed.) An anarchy of families: state and family in the Philippines. University of Wisconsin Press, Madison, USA, pp. 109-162. ISBN 978-0-299-22984-9
- Sidel, John (2008) "The Islamist threat in Southeast Asia: much ado about nothing?" Asian affairs, 16 (3). pp. 339-351. ISSN 0306-8374
- Sidel, John (2008) "Social origins of dictatorship and democracy revisited: colonial state and Chinese immigrant in the making of modern Southeast Asia". Comparative politics, 40 (2). pp. 127-147. ISSN 0010-4159
- Sidel, John (2008) "Jihad and the specter of transnational Islam in Southeast Asia": a comparative historical perspective. In: Tagliacozzo, Eric, (ed.) Southeast Asia and the Middle East: Islam, movement, and the longue durée. Stanford University Press, Stanford, USA, pp. 275-318. ISBN 978-0-8047-6133-8
- Sidel, John (2008) "The manifold meanings of displacement: explaining inter-religious violence in Indonesia, 1999-2001". In: Hedman, Eva-Lotta E., (ed.) Conflict, violence, and displacement in Indonesia. Cornell University Southeast Asia Program, Ithaca, N.Y., USA, pp. 29-59. ISBN 978-0-87727-775-0
- Sidel, John (2007) "It's not getting worse: terrorism is declining in Asia". Global Asia, 2 (3). pp. 41-49.
- Sidel, John (2007) "From Russia with Love?" Indonesia, 84 pp. 161-172. ISSN 0019-7289
- Sidel, John (2007) "The Islamist threat in Southeast Asia: a reassessment". East-West Center Washington, Washington D.C., USA. ISBN 978-981-230-489-6
- Sidel, John (2007) "On the 'anxiety of incompleteness': a post-structuralist approach to religious violence in Indonesia ". South East Asia research, 15 (2). pp. 133-212. ISSN 0967-828X
- Sidel, John (2007) "Indonesia: migrants, migrant workers, refugees, and the new citizenship law". United Nations High Commissioner for Refugees, Geneva, Switzerland
- Sidel, John (2006) "Riots, Pogroms, Jihad: Religious Violence in Indonesia". Cornell University Press, Ithaca, N.Y., US. ISBN 978-0-8014-4515-6
