= Buzzer Beater (manga) =

Japanese manga series by Takehiko Inoue

- First volume cover of the manga (2005 edition)
- Genre: Science fiction; Sports
- Manga
- Written by: Takehiko Inoue
- Published by: Shueisha
- English publisher: NA: Manga Planet (digital)
- Imprint: Jump Comics
- Magazine: Sports-i ESPN website; Monthly Shōnen Jump
- Original run: May 1996 – August 1998
- Volumes: 4
- Anime television series
- Directed by: Shigeyuki Miya
- Written by: Akatsuki Yamatoya
- Music by: Koichiro Kameyama
- Studio: TMS Entertainment
- Original network: Wowow
- Original run: February 5, 2005 – May 7, 2005
- Episodes: 13
- Anime television series

Buzzer Beater II
- Directed by: Shigeyuki Miya
- Written by: Shundō Ōkawa
- Music by: Koichiro Kameyama
- Studio: TMS Entertainment
- Original network: Nippon TV
- Original run: July 4, 2007 – September 26, 2007
- Episodes: 13
- icon

Buzzer Beater (stylized in all caps) is a Japanese manga series written and illustrated by Takehiko Inoue. The series debuted as a webcomic in 1996 and it was also serialized in Shueisha's Monthly Shōnen Jump shortly after its introduction on the web. An anime television series adaptation produced by TMS Entertainment, released in 2005, followed by a second season in 2007.

== Characters ==
Hideyoshi Tanaka (田中 ヒデヨシ, Tanaka Hideyoshi)
Voiced by: Fujiko Takimoto
Hideyoshi wears jersey number 1 and plays as point guard. A 15-year-old orphan who previously survived through street basketball hustles, his exceptional speed earns him selection for the Earth All-Star team. During games and practice, he experiences debilitating migraines, later revealed by DT as symptoms of his half-Goran heritage manifesting through growing horns. His only connection to his unknown parents is a distinctive wristband made from elastic material exclusive to the planet Goru.
Cha-che (チャチェ)
Voiced by: Sanae Kobayashi
Cha-che wears jersey number 2 and plays as shooting guard. The granddaughter of team founder Yoshimune, she dedicates herself to fulfilling his dream of fielding an Earthling team capable of winning the Intergalactic League. Her exceptional shooting ability earns her roster spot after making a half-court shot during a challenge match. During the opening game against the Swallows, she scores two 10-point baskets, demonstrating her sharpshooting skills that later prove crucial in overcoming the Smoky Queen.
DT
Voiced by: Yūji Ueda
DT wears jersey number 9 and serves as point guard and captain of the team, recognized as Earth's top player at his position. His self-given nickname references his ability to induce a "dream time" state in opponents and teammates through his exceptional speed and playmaking. A former Goran who removed his emerging horns during adolescence, he conceals the resulting scars with a signature skull cap. He maintains a friendly rivalry with teammate Hideyoshi.
Ivan (イワン)
Voiced by: Tetsu Inada
The player wearing jersey number 55 serves as power forward. Despite being 15 years old, his physical maturity features broad shoulders and an adult-like physique. He first encounters Hideyoshi during team selection trials and holds recognition as State R's premier shot-blocker.
Maru (マル)
Voiced by: Jūrōta Kosugi
The player wearing jersey number 7 serves as shooting guard, renowned in the JBA as a "shooting android" for his exceptional accuracy. After missing crucial free throws during a decisive match, he undergoes intensive physical and mental training. While struggling against the Smoky Kings, he becomes instrumental in subsequent victories. Off the court, he demonstrates deep devotion to his children.
Mo (モー)
Voiced by: Jouji Nakata
The player wearing jersey number 35 serves as center. A former sumo wrestler, he dominates the paint with his imposing physique and rebounding ability.
Rose (ローズ, Rōzu)
Voiced by: Daisuke Fujita
The player wearing jersey number 8 plays as point guard. Known for his distinctive purple attire, his competitive performance suffers due to temperament issues. An injury prevents his participation in the match against the Swallows.
Lazuli (ラズーリ, Razūri)
Voiced by: Yū Asakawa
The player wearing jersey number 21 plays as small forward. Initially captain of the Smoky Queens, a Goran team known for aggressive tactics in the Underground League, she joins Yoshimune's team after their defeat. She holds admiration for Apiru, the Swallows' star player.
Han (ハン)
Voiced by: Ryūsei Nakao
The player wears jersey number 12 (5 in the anime adaptation) while playing as both point guard and small forward. Standing tall enough to play center—second only to Mo in height—he earns his place on Earth's team through elegant ball-handling skills. He remains composed during the point guard competition against DT though unable to fully demonstrate his abilities, and later plays small forward against the Swallows.
Yoshimune (ヨシムネ)
Voiced by: Takkō Ishimori
Yoshimune, a 77-year-old millionaire, finances and organizes Earth's basketball team to compete in the Intergalactic League. Despite his age, he maintains an active role in team operations, personally supervising training sessions and game strategies.
Liz Murdoch (リズ・マードック, Rizu Mādokku)
Voiced by: Masako Katsuki
Liz is the coach for the Earth team, and is half Goran. Her father, Mr. Murdoch, is the Goran president of the Intergalactic Basketball League.

== Media ==
=== Webcomic ===
Inoue launched Buzzer Beater as an online comic in May 1996 on the Sports-i ESPN website (later J Sports). It was his second manga to focus on basketball, following Slam Dunk. The name of the manga comes from the term used for when a basket is scored at the same moment a period or the game itself ends. Buzzer Beater was published in print format by Shueisha shortly after it began, as it was serialized in its Monthly Shōnen Jump manga magazine from February 1997 to August 1998. The manga was collected in four wideban volumes, released from July 4, 1997, to August 4, 1998. It was later republished in two volumes, released on February 4, 2005.

In May 2021, Manga Planet announced that they licensed the series for English digital release starting in June of the same year.

=== Anime ===
Buzzer Beater is Inoue's second manga series to have been adopted into an anime. An anime series adaptation produced by TMS Entertainment, aired on WOWOW from February 5 to May 7, 2005. The second season aired on Nippon Television from July 4 to September 26, 2007. Both anime adaptations were supervised by Inoue. The anime series includes story elements, and characters that were either hinted at or did not originally appear in the manga.
