= Pepita: Takehiko Inoue Meets Gaudí =

2013 travel memoir by Takehiko Inoue

- Cover of the English edition, featuring an illustration by Inoue of Gaudí as a boy
- Author: Takehiko Inoue
- Original title: pepita 井上雄彦 meets ガウディ
- Translator: Emi Louie-Nishikawa
- Language: English
- Genre: Travel memoir, Biography
- Publisher: Viz Media
- Publication date: 2013
- Publication place: Japan
- Media type: Print (hardcover)
- Pages: 108
- ISBN: 978-1421552743

Pepita: Takehiko Inoue Meets Gaudí (pepita 井上雄彦 meets ガウディ) is a 2013 illustrated biographical travel memoir by Japanese manga artist Takehiko Inoue on the life and work of the Catalan Modernist architect Antoni Gaudí. The work details Inoue's thoughts and travels in Catalonia as he explores the homes and architecture of Gaudí and speaks with experts on the architect's life.

== Background ==
In 1992, Inoue was traveling in Spain to watch the United States "Dream Team" compete in the Barcelona Olympics. While there, he visited some of Gaudí's main buildings, and felt overwhelmed at the sight of the Sagrada Familia.

== Content ==
Twenty years after his first visit, Inoue was invited by Nikkei BP to revisit Barcelona accompanied by experts, including architect Tanaka Hiroya, in order to explore Gaudí's life, creative process, and the idea of genius. During the trip, Inoue also held long conversations with the sculptors, carvers, and other craftsmen involved in finishing the Sagrada Familia. Inoue made a third trip to Catalonia, visiting the rural land where Gaudí grew up and was first afflicted with arthritis.

Inoue notes the visual similarities between the Montserrat and some of Gaudí's modernist shapes, beginning the book with the mountain's natural beauty before moving on to Gaudí's respect for nature, family of craftsmen, later life, and legacy.
