= Real (manga) =

Japanese manga series

- First tankōbon volume cover, featuring Tomomi Nomiya

リアル (Riaru)
- Genre: Drama; Sports
- Manga
- Written by: Takehiko Inoue
- Published by: Shueisha
- English publisher: NA: Viz Media
- Imprint: Young Jump Comics
- Magazine: Weekly Young Jump
- Original run: October 28, 1999 – present
- Volumes: 17
- icon

Real (Japanese: リアル, Hepburn: Riaru; stylized as REAL) is a Japanese wheelchair basketball-themed manga series written and illustrated by Takehiko Inoue. It has been serialized in Shueisha's seinen manga magazine Weekly Young Jump since October 1999, with the chapters collected into 17 tankōbon volumes as of April 2026. The series has been irregularly published in the magazine. In North America, the series is licensed for English release by Viz Media.

By November 2020, the manga had over 16 million copies in circulation. In 2001, Real won an Excellence Award at the fifth Japan Media Arts Festival.

== Plot ==
The story revolves around three teenagers: Nomiya Tomomi, a high school dropout, Togawa Kiyoharu, an ex-sprinter who now plays wheelchair basketball and Takahashi Hisanobu, a popular leader of the high school's basketball team who now finds himself a paraplegic after an accident.

Real features a cast of characters who find themselves being marginalized by society, but are all united by one common feature: a desire to play basketball, with no place to play it in. Nomiya, being a high school dropout, has no future in his life. Togawa, being a difficult personality, finds himself constantly feuding with his own teammates. Takahashi, once a popular team leader, now finds himself being unable to move from the chest down. Real also deals with the reality of physical disabilities, and the psychological inferiority that the characters struggle against. The characters break through their own psychological barriers bit by bit.

== Characters ==
=== Main characters ===
The three main characters of the series (from left to right): Hisanobu Takahashi, Kiyoharu Togawa, and Tomomi Nomiya

Kiyoharu Togawa (戸川 清春, Togawa Kiyoharu)
Kiyoharu Togawa, a junior high student forced into piano practice, nearly defeats his school's fastest runner in a race, sparking his dream of becoming Japan's top sprinter. After losing his right leg to osteosarcoma, he withdraws until meeting Tora, a mentor with the same disability, who introduces him to wheelchair basketball through the Tigers. His relentless competitiveness strains team dynamics, leading to a brief departure and later a mutiny. When recruited by Japan's national team and the rival Dream, tensions escalate. Tomomi Nomiya, impressed by his skill, dubs him "Vince" after NBA star Vince Carter.
Tomomi Nomiya (野宮 朋美, Nomiya Tomomi)
Tomomi Nomiya, a high school dropout with delinquent tendencies, carries guilt over causing a traffic accident that paralyzed Yamashita Yasumi. Once passionate about basketball but excluded from his school team, he finds new purpose after encountering Kiyoharu playing wheelchair basketball. Becoming the Tigers' enthusiastic supporter, he bonds with Kiyoharu though rarely playing himself. After failing to join a professional team despite a strong tryout, he grows disillusioned and gains weight. Seeking redemption, he shaves his head and adopts a monk-like determination that gradually inspires those around him.
Hisanobu Takahashi (高橋 久信, Takahashi Hisanobu)
Hisanobu Takahashi, a high school basketball captain and top student, becomes paralyzed after a bicycle accident. His rigid worldview, which classifies people from A (best) to E (worst), collapses as he now considers himself inferior. Though briefly motivated by Tomomi's visit, he gives up upon realizing his paralysis is permanent, lashing out at his mother. A tense reunion with his estranged father forces him to confront long-held resentment. Later inspired by Shiratori, he attempts to join the Dreams wheelchair basketball team.

=== Supporting characters ===
Fumika Honjo (本城 ふみか, Honjō Fumika)
Fumika Honjo visits Hisanobu in the hospital following his accident. Though Hisanobu rates her as merely a "C" in his personal ranking system, she remains committed to their relationship despite his paralysis. She shares how her dog Angelina will also require wheelchair assistance, using this example to argue that disability doesn't render life meaningless.
Kumi Azumi (安積 久美, Azumi Kumi)
Kumi Azumi, a childhood friend of Kiyoharu, serves as manager for the Tigers. While attending driving school with Tomomi, she explains she's obtaining her license to transport Kiyoharu to team activities. Yama's comments about their compatibility as a couple create tension between Kumi and Kiyoharu, who remains silent about his feelings. Tomomi develops romantic interest in Kumi during their time together.
Hitoshi Yamauchi (山内 仁史, Yamauchi Hitoshi)
Hitoshi Yamauchi, known as Yama (ヤマ), is a former Tigers player with a progressive muscular condition (possibly Duchenne dystrophy) and a life expectancy not exceeding age 20. When Kiyoharu meets him two years after his amputation, Yama's carpe diem philosophy proves inspirational. As Yama's condition worsens and his attitude darkens, Kiyoharu reaffirms his value by calling him a "hero".
Mitsuru Nagano (長野 満, Nagano Mitsuru)
Mitsuru Nagano, a tall Japanese wheelchair basketball player studying at New South Wales University, defeats Kiyoharu and Tomomi in a street basketball game—Kiyoharu's first loss to another wheelchair player. His Australian-influenced speech patterns (frequently using "mate") and competitive ability motivate Kiyoharu to rejoin the Tigers. Impressed by Kiyoharu's skills, Mitsuru eventually joins the post-mutiny team.
Hisayuki Takahashi (高橋 久行, Takahashi Hisayuki)
Hisanobu's father, a former salaryman who worked long hours, first introduced his son to basketball by building a backboard and teaching him fundamentals. Their shared games became central to young Hisanobu's life before his father abruptly left the family eight years prior, abandoning corporate life to become a rural potter. Following Hisanobu's paralysis, his father returns to assume caretaker responsibilities, persistently countering his son's bitterness with steadfast support.
Kiyoharu's father
Following his wife's death, Kiyoharu's father—an unathletic former pianist—devotes himself to training his son as a piano prodigy. Though initially disappointed when Kiyoharu abandons piano for track, he eventually supports this decision. After Kiyoharu's amputation, his father's actions unintentionally contribute to his son's isolation during recovery.

== Publication ==
Written and illustrated by Takehiko Inoue, Real started in Shueisha's seinen manga magazine Weekly Young Jump on October 28, 1999. (Note: It started in the magazine's 48th issue of 1999, released on October 28 of that same year.) Its chapters have been collected by Shueisha into individual tankōbon volumes, with the first one published on March 19, 2001. As of April 17, 2026, 17 volumes have been published. After an indefinite hiatus started in 2014, the series resumed on May 23, 2019; since then, the series has been published sporadically.

In North America, the series is licensed for English language release by Viz Media, who announced the acquisition in November 2007. The first volume was released on July 15, 2008.

=== Volumes ===
No.	Original release date	Original ISBN	English release date	English ISBN
1	March 19, 2001	978-4-08-876143-5	July 15, 2008	978-1-4215-1989-0
Chapters 1–6
2	September 19, 2002	978-4-08-876340-8	October 28, 2008	978-1-4215-1990-6
Chapters 7–12
3	October 17, 2003	978-4-08-876511-2	January 20, 2009	978-1-4215-1991-3
Chapters 13–18
4	November 19, 2004	978-4-08-876695-9	April 21, 2009	978-1-4215-1992-0
Chapters 19–24
5	November 18, 2005	978-4-08-876882-3	July 21, 2009	978-1-4215-1993-7
Chapters 25–30
6	November 17, 2006	978-4-08-877173-1	October 20, 2009	978-1-4215-1994-4
Chapters 31–36
7	November 29, 2007	978-4-08-877352-0	January 19, 2010	978-1-4215-3070-3
Chapters 37–42
8	October 29, 2008	978-4-08-877539-5	April 20, 2010	978-1-4215-3071-0
Chapters 43–48
9	November 26, 2009	978-4-08-877762-7	November 16, 2010	978-1-4215-3788-7
Chapters 49–54
10	November 26, 2010	978-4-08-879060-2	November 15, 2011	978-1-4215-4051-1
Chapters 55–60
11	November 11, 2011	978-4-08-879232-3	November 20, 2012	978-1-4215-4331-4
Chapters 61–66
12	November 22, 2012	978-4-08-879456-3	October 15, 2013	978-1-4215-5840-0
Chapters 67–72
13	November 22, 2013	978-4-08-879716-8	November 18, 2014	978-1-4215-7341-0
Chapters 73–78
14	December 19, 2014	978-4-08-890077-3	March 15, 2016	978-1-4215-8221-4
Chapters 79–84
15	November 19, 2020	978-4-08-891618-7	December 21, 2021	978-1-9747-2460-4
Chapters 85–90
16	August 19, 2024	978-4-08-893409-9	October 28, 2025	978-1-9747-5864-7
Chapters 91–96
17	April 17, 2026	978-4-08-894241-4	—	—
Chapters 97–102

=== Chapters not yet in tankōbon format ===
- Chapters 103–106

== Reception ==
By November 2013, Real had 14 million copies in circulation. By November 2020, the manga had over 16 million copies in circulation. The sixteenth volume had an initial print run of 250,000 copies, making it Shueisha's 15th-highest first-print manga volume of 2024–2025 (period from April 2024 to March 2025).

Real received an Excellence Award in the Manga Division at the fifth Japan Media Arts Festival in 2001. The committee noted that while Inoue was already well known for his basketball series Slam Dunk, Real explored the novel theme of wheelchair basketball. The committee reported anticipating the next installments, and while they awarded it the Excellence Prize, they remarked it would not have been surprising if Inoue had won the Grand Prize for a second consecutive year following his success with Vagabond.

David P. Welsh of The Comics Reporter observed that all the skills Inoue demonstrated in Slam Dunk had evolved further in Real, concluding that its emotional content was presented with a poise and certainty he found remarkable. The series was praised for its realism and for breaking away from conventional portrayals of disabled individuals as uniformly weak or innocent. Wheelchair basketball player Kazuyuki Kyoya endorsed the series, expressing his impression with its call for understanding of people with various disabilities and its elaborately expressed rehabilitation scenes. Deb Aoki of About.com listed Real as the best new manga of 2008.
