= Cornell Paper =

1971 political publication by Benedict Anderson

A Preliminary Analysis of the October 1, 1965, Coup in Indonesia
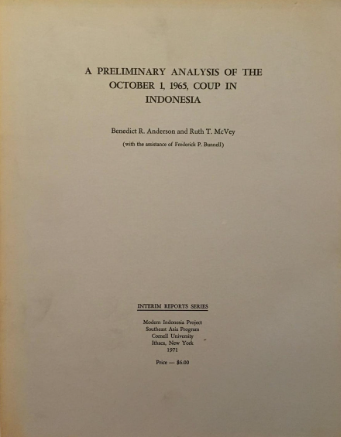
- Author: Benedict Anderson and Ruth McVey
- Language: English
- Subject: Political history
- Publisher: Cornell Modern Indonesia Project
- Publication date: 1971
- Publication place: United States
- Media type: Print (paperback)
- Pages: 162 pp
- OCLC: 210798

A Preliminary Analysis of the October 1, 1965, Coup in Indonesia, more commonly known as the "Cornell Paper", is an academic publication detailing the events of an abortive coup d'état attempt by the self-proclaimed September 30 Movement, produced on January 10, 1966. The study was written by Benedict Anderson and Ruth McVey, with the help of Frederick Bunnell, using information from various Indonesian news sources. At the time of writing, the three were members of Cornell University's network of graduate students and scholars on Southeast Asia.

In their work, Anderson and McVey theorized that neither the Communist Party of Indonesia (PKI) nor President Sukarno took part in organizing the operation; instead, they became the victims. On the basis of the material available, they proposed that the coup was indeed an "internal army affair" as was claimed by the September 30 Movement to remove members of the Indonesian Army General Staff who allegedly worked with the U.S. Central Intelligence Agency. By the end of the following week, the movement had been crushed by forces of Major General Suharto, who was charged with the sole responsibility of restoring order. Several alternatives to their theory were also presented and disputed, including the official government account that the PKI had masterminded the coup attempt.

Although the paper was intended to be kept confidential, information on its existence was eventually leaked in a March 5, 1966, article by The Washington Post journalist Joseph Kraft. Cornell turned down requests to access the paper, and its contents became subject to misinterpretation and forgery before publication. Requests made to the Indonesian government to supplement the study with additional documents pertaining to the incident were not fulfilled, and the paper was finally published in 1971 without any additional material. Since its publication, the "Cornell Paper" has been subject to further analysis and revision.

== Background ==
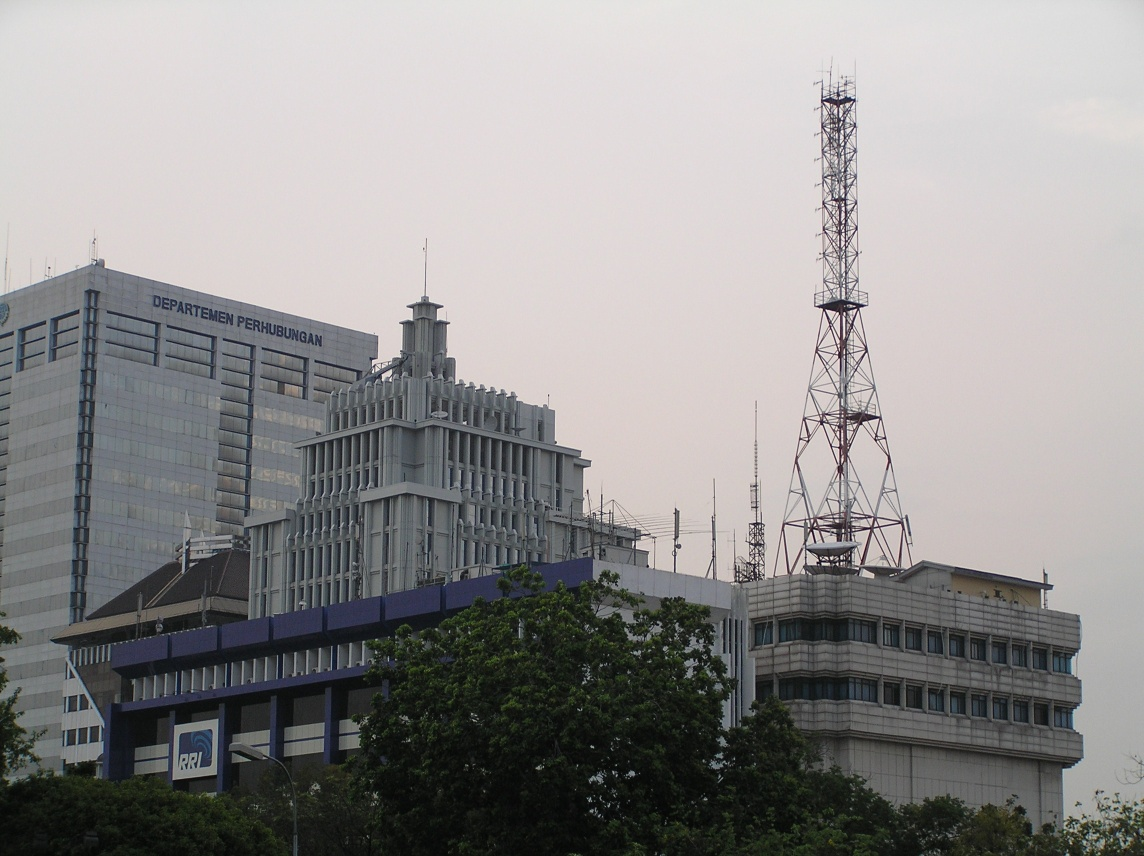
Headquarters of Radio Republik Indonesia in Jakarta

At approximately 7:15 a.m. local time on October 1, 1965, an announcement was made over the airwaves of Radio Republik Indonesia in the capital city of Jakarta that the self-proclaimed September 30 Movement overnight prevented a coup d'état attempt by the Council of Generals, an alleged "subversive movement" sponsored by the U.S. Central Intelligence Agency. Led by Lieutenant Colonel Untung Syamsuri of the Tjakrabirawa, the Presidential Guard, the movement arrested members of the Council of Generals and assumed control of media and communication outlets. It also claimed to have President Sukarno under its protection. Untung then declared the creation of the Indonesian Revolution Council, composed of civilian and military personnel to support the movement and to "safeguard the Indonesian Republic from the wicked deeds of the Council of Generals and its agents".

George McTurnan Kahin, a leading expert on Southeast Asia and director of Cornell University's Modern Indonesia Project, recounted how he learned of the announcement:

I accepted [an interview with a Boston radio station in September 1965], and it was then that from my absorption with the Vietnam War I was abruptly pulled back into the orbit of Indonesia [...] To my surprise, the radio official informed me that shortly before he'd left the station [...] a report had come in that there had been a military coup in Indonesia [...] I had not been closely following events in Indonesia, but, even if I had, I would have been utterly surprised at this turn of events in a country that I thought I knew reasonably well.

— George McTurnan Kahin, Southeast Asia: A testament, p. 178

When Kahin returned to Cornell, graduate students and Indonesia specialists Benedict Anderson and Frederick Bunnell had begun working with Ruth McVey, a 1961 graduate and research fellow at the university's Center for International Studies, to gather information on the coup. Using Cornell's collection of national and provincial Indonesian newspapers and by listening to radio broadcasts from the country, Anderson and McVey began writing their findings and analysis. A "very tentative" 162-page summary and analysis of the events was completed on January 10, 1966, and was titled A Preliminary Analysis of the October 1, 1965, Coup in Indonesia.

== Work and summary ==
According to Anderson, the report places emphasis on two aspects of Indonesian politics previously unexplored by scholars of the country. The first aspect is the political involvement of the Indonesian military in transforming itself from a "decentralized, popular guerrilla force into a more professional centralized ruling group". The volatility of the military had previously contributed to several internal and national crises, including a 1958 rebellion movement. The study also develops a unique political perspective that analyzes the "frequently antagonistic interaction" between the metropolitan elite of the capital city and more isolated provincial capitals. Anderson acknowledged that he and McVey placed a considerable amount of attention on events in Central Java "at the expense of other provinces as well as the capital city". Additionally, they lacked an understanding of the internal politics of the Indonesian National Police and other military branches that took part in the crisis.

Kahin "found [himself] in disagreement with some of the views presented in this paper"; however, he called the work a "tour de force" for providing an "impressive analysis" of the events despite the limited amount of access to information. In his view, Anderson's and McVey's work "contains a number of important insights and a considerable amount of significant data which other writers have not taken into account".

In the opening paragraph of the synopsis of the study's results, Anderson and McVey outlined their tentative conclusions:

The weight of the evidence so far assembled and the (admittedly always fragile) logic of probabilities indicate that the coup of October 1, 1965, was neither the work of the PKI [Communist Party of Indonesia] nor of Sukarno himself. Though both were deeply involved, it was after the coup plans were well under way. They were more the victims than the initiators of events. The PKI was entangled before it knew what was happening; Sukarno mistakenly attempted to take advantage of the situation created by the deaths of six of his top Generals. The actual originators of the coup are to be found not in Djakarta, but in Central Java, among middle-level Army officers in Semarang, at the Headquarters of the Seventh (Diponegoro) Territorial Division.

— Benedict Richard O'Gorman Anderson and Ruth Thomas McVey, "Synopsis of the Coup Analysis", A Preliminary Analysis of the October 1, 1965, Coup in Indonesia

=== Interpretation of events ===
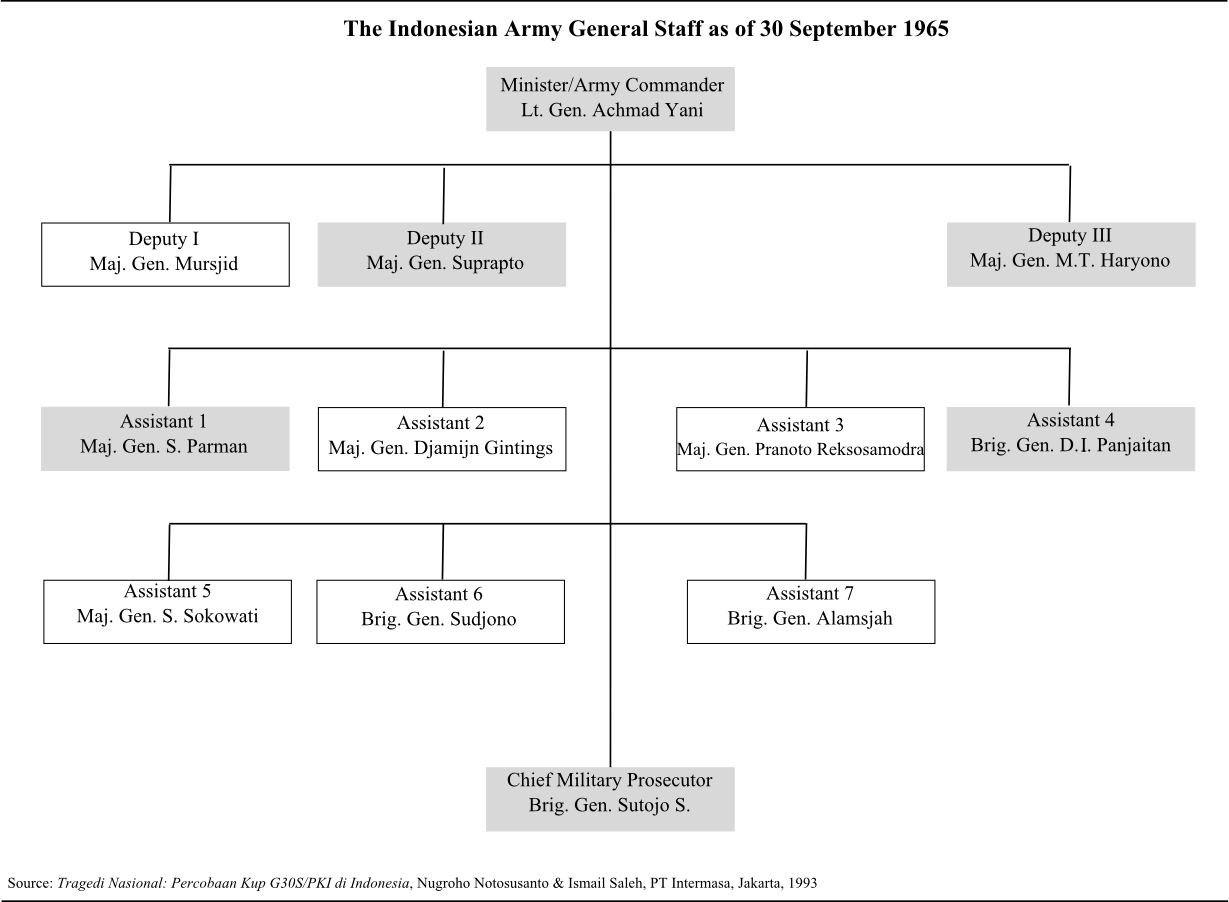
The Army General Staff at the time of the coup attempt. The names of the generals killed are shown in gray.

The Diponegoro Division, according to Anderson and McVey, comprised a greater percentage of ethnic Javanese people than other units in the Indonesian Army. Compared to neighboring West Java and East Java, the region of Central Java, where the Diponegoro Division was headquartered, experienced a more traditional culture. Because the region "has been for centuries the seat of political power in Java", residents believed that its position "has been usurped by Djakarta". This inequality resulted in a hostility between officers who held traditional Javanese values and the revolutionary movement in high esteem and officers of the Army General Staff who were more "intellectual" and educated in the ways of the Dutch. Anderson and McVey observed that the more traditional officers believed "soldiering itself is less a matter of techniques and skills, than the development of moral and spiritual faculties through a kind of modernized asceticism". Officers of the Diponegoro Division had a number of sympathizers throughout several military branches inside and outside the capital city, including Lieutenant Colonel Untung Syamsuri of the presidential guard. Fueled by rumors that members of the General Staff had been working with the U.S. Central Intelligence Agency, a group of officers from the Diponegoro Division plotted to conduct a series of raids to kidnap members of the General Staff to either be held as hostages or killed. They believed that President Sukarno, whom Untung would warn of an impending coup by the Army General Staff, would be persuaded to support the Diponegoro coup group while the Army was "too decimated in its top leadership to do anything but acquiesce".

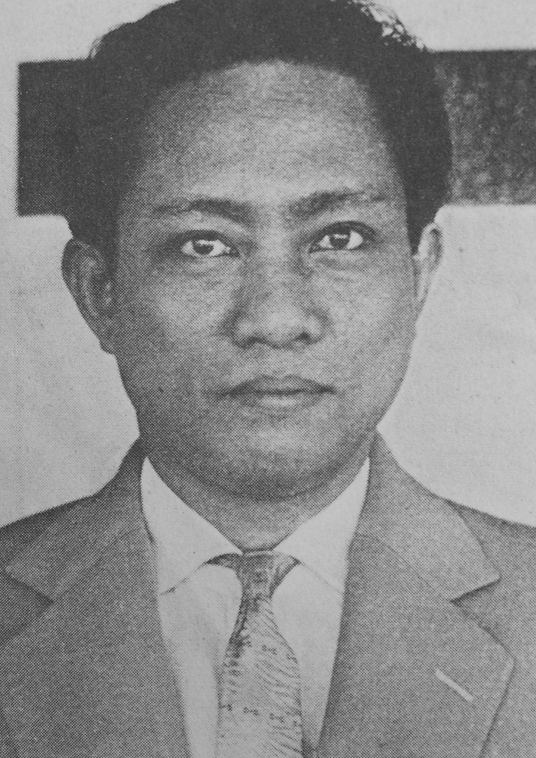
D. N. Aidit, chairman of the Communist Party of Indonesia and a political ally of President Sukarno

The officers understood that "the one occasion in the year when Diponegoro troops could legitimately be in Djakarta was the annual parade and demonstration put on by paratroop, cavalry, armor and other units for Armed Forces Day October 5". After securing a number of supporters in the Indonesian Air Force, the officers decided to utilize Halim Perdanakusuma Air Force Base as the location to which Sukarno would be evacuated. Additionally, they enlisted the help of Communist radical youths in order to secure military installations across the city. Anderson and McVey theorized that the night of Thursday, September 30, was chosen for the operation because it is a time of the week when, "in universal Javanese belief, magical forces are abroad, and spiritual strength and support most readily obtained". They further discovered evidence that at least two "prominent leaders" other than Sukarno were evacuated to Halim Perdanakusuma: Air Force Commander Omar Dani and PKI Chairman Dipa Nusantara Aidit. Anderson and McVey suggested that Aidit's presence would "prove to the President that the PKI was inextricably compromised in the affair, and therefore that if he wished to preserve his 'leftward course', [...] he had no alternative but to come out" against the Council of Generals. Anderson and McVey emphasized that in the announcement made on the morning of October 1, "Untung repeatedly stressed that the September 30th Movement was purely and simply an internal Army affair". As such, the movement did not find it necessary to "impose any form of press control, nor indeed any particular mobilization of the press". In the announcement, Untung asserted that all "political parties, mass organizations, newspapers, and periodicals may continue functioning" until it became necessary for them to "declare their loyalty to the Indonesian Revolution Council".

Seeking to seize the political initiative, Sukarno refused to make any decision until he was allowed contact with political friends and advisors. With no reason to doubt Sukarno or their control of Jakarta, Untung and his men allowed the President to communicate via couriers. One such courier delivered a message read over Radio Republik Indonesia (RRI) at 1:15 p.m. that Sukarno was not a prisoner of Untung's movement, which "carried far more weight than anything that Untung himself could say" because the statement was issued with the signature of the President's security chief. Couriers were also sent to Major Generals Pranoto Reksosamudra and Umar Wirahadikusumah summoning them to Halim Perdanakusuma for discussions on a new Army leadership. One courier found his way to Major General Suharto, who had assumed command of the Army and whom Sukarno wanted to avoid because of his "independent-mindedness and powerful personality". He refused to allow either Umar or Pranoto leave for Halim Perdanakusuma, and, Anderson and McVey believed, Sukarno then realized "Suharto would probably suspect him of having engineered the whole thing". After seizing control of the RRI station and securing the capital, Suharto issued an ultimatum to Untung's group at Halim Perdanakusuma. Refusing to follow Untung for a final stand at the Diponegoro Division headquarters in Central Java, Sukarno retreated to Bogor Palace where he was placed in the custody of the Army. Although Sukarno was not allowed to make any personal broadcasts, Suharto announced that the Army remained loyal to the President. He eventually agreed to give Major General Suharto "sole responsibility for restoring security and order". By October 5, the Army had ended all resistance movements in Central Java.

[...] We the People can fully comprehend what Lt. Col. Untung has asserted in carrying out his patriotic movement. But however the case may be, this is an internal Army affair. On the other hand, we the People who are conscious of the policy and duties of the revolution are convinced of the correctness of the action taken by the September 30th Movement to preserve the revolution and the People. [...]

— Harian Rakjat editorial, October 2, 1965

On October 2, the PKI newspaper Harian Rakjat published an editorial that would eventually be used as evidence that the Communists had organized the coup attempt by Untung and his group. Anderson and McVey noted that the Harian Rakjat "prided itself on well written and cogently argued editorials", but the editorial in question "is no gem of style or clarity". They believed that the "foolish hesitant editorial" provided the Army an opportunity to place the blame of the coup on the PKI. Since the coup, Anderson and McVey noted that the Army's success in blaming the PKI was "both because of actual PKI involvement, however confused, and because all groups now in power wish to believe it, since for years they lived in growing fear of a possible PKI takeover". To conclude their observations of the events of and following the coup, Anderson and McVey asserted, "It is not the place here to go into the details of the anti-Communist campaign which developed in the wake of the Army coup of October 1." However, they believed that the coup itself and subsequent events formed "quite separate political phenomena" despite being "intimately related". Anderson and McVey believed this to be the case because of a three-week absence of violence that ended on October 21, when Communist youth elements clashed with the Army Para-Commando Regiment (Indonesian: Resimen Para Komando Angkatan Darat, abbreviated as RPKAD) in Boyolali Regency.

=== Alternative theories ===
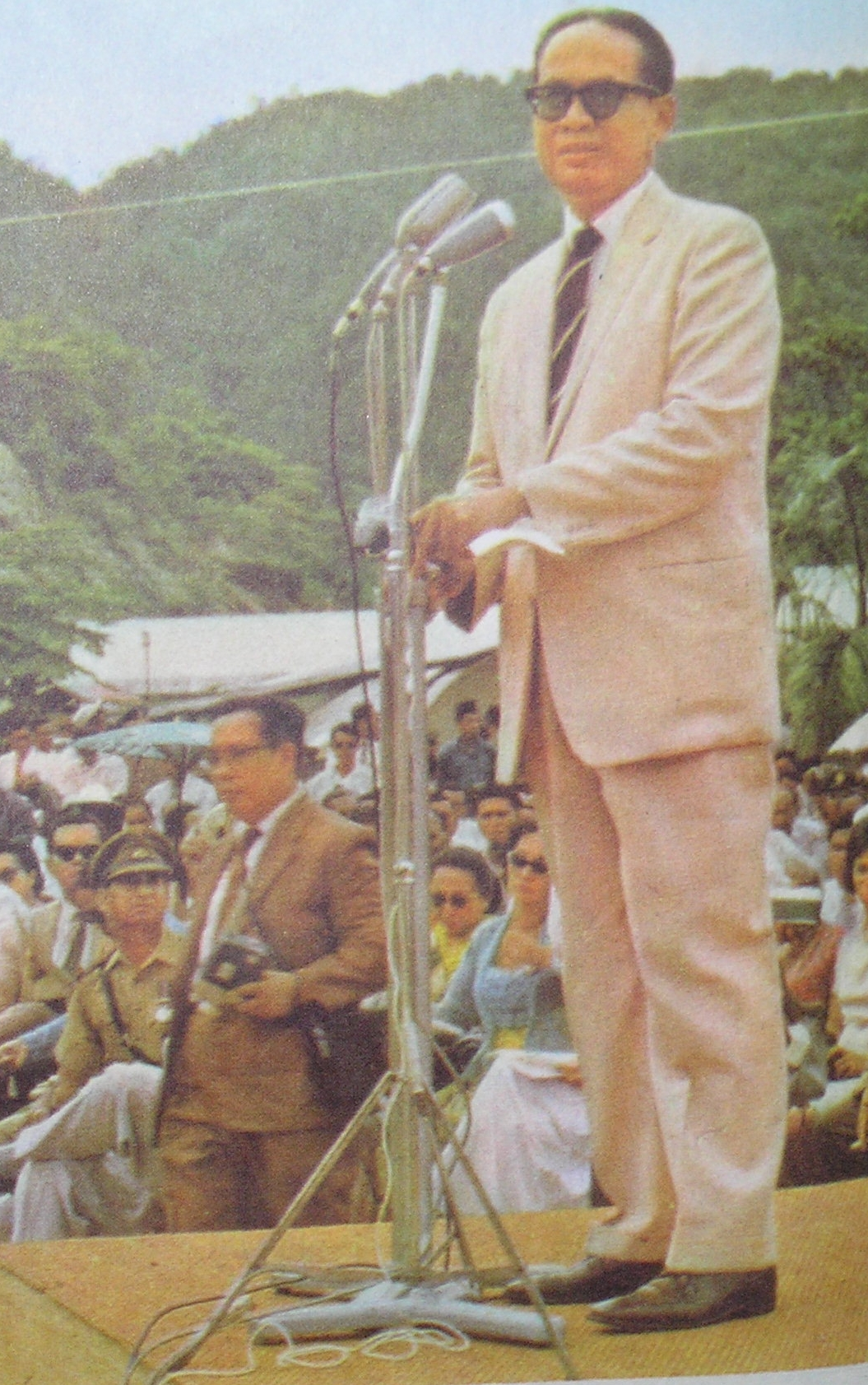
Foreign minister Subandrio was forced to resign and jailed for his alleged involvement with the PKI's attempt to take control of the government.

The first alternative interpretation of the events of October 1, 1965, was that of "a coup which would bring the Communists to power". It was used by the Indonesian military to blame the PKI (and, in some cases, foreign minister Subandrio) for attempting to create a puppet government that would eventually give way to PKI control. However, Anderson and McVey expressed their doubts that the PKI would consider using violence as a course of action as it "would have involved pitting itself against a vastly superior military force and might have thrown the President into alliance with the army". According to Anderson and McVey, they were presented with three possible motivations if this theory were true. The first was that the PKI had received information of Sukarno's failing health and feared that the military would purge the party after his death. However, the authors believed that such a preemptive move must be guaranteed that the information was accurate. If Sukarno did not die immediately following the coup, an alliance between the President and the military would prove disastrous for the party. Secondly, it was suggested that the Communist government of the People's Republic of China had pressured the PKI to undertake the operation after coming in conflict with the PKI's peaceful methods of gaining popular support. Anderson and McVey argued that "the Chinese have not been risk-takers, not have they been inclined to sacrifice promising relations with a non-Communist power in the interest of promoting a local revolution with dubious prospects". The final suggested motivation was that the PKI, in its Communist beliefs, was "driven by an overweening ambition and a congenital need to express itself in violence", which the authors asserted as "mythological" rather than "analytical". Anderson and McVey further disputed these proposals by reasoning that the PKI, which had built a positive image under the leadership of Dipa Nusantara Aidit, would not have gambled its position for the possibility of failure.

The second alternative to Anderson's and McVey's interpretation was that, instead of masterminding the operation, "[the PKI] played a role at one remove—by persuading the President, directly or indirectly, to attempt the removal en masse of his and their military enemies". The primary planning of the operation would then be conducted by Sukarno, motivated to remove Army General Staff members who opposed his idea of a "Nasakom" (Indonesian: Nasionalis, Agama, dan Komunis; English: Nationalist, Religious, and Communist) state. Anderson and McVey disputed this theory through analyzing the threat to Sukarno's leadership prior to the coup attempt, believing that "its major assumption—the failure of Sukarno to affect the political leadership of the military in the past few years—is doubtful". They further questioned as to why, instead of removing the generals as quickly as possible, the President chose to conduct the kidnappings "so crudely [...] from a political viewpoint". From Anderson's and McVey's perspective, "Sukarno placed himself compromisingly at Halim and spent all day there, floundering".

In ruling out the possibilities that Sukarno and/or the PKI organized the events of October 1, 1965, Anderson and McVey considered two additional alternatives. The first was an independent move by Untung and his movement to seize control and remove members of the Army General Staff for their "Western orientation", "Menteng mentality", and "obstruction of Sukarno's endeavors" without the desire for popular support. If Untung and his men did not want to involve the civilian movement to prevent its coup attempt from being thwarted by the Army, Anderson and McVey then believed Sukarno must have been a key figure. This was the final alternative, in which the President acted spontaneously after being spurred by Untung and his men to act against the Army General Staff without his knowing that rumors of an impending coup were false. Again, Anderson and McVey disputed this theory because in the case that Sukarno wanted to remove his opposition, "surely more generals would have been taken care of, particularly Suharto and [Umar Wirahadikusumah]".

== Reception ==
=== Circulation ===
We thought it important to circulate this interpretation even in its present incomplete state because the sponsorship we assign to the coup is not one that has usually been considered; and we feared that if we waited until a definitive history could be undertaken the tracks of this group, and others involved, might have been successfully wiped from the sands of time.

— Benedict Richard O'Gorman Anderson and Ruth Thomas McVey, "Memorandum", A Preliminary Analysis of the October 1, 1965, Coup in Indonesia

Anderson and McVey reproduced twenty copies of the paper using mimeographs and circulated them to both Cornell and non-Cornell scholars and officials requesting their commentary and criticism. Because of the sensitive nature of the document, they also requested that its contents be kept confidential. This decision was made after taking into consideration the safety of colleagues and former students conducting work in Indonesia for fear that they "could possibly be held accountable for the views expressed in the paper". Despite the authors' request, at least one copy of the paper was reproduced and circulated further, gaining notoriety as the "Cornell Paper".

The existence of the paper became public after The Washington Post's Joseph Kraft published an article on March 5, 1966, reporting the contents of "a study of recent Indonesian events by a group of scholars at Cornell University". Several days later, the Post published a letter from Kahin criticizing Kraft for going "considerably beyond a discussion of the events of early October to speculate on more recent developments". He explained that the paper was a "tentative attempt [...] to reconstruct the confusing events surrounding the coup" and "neither discussed nor hazarded judgment on any subsequent events". According to Kahin, the paper was frequently "misquoted, doctored, and misrepresented". Scholars and journalists who requested copies of the study from Cornell were turned down, but several received a four-page document titled Hypothesis on the Origin of the Coup Analysis and mistook it for the actual paper. Alternative versions of the paper's thesis were also published by Cornell graduate Daniel Lev in the February 1966 issue of the Asian Survey and by Lucien Rey in the British journal New Left Review the following month. In his 1969 book The Communist Collapse in Indonesia, author Arnold Brackman identified Lucien Rey as "a cover name for someone who, on the basis of the article's content, must have had access to at least one version of the 'Cornell Paper'."

As late as 1969, at Boston, at the meeting of the Association of Asian Studies and the newly formed Committee of Concerned Asian Scholars, panels on the September 30 affair were held in which none of the participants cited the "Cornell Paper", although we can again fairly assume that they were all cognizant of its existence. The failure to bring this situation into the open is unfair to the new student generation, to emergent scholars, and to the students participating in the Modern Indonesia Project who have had nothing to do with the Paper.

— Arnold Charles Brackman, The Communist Collapse in Indonesia, p. 186

In order to clear any misconception of the findings and to allow readers to assess the paper independently, it was finally published in its entirety by the Cornell Modern Indonesia Project in 1971. In observing the unstable political climate of Indonesia since the events of 1965, Kahin wrote in the preface to the publication, "It will probably be some time yet before a reasonably comprehensive and sound analysis can be written."

=== Indonesian response ===
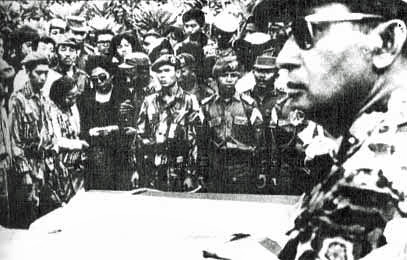
Major General Suharto at the funeral of five murdered generals on October 5, 1965

Under the direction of Nugroho Notosusanto of the Armed Forces History Centre, Indonesia published in 1966 its first account of the coup, "which was largely a consolidated version of Army propaganda setting out 'proof' that the coup attempt was a Communist plot". In 1967, Guy Pauker, an analyst of Indonesian affairs for the RAND Corporation informed the Army of the existence of the "Cornell Paper" and its proposed theories. According to University of Melbourne scholar Katharine E. McGregor, the U.S. government-sponsored RAND Corporation "clearly acted to help the New Order regime defend its version of the coup and hence its legitimacy". In conjunction with Lieutenant Colonel Ismail Saleh and Pauker, Nugroho worked to publish an English version of the Army's account during his visit to California in 1967. The foreword to the publication stated that it was written in response to "a campaign waged by certain circles in Western countries against the New Order government". The work itself argued that the coup attempt was not an internal military affair after taking into account the testimonies of PKI members made during a series of military trials.

When Kahin visited Indonesia in June 1967, he met with the intelligence officer responsible for coordinating the interrogation of political prisoners and formulating an official government account of the October 1, 1965, incident. Kahin requested "much more pertinent documentation" on the event in order to create a "fuller and more scholarly" report and analysis of the coup. He made a similar request to judge advocate general Kabul Arifin, and both men promised to provide the necessary materials for a more complete documentation. However, the documents were never provided by the government, and, despite a final request made by Kahin in 1971, the Cornell Modern Indonesia Project released Anderson's and McVey's report without the accompanying government account. Kahin believed that the promises made by the officials who conversed with him were "overruled by a higher authority". The Indonesian government also attempted to persuade Anderson to revise the findings of the study to match official accounts released by Suharto and his officers during visits to the country in 1967 and 1968. However, he questioned their accuracy and credibility.

In October 1975, ten years after the incident and after Suharto had become President, the Indonesian government sent a delegation of "military men and government intellectuals", led by intelligence officers Ali Murtopo and Benny Moerdani, to present a complete briefing of the coup and the events leading up to it. In a private meeting with Kahin, Anderson, McVey, and Bunnell, the delegation promised that it would promptly deliver documents requested for the past eight years after returning to Jakarta. On November 27, 1976, a delegation of Moerdani's men arrived with over 200 pounds of trial records of alleged conspirators of the coup but did not provide the requested documents. In response to Kahin's persistent requests and Anderson's resistance, the government subsequently placed the two on its blacklist and denied them entry into the country. Although Kahin's travel ban was lifted in 1991, Anderson was not able to enter Indonesia until 1999 following Suharto's resignation from office.

== Further development ==
As of 1971, five years after the alleged coup attempt, "no full-length scholarly study of the Affair ha[d] yet appeared".

In his 1978 book, National University of Malaysia scholar Harold Crouch found that "the testimony of PKI leaders at the [Mahkamah Militer Luar Biasa] (Special Military Court) trials as well as the opinions expressed by PKI émigré groups in Europe and elsewhere made the 'Cornell' thesis very difficult to defend in its original form". In reviewing these testimonies, Crouch asserted that the PKI undoubtedly took part in the events of 1965, but "the circumstances and extent of its involvement are still unclear".

== See also ==
- 30 September Movement
- Indonesian killings of 1965–1966
- Transition to the New Order
