= Takehiko Inoue =

Japanese manga artist (born 1967)

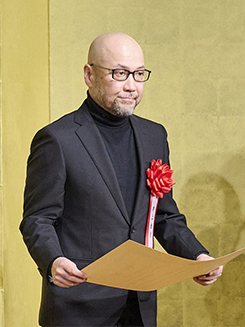
- Inoue in Tokyo, 2024
- Born: Takehiko Nariai; 12 January 1967 (age 59) Ōkuchi, Kagoshima, Japan
- Area: Manga artist
- Notable works: Slam Dunk; Vagabond; Real
- Awards: Tezuka Award (1988); Shogakukan Manga Award (1995); Kodansha Manga Award (2000); Tezuka Osamu Cultural Prize (2002)

Takehiko Inoue (井上 雄彦, Inoue Takehiko; born 12 January 1967) is a Japanese manga artist. He is best known for the basketball series Slam Dunk (1990–1996), and the jidaigeki manga Vagabond, which are two of the best-selling manga series in history. Many of his works are about basketball, Inoue himself being a huge fan of the sport. His works sold in North America through Viz Media are Slam Dunk, Vagabond and Real, although Slam Dunk was earlier translated by Gutsoon! Entertainment. In 2012, Inoue became the first recipient of the Cultural Prize at the Asia Cosmopolitan Awards. In 2024, Inoue received the MEXT Arts Encouragement Prize (Media Arts division).

== Early life and education ==
Inoue was born in Ōkuchi, now part of Isa, Kagoshima, and was fond of drawing since he was a child. During elementary and junior high school, Inoue joined the kendo and basketball clubs, becoming captain of the latter. In his third year at Kagoshima Prefectural Oguchi High School, Inoue took a summer course at an art preparatory school with the plan of enrolling into an art university, but such schools were too expensive so he ended up going to Kumamoto University near his hometown. There he majored in literature. His submission to Weekly Shōnen Jump caught the attention of editor Taizo Nakamura and, at the age of 20, Inoue dropped out of college to move to Tokyo and pursue a career as a manga artist.

== Career ==
Before his debut, Inoue was an assistant to Tsukasa Hojo on City Hunter. He made his debut in 1988, when Purple Kaede (楓パープル) appeared in Weekly Shōnen Jump magazine. It won the 35th annual Tezuka Award. His first serialization was in 1989 with Chameleon Jail, for which he was the illustrator of a story written by Kazuhiko Watanabe.

Inoue's first real fame came with his next manga, Slam Dunk, about a basketball team from Shohoku High School. It was published in Weekly Shōnen Jump from 1990 to 1996 and has sold over 170 million copies worldwide. In 1995 it received the 40th annual Shogakukan Manga Award for shōnen manga and in 2007 was declared Japan's favorite manga. Slam Dunk was adapted into a 101 episode anime television series and four films. The manga's popularity caused a surge of interest in basketball among Japanese youth, leading to Inoue and his publisher Shueisha creating the Slam Dunk Scholarship program in 2006 and Inoue receiving commendation from the Japan Basketball Association for helping popularize basketball in the country.

Inoue launched Buzzer Beater as an online comic in May 1996 on the Sports-i ESPN website (now J Sports). It is about a basketball team from Earth that attempts to compete on the intergalactic level, it appears on his official website in four languages: Japanese, English, Chinese, and Korean. Buzzer Beater was produced into a 13 episode anime series in 2005. In 2007, a second 13 episode series was produced. Both seasons were animated by TMS Entertainment.

Vagabond was Inoue's next manga, adapted from the fictionalized accounts by Eiji Yoshikawa of the samurai Miyamoto Musashi, which he began drawing in 1998. The series won the Kodansha Manga Award for General manga in 2000 and the Grand Prize of the 6th Osamu Tezuka Culture Awards in 2002, receiving his award alongside fellow mangaka, Kentaro Miura.

While still working on Vagabond, Inoue began drawing Real in 1999, his third basketball manga, which focuses on wheelchair basketball. It received an Excellence Prize at the 2001 Japan Media Arts Festival. Inoue also created character designs for the Xbox 360 RPG, Lost Odyssey, based on initial material provided by Hironobu Sakaguchi. Sakaguchi sought out Inoue for his talent of depicting "people" and his ability to "illustrate the internal emotions of a character" since the goal of the video game was to explain people.

In March 2011, Inoue painted large images of the Buddhist leader Shinran on twelve folding screens for display at the East Hongan Temple in Kyoto. The paintings include Shinran and Hōnen wading through water with a group of followers and an image Shinran with a bird.

In 2013, Inoue published an illustrated travel memoir on the life and architecture of Antoni Gaudí titled Pepita: Takehiko Inoue Meets Gaudí, detailing his thoughts and travels in Catalonia.

In 2013, Takehiko Inoue was appointed by the Japanese Foreign Ministry to serve as an ambassador to celebrate Japan and Spain 400 years of goodwill until July 31, 2014.

In 2022, Inoue made his directorial debut with the anime film adaptation of his Slam Dunk manga, titled The First Slam Dunk. Inoue also wrote the screenplay and story for the film. In 2024, he received the Best Director and Best Screenplay award for his work at the Tokyo Anime Award Festival. The First Slam Dunk was Japan's top-grossing domestic film of 2023, earning ¥15.74 billion ($112 million) and grossed about $281.1 million worldwide. It also won Animation of the Year at the 46th Japan Academy Film Prize.

In March 2024, he received the Minister of Education, Culture, Sports, Science and Technology's Fine Arts Award in the Media Arts division.

== Works ==
=== Serialized manga ===
- Chameleon Jail (1989–1990)
- Slam Dunk (1990–1996)
- Buzzer Beater (1996–1998)
- Vagabond (1998–2015)
- Real (1999–present)

=== Movies ===
- The First Slam Dunk (2022)

=== Video games ===
- 1 on 1 (1998)
- Lost Odyssey (2007)

=== Miscellaneous ===
- Pepita: Takehiko Inoue Meets Gaudí (2013)
