= Chameleon Jail =

Japanese manga series

- Cover of volume 1

カメレオン ジェイル (Kamerion Jeiru)
- Manga
- Written by: Kazuhiko Watanabe
- Illustrated by: Takehiko Inoue
- Published by: Shueisha
- Imprint: Jump Super Comics
- Magazine: Weekly Shōnen Jump
- Original run: July 31, 1989 – October 16, 1989
- Volumes: 2

Chameleon Jail (Japanese: カメレオン ジェイル, Hepburn: Kamerion Jeiru) is a Japanese manga series written by Kazuhiko Watanabe and illustrated by Takehiko Inoue, who is more well known for his subsequent manga, Slam Dunk. Chameleon Jail is Inoue's first manga series to be compiled in tankōbon form. It was first published in Shueisha's Weekly Shōnen Jump in Japan in 1989. The story centers on a "risk hunter" named Chameleon Jail, who thwarts and solves crimes by using a superhuman ability to change his appearance at will.

== Plot ==
"Risk hunters" are professionals who handle jobs considered too tough for normal law enforcement, such as kidnappings, combatting terrorism, and preventing murders. One man who stands above them all however is the legendary Chameleon Jail, who has the ability to manipulate his "kara" or internal human body energy in order to physically change his appearance into that of any other person. Throughout the series, he pursues several assignments on behalf of various clients given to him by Shall, a woman who runs a detective agency in New York City. All difficult, the successful completion of these assignments hinges on Jail's ability to change his appearance when the time is right.

== Characters ==
=== Main characters ===
Chameleon Jail

The protagonist and title character, Chameleon Jail or Jail as he more commonly goes by, is a Japanese risk hunter residing in New York City. In addition to manipulating his kara to alter his appearance, he can also channel it in order to change a target's sex from male to female. Part of his ability to manipulate his appearance also seems to entail being able to adopt the talents and skills practiced by those whom he imitates in order to further deceive his targets. However Jail can hold his own in most situations without resorting to using his kara manipulation, being a skilled fighter and marksman. Despite the high prices charged for his services, Jail has a sense of honor and a conscience. He also has goofy side and a weakness for food. He works between assignments as an itamae.

Shall

Shall is the female proprietor of a private detective agency in New York City who gives Jail his assignments and also assists him in completing them as best she can, functioning as his partner in a sense. She continuously promotes Jail as the best risk hunter in the business, and uses him once herself for an assignment.

=== Other characters ===
Chameleon Jail manipulates his "kara" to transform from a disguise he has assumed to his true self (right).

The following characters appear in story arcs more than one chapter long in Chameleon Jail.

Colonel Keith Burns

Colonel Keith as he is known as is a former Delta Force officer who is dying from a heart condition. Because of his stoic demeanor at the time of his wife's death and their frequent arguments, his son Jed believes that he did not love his wife and bears a grudge against him as a result.

Jed Burns

Jed Burns is Colonel Keith's son who harbors a grudge against his father following his mother's death at a young age. Seeking to get revenge by tarnishing his father's name, he becomes a terrorist and leads a group of hijackers who take control of an airliner, killing many of the hostages.

Camel

Camel is Gil's righthand man, who is responsible for kidnapping Kat Suri. He later attempts to kill Corey and Jail and assists in Jackal's attempt to steal an Incan golden idol by detonating explosives in the museum it is put on display in.

Corey

Corey is a New York Police Department detective who approaches Jail and Shall for help in bringing back his former lover Kat Suri. Corey has an allergy to women, breaking out in a rash when they are physically within a meter of him, and vomiting when they are right next to him. However Kat is the only woman who does not affect him in this way. Corey is chosen to lead the police team charged with stopping Jackal and Kat Suri specifically, from stealing a priceless Incan golden idol from a museum, causing intense inner conflict.

Gil

Gil is the current head of Jackal, a criminal organization that aims to steal a priceless Incan golden idol that will be put on display in a New York museum. He was an orphan who was taken in by Jackal as a young boy and raised as a thief alongside Kat Suri. He tries to prevent her from leaving Jackal by having her kidnapped and ordering Camel to kill Corey.

Kat Suri

Kat Suri is a highly skilled pickpocket who successfully uses her feminine wiles against her male targets. An orphan who was taken in at a young age by the criminal organization Jackal and trained as a thief, she is now considered the organization's best one. Kat initially used Corey to shelter her from three of her victims by lying to him, but grew to love him after he steadfastly defended her against them despite sustaining multiple injuries. She kept her true nature as a pickpocket secret from Corey and left him after he was promoted to detective.

Lawson

The chief of the NYPD who is personally involved with tracking down a few of Jail's targets, but is unsuccessful despite his best efforts.

== Publication ==
Chameleon Jail is written by Kazuhiko Watanabe and illustrated by Takehiko Inoue. It was serialized in Weekly Shōnen Jump from July 31 to October 16, 1989. The manga was compiled into two tankōbon volumes which also included three of Inoue's one shot manga stories, Purple Kaede, Flower Shōnen, and Like Jordan. Chameleon Jail was later rereleased as a single volume on November 19, 2004, which included another of Inoue's one shots, Baby Face.

=== Volume list ===
No.	Japanese release date	Japanese ISBN
1	December 10, 1989	4-420-13204-3
001. He's Chameleon Jail! (あいつがジェイルだ!, Aitsu ga Jeiru da!); 002. Midnight Mad Dog (真夜中の狂犬, Mayonaka no Kyōken); 003. Dream of a Doll (人魚の夢, Ningyo no Yume); 004. Jail's Imperial Wrath (ジェイル逆鱗, Jeiru Gekirin); 005. Working Madonna (part 1) (ウォーキング·マドンナ①, Uōkingu.Madonna1); 006. Working Madonna (part 2) (ウォーキング·マドンナ②, Uōkingu.Madonna2); Extra: Kaede Purple (楓パープル, Kaede Pāpuru)
2	February 9, 1990	4-420-13206-X
007. Working Madonna (part 3) (ウォーキング·マドンナ③, Uōkingu.Madonna3); 008. Working Madonna (part 4) (ウォーキング·マドンナ④, Uōkingu.Madonna4); 009. Working Madonna (part 5) (ウォーキング·マドンナ⑤, Uōkingu.Madonna5); 010. Working Madonna (part 6) (ウォーキング·マドンナ⑥, Uōkingu.Madonna6); 011. Don't Cry Daddy (part 1) (泣かないDaddy①, Naka Nai Daddy1); 012. Don't Cry Daddy (part 2) (泣かないDaddy②, Naka Nai Daddy2); Extra 1: Flower Shōnen (華SHONEN, Hana Shōnen); Extra 2: Like Jordan (JORDANみてーに, Jordan Mi Tēni)
