= Asia Cosmopolitan Awards =

Asia Cosmopolitan Awards is an international award established by Economic Research Institute for ASEAN and East Asia (ERIA) in the context of commemoration of the 1300-year anniversary in 2010 of Heijo-kyo (ancient capital of Japan located in present-day Nara) as the last destination of the ancient Silk Road and one of the first cosmopolitan cities in East Asia. It is awarded to individuals or organizations who have made substantial and significant contributions to the development and enrichment of the East Asian Community in the fields of cultural and economic integration, narrowing the developmental gaps, and establishing sustainably growing societies in the region.

== Outline and categories ==
The Asia Cosmopolitan Awards consists of three prizes: the Grand Prize, the Economic and Social Science Prize, and the Cultural Prize. Other prizes may be added as necessary. Main criteria for selection are as follows.

- Grand Prize: Awarded to an individual and/or organization making the most distinguished achievements in economic, social science, or cultural fields.
- Economic and Social Science Prize: Awarded to an individual and/or organization contributing to the betterment of Asia in the economic or social science fields through

eminent achievements in scholarly research, business innovation, industrial technology, smart consumption activities, security/safety, social security, politics, philosophy, or other general social sciences

- Cultural Prize: Awarded to an individual and/or organization contributing to the betterment of Asia in the cultural fields through eminent achievements in the arts, literature, content, cultural academic research or other cultural fields.

== The 1st Asia Cosmopolitan Awards Awardees ==
- Grand Prize: Supachai Panitchpakdi, Secretary General of the UN Conference on Trade and Development (UNCTAD)
- Economic and Social Science Prize: Benedict Anderson, Professor Emeritus at Cornell University
- Cultural Prize: Takehiko Inoue, Japanese Manga Artist
- Memorable Prize: The late Hadi Soesastro, Founder of the Centre for Strategic and International Studies (CSIS)

== The 2nd Asia Cosmopolitan Awards Awardees ==
- Grand Prize: Manmohan Singh, former Prime Minister of the Republic of India
- Economic and Social Science: Peter Drysdale, Emeritus Professor of Economics and Visiting Fellow, Crawford School of Economics and Government, the Australian National University; Wang Gungwu, University Professor, Faculty of Arts and Social Sciences, National University of Singapore and Emeritus Professor of Australian National University
- Cultural Prize: Rithy Panh, Cambodian Filmmaker; Takarazuka Revue Company, Japanese theatrical music company

== The 3rd Asia Cosmopolitan Awards (2016) Awardees ==
- Grand Prize: H.E. U Thein Sein, former President of the Republic of the Union of Myanmar
- Economic and Social Science: Professor Masahisa Fujita, Professor, Konan University, Project Professor, Institute of Economic Research, Kyoto University
- Cultural Prize: H.E. Prof Herman Van Rompuy, Haiku Ambassador for Japan-EU Friendship, President Emeritus of the European Council

== The 4th Asia Cosmolitan Awards (2017) Awardees ==
- Grand Prize: Yasuo Fukuda, former Prime Minister, Japan
- Economic and Social Science: Richard E. Baldwin, Professor of International Economics at the Graduate Institute in Geneva
- Cultural Prize: teamLab, Art Collective and Mieko Noguchi, Glass Artist
- Memorable Prize: Surin Pitsuwan (1949-2017), Former Secretary General of ASEAN

== See also ==
- List of economics awards
