= Ruth McVey =

Ruth Thomas McVey (born October 22, 1930) is an American scholar of Indonesia and Southeast Asia who has written on communism and the Indonesian Communist Party. In 1966, along with Benedict Anderson, she co-authored the Cornell Paper, which examined the failed September 30 Movement in Indonesia. She has written and edited books about Indonesian and Southeast Asian politics, including The rise of Indonesian communism in 1965 and The Soviet view of the Indonesian revolution in 1969.

== Early life and education ==
McVey was born in Allentown, Pennsylvania, on October 22, 1930. She attended Catasauqua High School, where she graduated in 1948. She then attended Bryn Mawr College, where she received a B.A. with a focus in Russian language in 1952. She then got a Fulbright scholarship to study at the University of Amsterdam. In 1954, she received a M.A. in political science from Harvard University, where she specialized on the Soviet Union.

== Career ==
She then attended Cornell University, where she studied Indonesia and participated in group of American academics who visited Jakarta to study the national politics of Indonesia starting in 1958. Other participants in the visit included Frederick Bunnell, Dan Lev, and Mary Somers. In 1961, she finished her PhD dissertation at Cornell titled "The Comintern and the Rise of Indonesian Communism." During that time she was also involved in the founding and operating of the journal Indonesia.

In the fall of 1965, when the failed September 30 Movement coup changed the trajectory of Indonesian politics and initiated a violent retaliation from the Indonesian military, she was a researcher at Cornell University's Modern Indonesia Project. Along with fellow Cornell scholar Benedict Anderson, and with research assistance from Fred Bunnell, she wrote one of the first major English-language analyses of the events, a 162-page report entitled A Preliminary Analysis of the October 1, 1965, Coup in Indonesia, known as the Cornell Paper. They wrote the paper at Cornell by studying newspaper reports coming out of Indonesia, radio broadcasts, and communications with friends who were still in the country. They finished the report in January 1966; although it was marked "confidential" and only meant to be circulated among colleagues, it was soon being widely reproduced and read by diplomats and even Indonesian army officers. The paper caused a diplomatic stir; McVey was accused by anti-communists of being sympathetic to the Indonesian Communist Party and Anderson was banned from entering Indonesia.

She later became increasingly disillusioned with the American role in the academic study of Southeast Asia and its focus on "development" in the context of the Cold War; she left Cornell for the SOAS University of London in 1969 due to her opposition to U.S. involvement in the Vietnam War. She later relocated to Montisi, Italy, where she lives on an olive oil farm.

== Selected publications ==
- Bibliography of Soviet Publications on Southeast Asia (1959)
- The rise of Indonesian communism (1965)
- Indonesia (1967, as editor)
- The Soviet view of the Indonesian revolution: a study in the Russian attitude towards Asian nationalism (1969)
- The social roots of Indonesian communism (1970)
- Southeast Asian capitalists (1992, as editor)
- Redesiging the Cosmos: Belief Systems and State Power in Indonesia (1993)
- Southeast Asia Studies: Reorientations (with Craig J. Reynolds, 1998)
- Money & power in provincial Thailand (2000, as editor)
