= Benedict Anderson =

Irish-American political scientist (1936–2015)

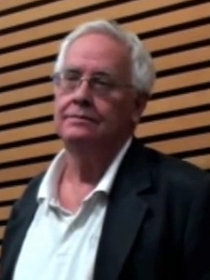
- Anderson in 2012
- Born: Benedict Richard O'Gorman Anderson; August 26, 1936; Kunming, Yunnan, Republic of China
- Died: December 13, 2015 (aged 79); Batu, East Java, Indonesia
- Citizenship: Ireland
- Education: King's College, Cambridge (BA); Cornell University (PhD)
- Known for: Imagined communities
- Scientific career
- Fields: Political science, historical science
- Workplaces: Cornell University (Professor Emeritus)
- Doctoral advisor: George McTurnan Kahin
- Doctoral students: John Sidel

Notes
- Brother of Perry Anderson

Benedict Richard O'Gorman Anderson (August 26, 1936 – December 13, 2015) was an Anglo-Irish political scientist and historian who lived and taught in the United States. Anderson is best known for his 1983 book Imagined Communities, which explored the origins of nationalism. A polyglot with an interest in Southeast Asia, he was the Aaron L. Binenkorb Professor of International Studies, Government & Asian Studies at Cornell University. His work on the "Cornell Paper" disputed the official story of Indonesia's 30 September Movement and the subsequent anti-Communist purges of 1965–1966 which led to his expulsion from that country. He was the elder brother of historian Perry Anderson.

== Biography ==
=== Background ===
Anderson was born on August 26, 1936, in Kunming, China, to an Irish and Anglo-Irish father and English mother. His father, James Carew O'Gorman Anderson, was an official with Chinese Maritime Customs. The family are descendants of the Anderson family of Ardbrake, Bothriphnie, Scotland, who settled in Ireland in the early 1700s. His mother's family originated in Lancaster.

Anderson's maternal grandfather Trevor Bigham was the Deputy Commissioner of the Metropolitan Police from 1914 to 1931. One of Anderson's grandmothers, Lady Frances O'Gorman, belonged to the Gaelic Mac Gormáin clan of County Clare and was the daughter of the Irish Home Rule MP Major Purcell O'Gorman. Major O'Gorman was the son of Nicholas Purcell O'Gorman who had been involved with the Republican Society of United Irishmen during the 1798 Rising, later becoming Secretary of the Catholic Association in the 1820s. Anderson also had roots in County Waterford through his O'Gorman side. Benedict Anderson took his middle names from the cousin of Major Purcell O'Gorman, Richard O'Gorman, who was one of the leaders of the Young Irelander Rebellion of 1848.

=== California, Ireland and Cambridge ===
Anderson's family moved to California in 1941 to avoid the Japanese invasion during the Second Sino-Japanese War and then to Ireland in 1945. He studied at Eton College, where he won the Newcastle Scholarship, and went on to attend King's College, Cambridge. While at Cambridge, he became an anti-imperialist during the Suez Crisis, which influenced his later work as a Marxist and anti-colonialist thinker.

=== Southeast Asia studies ===
Anderson earned a classics degree from Cambridge in 1957 before attending Cornell University, where he concentrated on Indonesia as a research interest and received his Ph.D. in government in 1967. His doctoral advisor at Cornell was Southeast Asian scholar George Kahin.

The violence following the September 1965 coup attempt that led to Suharto taking power in Indonesia disillusioned Anderson, who wrote that it "felt like discovering that a loved one is a murderer". Therefore, while Anderson was still a graduate student at Cornell, he anonymously co-wrote the "Cornell Paper" with Ruth T. McVey that debunked the official Indonesian government's accounts of the abortive coup of the 30 September Movement and the subsequent anti-Communist purges of 1965–66. The "Cornell Paper" was widely disseminated by Indonesian dissidents. One of two foreign witnesses at the show trial of Communist Party of Indonesia general secretary Sudisman in 1971, Anderson published a translated version of the latter's unsuccessful testimony. As a result of his actions, Anderson was in 1972 expelled from Indonesia and banned from reentering, a restriction that lasted until 1998 when Suharto resigned to be replaced by B. J. Habibie as president.

Anderson was fluent in many languages including Indonesian, Javanese, Thai and Tagalog, as well as the major European languages. After the American experience in the Vietnam War and the subsequent wars between Communist nations such as the Cambodian–Vietnamese War and the Sino-Vietnamese War, he began studying the origins of nationalism while continuing his previous work on the relationship between language and power.

Anderson is best known for his 1983 book Imagined Communities, in which he described the major factors contributing to the emergence of nationalism in the world during the past three centuries. He defined a nation as "an imagined political community [that is] imagined as both inherently limited and sovereign". Anderson was elected a Fellow of the American Academy of Arts and Sciences in 1994. In 1998, Anderson's return trip to Indonesia was sponsored by the Indonesian publication Tempo, and he gave a public speech in which he criticized the Indonesia opposition for "its timidity and historical amnesia—especially with regard to the massacres of 1965–1966".

Anderson taught at Cornell until his retirement in 2002 and subsequently became a professor emeritus of International Studies. After his retirement, he spent most of his time traveling throughout South East Asia.

=== Death ===
Anderson passed away in Batu, a hill town near Malang, Indonesia, in his sleep on December 13, 2015. According to close friend Tariq Ali, the cause of death was due to heart failure. He had been in the middle of correcting the proofs of his memoir A Life Beyond Boundaries, which had initially been published in Japanese translation. He is survived by his two adopted sons of Indonesian origin.

== Key concepts ==
=== Imagined communities ===
Anderson is best known for his 1983 book, Imagined Communities: Reflections on the Origin and Spread of Nationalism, in which he examined how nationalism led to the creation of nations, or as the title puts it, imagined communities. In this case, an "imagined community" does not mean that a national community is fake, but rather refers to Anderson's position that any community so large that its members do not know each another on a face-to-face basis must be imagined to some degree.

According to Anderson, previous Marxist and liberal thinkers did not fully appreciate nationalism's power, writing in his book that "Unlike most other isms, nationalism has never produced its own grand thinkers: no Hobbeses, Tocquevilles, Marxes or Webers." Anderson begins his work by bringing up three paradoxes of nationalism that he would address in the work:

1. Nationalism is a recent and modern creation despite nations being thought of by most people as old and timeless;
2. Nationalism is universal in that every individual belongs to a nation, yet each nation is supposedly completely distinct from every other nation;
3. Nationalism is an idea so influential that people will die for their nations, yet at the same time an idea difficult to define.

In Anderson's theory of nationalism, the phenomenon only came about as people began rejecting three key beliefs about their society:

1. That certain languages such as Latin were superior to others in respect to access to universal truths;
2. That divine right to rule was granted to the rulers of society, usually monarchs, and was a natural basis for organizing society;
3. That the origins of the world and the origins of humankind were the same.

Anderson argued that the prerequisites for the rejection of these beliefs began in Western Europe through the numerous factors that led to the Age of Enlightenment, such as the power of economics, the Scientific Revolution, and the advent of improvements in communication brought about by the invention of the printing press under a system of capitalism (or as Anderson calls it, print capitalism). Anderson's view of nationalism places the roots of the notion of "nation" at the end of the 18th century when a replacement system began, not in Europe, but in the Western Hemisphere, when countries such as Brazil, the United States, and the newly freed Spanish colonies became the first to develop a national consciousness.

In contrast to other thinkers such as Ernest Gellner, who considered the spread of nationalism in connection with industrialism in Western Europe, and Elie Kedourie, who construed nationalism as a European phenomenon carried around the world by colonization, Anderson sees the European nation state as a response to the rise of nationalism in the European diaspora beyond the oceans, especially in the Western Hemisphere, which was then retransmitted to Africa and Asia through colonization. Anderson considers nation state building as an imitative and transportable action, in which new political entities were copying the model of the nation state. As Anderson sees it, the large cluster of political entities that sprang up in North America and South America between 1778 and 1838, almost all of which self-consciously defined themselves as nations, were historically the first such states to emerge and therefore inevitably provided the first real model of what such states should look like. According to Anderson, this phenomenon led to the rise of nations: communities that were limited by their borders and were sovereign. Anderson conceived nationalism as having come about in different "waves."

=== Nationalism and print ===
Like other thinkers such as Marshall McLuhan in his The Gutenberg Galaxy, of particular importance to Anderson's theory on nationalism is his stress on the role of printed literature and its dissemination. Thinkers like McLuhan, Elizabeth Eisenstein, and Anderson did not believe that nationalism came about because of a vaguely defined "European" way of thinking, but because of the social, economic, and cultural practices associated with the rise of the printing press and the mass reproduction of printed material.

According to Anderson, "the revolutionary vernacularizing thrust of capitalism" was central to the creation of imagined communities, as the mass mechanical reproduction of printed works united people that would otherwise have found it difficult to imagine themselves as part of the same community, mainly because of extreme linguistic differences. With the advent of the printing press, languages became more stable and certain dialects became "languages of power" (such as the Queen's English in the United Kingdom) that were inherently more prestigious than sub-regional vernacular dialects. Print capitalism also meant a culture in which people were required to be socialized as part of a literate culture, in which the standardized language of their nation became both the language of printed material and education for the masses.

Fellow nationalism scholar Steven Kemper described the role of print technology in Anderson's theory as making it "possible for enormous numbers of people to know of one another indirectly, for the printing press [to] become the middleman to the imagination of the community." Kemper also stated that for Anderson the "very existence and regularity of newspapers caused readers, and thus citizens-in-the-making, to imagine themselves residing in a common time and place, united by a print language with a league of anonymous equals." Therefore, for Anderson, the rise of print technology was essential to create the "deep horizontal comradeship" that despite its socially constructed origins, was also genuine and deep-seated, explaining why nationalism can drive people to fight, die, and kill for their countries.

=== Multi-ethnic empires ===
Anderson also studied how the 19th century European dynasties that represented retention of power over huge polyglot domains, underwent "naturalization" at the same time as they developed programs of official nationalism in a process that he called the "willed merger of nation and dynastic empire". Anderson considered the empire as solely a pre-modern, "dynastic realm" and focused his attention on the official nationalism in multiethnic empires (e.g. the Russian Official Nationality), programs that he described as "reactionary, secondary modelling". Whereas previously the legitimacy of European dynasties had nothing to do with nationalness, Anderson argued that after the dissolution of the Austro-Hungarian, German, Ottoman, and Russian empires in the aftermath of World War I, the nation-state superseded the empire as the norm in international affairs, as demonstrated by how delegates from the imperial powers in the post-war League of Nations were careful to present themselves as national delegates instead of imperial ones.

== Selected works ==
In a statistical overview derived from writings by and about Benedict Anderson, OCLC/WorldCat encompasses roughly 100+ works in 400+ publications in 20+ languages and 7,500+ library holdings.

- Some Aspects of Indonesian Politics under the Japanese Occupation: 1944–1945 (1961)
- Mythology and the Tolerance of the Javanese (1965)
- Java in a Time of Revolution; Occupation and Resistance, 1944–1946 (1972)
- A Preliminary Analysis of the 1 October 1965, Coup in Indonesia. Interim Reports Series. Ithaca, New York: Cornell Modern Indonesia Project. 1971. ISBN 9780877630081. OCLC 210798. With Ruth T. McVey.
- Withdrawal Symptoms: Social and Cultural Aspects of the October 6 Coup (1976)
- Religion and Social Ethos in Indonesia (1977)
- Interpreting Indonesian Politics: Thirteen Contributions to the Debate (1982)
- Imagined Communities: Reflections on the Origin and Spread of Nationalism (1983; second edition, 1991 and later printings)
- In the Mirror: Literature and Politics in Siam in the American Era (1985)
- "Cacique Democracy and the Philippines: Origins and Dreams". New Left Review. I (169). New Left Review: 3–31. May 31, 1988. doi:10.64590/xqs. ISSN 0028-6060.
- Language and Power: Exploring Political Cultures in Indonesia (1990)
- The Spectre of Comparisons: Nationalism, Southeast Asia, and the World (1998)
- "Petrus Dadi Ratu" [Killer Becomes King]. New Left Review. II (3). New Left Review: 7–15. May–June 2000.
- Violence and the State in Suharto's Indonesia (2001)
- Western Nationalism and Eastern Nationalism: Is there a difference that matters? (2001)
- Debating World Literature (2004)
- "In the world-shadow of Bismarck and Nobel". New Left Review. II (28). New Left Review. July–August 2004.
- Under Three Flags: Anarchism and the Anti-Colonial Imagination (2005)
- Why Counting Counts: A Study of Forms of Consciousness and Problems of Language in Noli me Tangere and El Filibusterismo (2008)
- The Fate of Rural Hell: Asceticism and Desire in Buddhist Thailand (2012)
- A Life Beyond Boundaries: A Memoir (2016)

== Honors ==
- Association for Asian Studies (AAS), 1998 Award for Distinguished Contributions to Asian Studies.
- Guggenheim Fellowship, 1982 for work in political science.
- Fukuoka Prize, 2000 Academic Prize.
- Membership to the American Philosophical Society
- Social Science Research Council, 2011 Albert O. Hirschman Prize.
- Economic Research Institute for ASEAN and East Asia, Economic and Social Science Prize at the 1st Annual Asia Cosmopolitan Awards.
