= David Graeber bibliography =

Author bibliography

List of works by or about David Graeber, American anthropologist and social theorist.

== Books ==
- Toward an Anthropological Theory of Value: The False Coin of Our Own Dreams. New York: Palgrave. 2001. ISBN 978-0-312-24044-8.
- Fragments of an Anarchist Anthropology. Chicago: Prickly Paradigm Press (distributed by University of Chicago Press). 2004. ISBN 978-0-9728196-4-0.
- Lost People: Magic and the Legacy of Slavery in Madagascar. Bloomington: Indiana University Press. 2007. ISBN 978-0-253-34910-1.
- Possibilities: Essays on Hierarchy, Rebellion, and Desire. Oakland, California: AK Press. 2007. ISBN 978-1-904859-66-6.
- Direct Action: An Ethnography. Edinburgh; Oakland: AK Press. 2009. ISBN 978-1-904859-79-6.
- Debt: The First 5000 Years. Brooklyn, New York: Melville House. 2011. ISBN 978-1-933633-86-2.
- Revolutions in Reverse: Essays on Politics, Violence, Art, and Imagination. London; New York: Minor Compositions / Autonomedia. 2011. ISBN 978-1-57027-243-1.
- The Democracy Project: A History, a Crisis, a Movement. New York: Spiegel & Grau. 2013. ISBN 9780812993561.
- The Utopia of Rules: On Technology, Stupidity, and the Secret Joys of Bureaucracy. Melville House. 2015. ISBN 978-1-61219-375-5.
- On Kings. Hau Books. 2017. ISBN 978-0-9861325-0-6. Written with Marshall Sahlins.
- Bullshit Jobs. Penguin. 2018. ISBN 978-0241263884.
- The Dawn of Everything: A New History of Humanity. Farrar, Straus and Giroux. 2021. ISBN 978-0-374-15735-7. Written with David Wengrow.
- Pirate Enlightenment, or the real Libertalia. New York: Farrar, Straus and Giroux. 2023. ISBN 978-0-374-61020-3.

=== Posthumous books and unfinished books ===
- Anarchy—In a Manner of Speaking. Diaphanes. September 2020. ISBN 9783035802269. Conversations with Mehdi Belhaj Kacem, Nika Dubrovsky, and Assia Turquier-Zauberman.
- Uprisings: An Illustrated Guide to Popular Rebellion. PM Press. December 2020. ISBN 9781629638256. Written with Nika Dubrovsky.
- A David Graeber Reader. PM Press. Coedited by Romy Ruukel.
- Whose Creative Energy? Action and Reflection in the Construction of Value. Ibunsha (in Japanese) and Berghahn Books (in English). Coedited by Setsuko Nakayama.
- Graeber, David (November 7, 2024). The Ultimate Hidden Truth of the World. Allen Lane. ISBN 978-0-241-61155-5.
- Graeber, David; Dubrovsky, Nika (November 19, 2024). Cities Made Differently. Cambridge: MIT Press. ISBN 978-0-262-54933-2.

=== Edited books ===
- Shukaitis, Stevphen; Graeber, David; Biddle, Erika, eds. (2007). Constituent Imagination: Militant Investigations / Collective Theorization. Oakland, California: AK Press. ISBN 978-1-904859-35-2. OCLC 141193537.

== Academic articles ==
- "The new anarchists". New Left Review. II (13). January–February 2002.
- "Turning Modes of Production Inside Out: Or, Why Capitalism is a Transformation of Slavery" (PDF). Critique of Anthropology. 26 (1): 61–85. March 2006. doi:10.1177/0308275X06061484. S2CID 37810908.
- Graeber, David (September 2011). "The Divine Kingship of the Shilluk: On Violence, Utopia, and the Human Condition, or, Elements for an Archaeology of Sovereignty". HAU: The Journal of Ethnographic Theory. 1 (1): 1–62. doi:10.14318/hau1.1.002. S2CID 159850613.
- Graeber, David (December 2012). "Dead Zones of the Imagination: On Violence, Bureaucracy, and Interpretive Labor. The 2006 Malinowski Memorial Lecture". HAU: The Journal of Ethnographic Theory. 2 (2): 105–128. doi:10.14318/hau2.2.007. S2CID 145007192.
- There never was a West, Association of Social Anthropologists, 2006

== Journalism and popular articles ==
- "Rebel Without a God". In These Times. December 27, 1998.
- "Give it Away". In These Times. 24 (19). August 21, 2000.
- "The Twilight of Vanguardism". Indymedia DC. June 1, 2003. Archived from the original on January 12, 2013. (originally delivered as a keynote address during the "History Matters: Social Movements Past, Present, and Future" conference at the New School for Social Research on May 3, 2003)
- "Anarchism in the 21st Century". Z Magazine. January 6, 2004. Archived from the original on March 17, 2008. Co-authored with Andrej Grubacic
- "On the Phenomenology of Giant Puppets: Broken Windows, Imaginary Jars of Urine, and the Cosmological Role of the Police in American Culture" (PDF). December 6, 2005. (originally an address to Anthropology, Art and Activism Seminar Series at Brown University's Watson Institute, December 6, 2005)
- "Army of Altruists". Harper's. January 2007.
- "The Shock of Victory". Infoshop News. October 12, 2007. Archived from the original on February 14, 2012.
- "Revolution in Reverse". Infoshop News. October 16, 2007. Archived from the original on October 17, 2011.
- "The Sadness of Post-Workerism, or, "Art and Immaterial Labour" Conference: a Sort of Review" (PDF). The Commoner. April 1, 2008.
- "Hope in Common". Autonomedia.org. November 17, 2008. Archived from the original on February 10, 2009.
- "Debt: The First Five Thousand Years". Mute. 2 (12). February 10, 2009.
- "Against Kamikaze Capitalism: Oil, Climate Change and the French refinery blockades". Shift. November 2010. Archived from the original on April 20, 2012.
- "To Have Is to Owe". Triple Canopy (10). December 7, 2010.
- "The divine kingship of the Shilluk: On violence, utopia, and the human condition, or, elements for an archaeology of sovereignty". HAU. 1 (1). January 1, 2011. doi:10.14318/hau1.1.002. S2CID 159850613.
- "Occupy Wall Street Rediscovers the Radical Imagination". guardian.co.uk. September 25, 2011.
- "Occupy and anarchism's gift of democracy". The Guardian. November 15, 2011.
- "Note worthy: what is the meaning of money?". The Guardian. December 16, 2011.
- Graeber, David (March 2012). "Of Flying Cars and the Declining Rate of Profit". The Baffler. 19: 66–84. doi:10.1162/BFLR_a_00003.
- "Occupy's liberation from liberalism: the real meaning of May Day". The Guardian. May 7, 2012.
- "Can't Stop Believing". The Baffler. November 2012. doi:10.1162/BFLR_a_00090.
- "There's no need for all this economic sadomasochism". The Guardian. April 21, 2013.
- Graeber, David (April 2013). "A Practical Utopian's Guide to the Coming Collapse". The Baffler. 22: 23–35. doi:10.1162/BFLR_a_00129.
- Graeber, David (May 2013). "It is Value that Brings Universes into Being". HAU. 3 (2): 219–243. doi:10.14318/hau3.2.012. S2CID 144641915.
- "On the Phenomenon of Bullshit Jobs". Strike! Magazine. August 2013. Archived from the original on September 2, 2022.
- Graeber, David (August 2013). "Buncombe". The Baffler. 23: 7–9. doi:10.1162/BFLR_a_00160.
- "What's the Point If We Can't Have Fun?". The Baffler. January 2014.
- "The truth is out: money is just an IOU, and the banks are rolling in it". The Guardian. March 18, 2014.
- "Caring too much. That's the curse of the working classes". The Guardian. March 26, 2014.
- "Savage capitalism is back – and it will not tame itself". The Guardian. May 30, 2014.
- "Why is the world ignoring the revolutionary Kurds in Syria?". The Guardian. October 8, 2014.
- "Occupy Democracy is not considered newsworthy. It should be". The Guardian. October 27, 2014.
- "Students are right to march against the markets. Why can't education be free?". The Guardian. November 20, 2014.
- "Roy Bhaskar obituary". The Guardian. December 4, 2014.
- "Soak the Rich". The Baffler. July 2014. doi:10.1162/BFLR_a_00259. A conversation between David Graeber and Thomas Piketty.
- "Dickheads". The Baffler. March 2015.
- "The Bully's Pulpit". The Baffler. July 2015.
- "Debt and what the government doesn't want you to know (video)". The Guardian. October 28, 2015.
- "Britain is heading for another 2008 crash: here's why". The Guardian. October 28, 2015.
- "Turkey could cut off Islamic State's supply lines. So why doesn't it?". The Guardian. November 18, 2015.
- "Despair Fatigue". The Baffler. March 2016.
- "The elites hate Momentum and the Corbynites—and I'll tell you why". The Guardian. July 5, 2016.
- "Theresa May recites Labour's lines, but doesn't mean a word of them". The Guardian. May 10, 2017.
- "I didn't understand how widespread rape was. Then the penny dropped". The Guardian. November 5, 2017.
- "Why are world leaders backing this brutal attack against Kurdish Afrin?". The Guardian. February 23, 2018.
- "How to change the course of human history". eurozine.com. March 2, 2018. Co-authored with David Wengrow.
- "'I had to guard an empty room': the rise of the pointless job". The Guardian. May 4, 2018.
- "America's Kurdish allies risk being wiped out—by Nato". The Guardian. February 1, 2019.
- Graeber, David (December 5, 2019). "Against Economics". The New York Review of Books. LXVI (19): 52, 54, 56–58. : review of Skidelsky, Robert (November 13, 2018). Money and Government: The Past and Future of Economics. Yale University Press. p. 492. ISBN 978-0300240320. Opening of David Graeber's review (p. 52): "There is a growing feeling, among those who have the responsibility of managing large economies, that the discipline of economics is no longer fit for purpose. It is beginning to look like a science designed to solve problems that no longer exist."
