= When the Clock Broke =

2024 book by John Ganz

When the Clock Broke: Con Men, Conspiracists, and How America Cracked Up in the Early 1990s
- Author: John Ganz
- Language: English
- Publisher: Farrar, Straus and Giroux
- Publication date: 2024
- Publication place: United States
- Pages: 420
- ISBN: 978-0-37-460544-5
- Dewey Decimal: 320.52092273
- LC Class: E839.5 .G308 2024

When the Clock Broke: Con Men, Conspiracists, and How America Cracked Up in the Early 1990s is a book written by John Ganz originally published by Farrar, Straus and Giroux in 2024. It was reprinted by Picador in 2025 with a new postscript.

Prior to writing the book, Ganz wrote an article for The Baffler on right-wing populism in 1992.

== Reception ==
New York Review of Books London Review of Books The Daily Telegraph The Times n+1 The New York Times

== Awards ==
It was a finalist for the National Book Critics Circle Award in Criticism.
