= Fragments of an Anarchist Anthropology =

2004 pamphlet by David Graeber

- Author: David Graeber
- Language: English
- Publisher: Prickly Paradigm Press
- Publication date: 2004

Fragments of an Anarchist Anthropology is one of a series of pamphlets published by Prickly Paradigm Press in 2004. With the essay, anthropologist David Graeber attempts to outline areas of research that intellectuals might explore in creating a cohesive body of anarchist social theory.

Graeber posits that anthropology is "particularly well positioned" as an academic discipline that can look at the gamut of human societies and organizations, to study, analyze and catalog alternative social and economic structures around the world, and most importantly, present these alternatives to the world.

== Revolution through non-confrontation ==
One of the most striking suggestions in the pamphlet challenges the traditional anarchist notion of aggressive confrontation with the state. Graeber did postgraduate work with tribal cultures in Madagascar, including one with the Tsimihety in the northwest of the country. The Tsimihety, rejecting all governmental authority and organizing their society along very egalitarian lines, were able to continue their autonomy and culture for decades on end, up to the present, not by confronting the government, but by retreating. Graeber writes,

To this day they have maintained a reputation as masters of evasion: under the French, administrators would complain that they could send delegations to arrange for labor to build a road near a Tsimihety village, negotiate the terms with apparently cooperative elders, and return with the equipment a week later only to discover the village entirely abandoned—every single inhabitant had moved in with some relative in another part of the country. (p. 55)

== Aspects of an anarchist anthropology ==
In particular, Graeber suggests several areas a hypothetical anarchist anthropology would need to tackle, and in the book elaborates on each point briefly:

1. A theory of the state
2. A theory of political entities that are not states
3. Yet another theory of capitalism
4. Power/ignorance, or power/stupidity (Graeber explores a possible theory of the relation of power not with knowledge, but with ignorance and stupidity, in explicit opposition to Foucault's theories of power and knowledge. "Because violence, particularly structural violence, where all the power is on one side, creates ignorance." (p. 72))
5. An ecology of voluntary associations
6. A theory of political happiness
7. Hierarchy
8. Suffering and pleasure: on the privatization of desire
9. One or several theories of alienation

== Reasons for the nonexistence of anarchist anthropology ==
Graeber offers several possibilities why anthropologists are reluctant to come out and make normative judgments and proposals: "In many ways, anthropology seems a discipline terrified of its own potential. It is, for example, the only discipline in a position to make generalizations about humanity as a whole—since it is the only discipline that actually takes all of humanity into account, and is familiar with all the anomalous cases." (p. 96) Anthropologists, Graeber writes, may be also simply afraid of being dismissed as "utopian."

Part of the problem, Graeber claims, is that academics on the radical left have gravitated toward the more "High Theory"-oriented Marxism rather than the more practice-oriented anarchism. Graeber further claims: "1. Marxism has tended to be a theoretical or analytical discourse about revolutionary strategy. 2. Anarchism has tended to be an ethical discourse about revolutionary practice" (p. 6).

== See also ==
- Pierre Clastres
- Marcel Mauss
- Fieldwork Under Fire: Contemporary Studies of Violence and Survival
- Iraq at a Distance: What Anthropologists Can Teach Us about the War
