= Terence Turner (anthropologist) =

American anthropologist and activist (1935-2015)

- Born: 30 December 1935; Philadelphia, United States
- Died: 7 November 2015 (aged 79); Ithaca, New York, United States
- Board member of: Survival International
- Spouse: Jane Fajans
- Children: 2

Academic background
- Education: Harvard University (BA, PhD); University of California, Berkeley (MA)
- Thesis: Social Structure and Political Organization among the Northern Cayapo (1966)
- Doctoral advisor: David Maybury-Lewis

Academic work
- Discipline: Anthropology
- Institutions: National Museum of Brazil; Cornell University (1966–1968, 1999–2004); University of Chicago (1968–1999)
- Notable students: David Graeber

Terence Sheldon Turner (30 December 1935 – 7 November 2015) was an American anthropologist and activist for indigenous rights. He was professor emeritus of anthropology at the University of Chicago and president of Survival International USA.

== Biography ==
Turner was born in Philadelphia but grew up near Washington, D.C. due to his father's work for the United States Agency for International Development. He completed his BA degree in modern European history at Harvard College in 1957, followed by military service and an MA in the same subject from the University of California, Berkeley in 1959. He received a PhD in social anthropology from Harvard University in 1965, with a thesis on Social Structure and Political Organization among the Northern Cayapo, written under the supervision of David Maybury-Lewis and based on his fieldwork among the Gorotire group of the Kayapo in the Brazilian Amazon from 1962 to 1964.

He was a research associate at the National Museum of Brazil in Rio de Janeiro and a visiting assistant professor of anthropology at Cornell University from 1966. He joined the University of Chicago as an assistant professor of anthropology in 1968 and was promoted to professor in 1982. He became an emeritus professor at Chicago in 1999 and returned to Cornell as an adjunct professor. After his retirement from Cornell in 2004, he served as a visiting professor of anthropology there.

Turner did extensive ethnographic and activist work with the Kayapo from central Brazil. He also used an anthropological understanding to address broader regional and global development.

He became active as a spokesman defending the Kayapo's rights in the 1970s. According to his wife and fellow Harvard anthropologist Jane Fajans, this was prompted by a request from the government agency Fundação Nacional dos Povos Indígenas (FUNAI) to investigate incursions into Kayapo territory by poachers and gold miners. He led a BBC documentary crew to the Amazon in 1976, and supported Kayapo resistance against the Kararaô Dam project in the mid-1980s, taking part in the 1989 demonstration in Altamira, Pará. He served the Kayapo as interpreter and translator during their lobbying efforts in Brasília, Europe and the United States, taught them filmmaking and cultural politics, and acted as a consultant for documentaries by the BBC and Granada Television during the 1980s. In 1990, he founded the Kayapo Video Project. He served as US president of the indigenous rights advocacy group Survival International.

== Selected publications ==
- The Fire of the Jaguar, ed. Jane Fajans. Chicago: Hau Books, 2017.
- "The Social Skin". HAU: Journal of Ethnographic Theory, 2(2), 2012, pp. 486–504.
- "Anthropology and the Politics of Indigenous Peoples' Struggles". The Cambridge Journal of Anthropology, 5.1, 1979, pp. 1–43, JSTOR 23816304.
