= The Utopia of Rules =

Book by David Graeber

- Original cover
- Author: David Graeber
- Subject: Public administration
- Published: 2015 (Melville House)
- Pages: 261
- ISBN: 978-1-61219-374-8
- LC Class: JF1351

The Utopia of Rules: On Technology, Stupidity, and the Secret Joys of Bureaucracy is a 2015 book by anthropologist David Graeber about how people "relate to" and are influenced by bureaucracies. Graeber previously wrote Debt: The First 5000 Years and The Democracy Project, and was an organizer behind Occupy Wall Street. Graeber signed a book deal with Melville House toward the end of 2014, and The Utopia of Rules was released on February 24, 2015.

== Summary ==
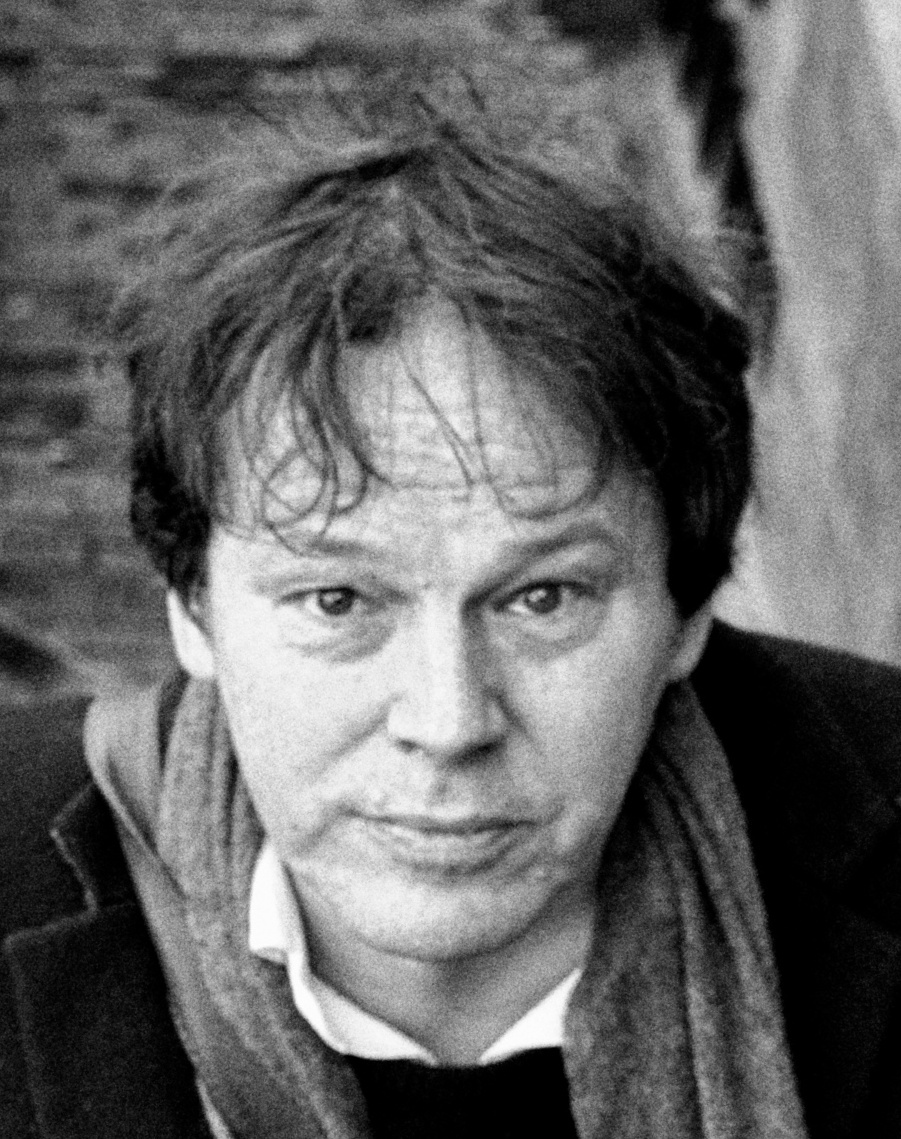
The author, in 2015

Graeber describes the contemporary era as the "age of total bureaucratisation," in which public and private bureaucracies, now so intertwined as to be effectively indistinguishable, have become the main mechanisms for Wall Street profits, and describes how bureaucratization brings the threat of violence (through legal and police enforcement) into almost every aspect of daily life in wealthy countries. Graeber argues that bureaucracies are no longer analyzed or satirized as they were in Catch-22 or The Castle. The book centers on the "political implications" of bureaucracies and Graeber's solutions.

Graeber notes that Americans largely dislike bureaucracies, but while they are not motivated to change bureaucracies, he thinks they should be. He makes an urgent call to remove the bureaucratic limits that hamper creativity. He argues that the "order and regularity" of bureaucracy is more harmful than valuable, and elaborates that rules do not apply equally in practice and are more "instruments through which the human imagination is smashed and shattered".

== Reception ==
Tomas Hachard wrote for NPR that the book is part academic and part radical politics. He noted the appearance of "Baudrillard and bell hooks" and other academic language. Hachard wrote that Graeber's non-bureaucratic Occupy politics also undergirds the book's arguments. Hachard wrote that Graeber's points are "almost always insightful, thought-provoking", and worthy of their "serpentine" reasoning around topics including the history of philosophy, linguistics, and science-fiction films. The reviewer felt that the book paired well with Nikil Saval's book on the "evolution of offices", Cubed, which followed the balance between office creativity and office rules.

== Legacy ==
The book's questions prompted the theme of the 2016 Taipei Biennial, in which artists produced work on how institutional bureaucracies structure human imagination.
