= Antonius Robben =

Dutch cultural anthropologist (b. 1953)

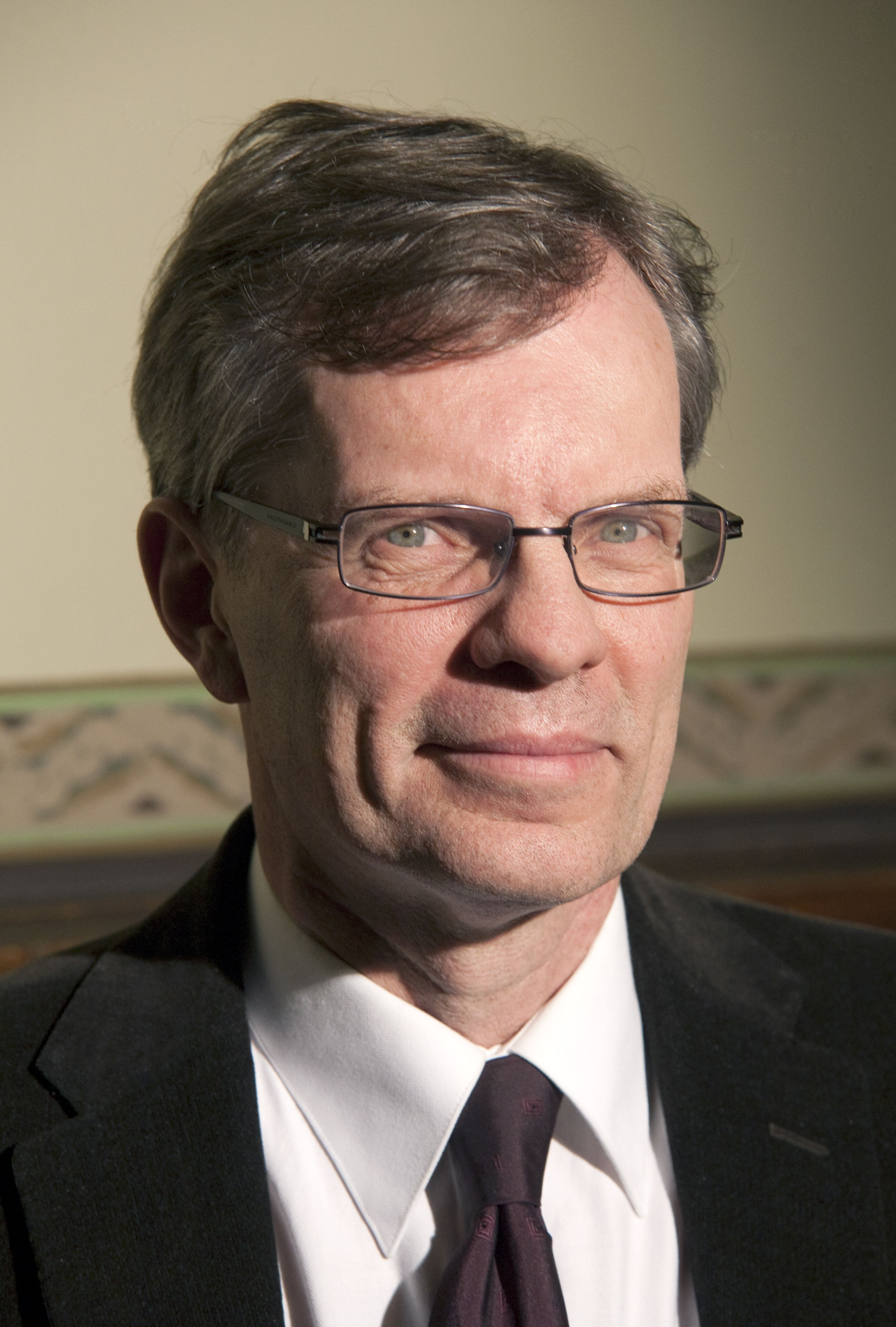
Antonius Robben

Antonius "Tony" Cornelis Gerardus Maria Robben (born December 17, 1953) is a Dutch cultural anthropologist and Professor Emeritus of Anthropology at Utrecht University, in the Netherlands.

== Career and fieldwork ==
Robben received an M.A. in Sociology in 1976 and graduated cum laude with an M.Phil. in Anthropology in 1979 from the University of Amsterdam. He conducted ethnographic fieldwork between 1977 and 1978 among raft (jangada) fishermen in the state of Alagoas, Brazil, under the supervision of Jeremy Boissevain and Bob Scholte. He received a Ph.D. in 1986 for his fieldwork from 1982 to 1983 on fishermen in Bahia, Brazil at the University of California, Berkeley. He was supervised by Burton Benedict and theoretically influenced by Gerald Berreman, Paul Rabinow, and Hubert Dreyfus. Robben later became a research fellow at the Michigan Society of Fellows. He was also an assistant professor at the University of Michigan, Ann Arbor from 1986 to 1989. Later, he took two years to do fieldwork from 1989 to 1991 in Buenos Aires, Argentina, to study the sociocultural trauma of enforced disappearances by the 1976-1983 military regime. Robben returned to the Netherlands in 1991 and was appointed Professor of Anthropology at Utrecht University in 1993. He received research grants from the Guggenheim Foundation, Lowie Foundation, National Science Foundation, Rockefeller Foundation, and the Netherlands Foundation for Scientific Research. He spent 2004 at Harvard University with a research fellowship from the David Rockefeller Center for Latin American Studies. In 2006, the American Anthropological Association awarded Robben the Robert B. Textor Prize for “his contributions to anticipatory anthropology, structural change and violence, and a widening understanding of the traumatic impact of growing violence globally.” Deeply affected by the Iraq War, he started the Iraq Research Project (2006–10) to add an anthropological understanding to a public debate dominated by historians, political scientists, and foreign affairs specialists. Currently, Robben is studying the wartime destruction and postwar reconstruction of the port city of Rotterdam in the Netherlands.

== Research interests ==
Robben's research has developed along five lines of interest: cultural economics; violence, trauma, and memory; death and mourning; space, place, and material culture; and the methodology of anthropological research.

Robben's study of cultural economics examines the relation of practice and discourse in the economy. Inspired by Bourdieu, Foucault, Heidegger and Ricoeur, the ethnography Sons of the Sea Goddess: Economic Practice and Discursive Conflict in Brazil (1989) argues that the economy is not a bounded social system that can be reduced to objective principles, laws, structures or models; instead, research on Brazilian boat and canoe fishermen demonstrated how their conflicting interpretations about what constituted the economy was intertwined with the social consequences of their different economic practices. Power differences and frequent disagreements about economic matters shaped their actions, decisions, and long-term strategies. This focus on discursive conflict and practice also guided the field research in Argentina on political violence and sociocultural trauma.

The study of the complex relations among violence, trauma, and memory constitutes Robben's second area of research. The book Political Violence and Trauma in Argentina (2005) demonstrated that the spiral of violence—generally understood as a self-perpetuating process—can become mediated by sociocultural trauma to result in a violence-trauma-violence process. Different manifestations of violence and trauma percolated through Argentine society and was fueled by the repeated mutual sociocultural traumatization of political enemies. This historical process culminated in the state terrorism of the country's last dictatorship (1976–83) against an armed insurgency and a radicalized political left. Protests against the massive enforced disappearances, together with labor unrest and the defeat in the Falkland/Malvinas War (1982), brought down the military regime.

Robben's next monograph, Argentina Betrayed: Memory, Mourning, and Accountability (2018), analyzed how primary bonds of trust motivated the relentless search for the disappeared by their relatives and how the military dictatorship was betraying the Argentine people through state repression. The dynamics of trust and betrayal did not end in 1983 when the regime fell from power, but continued in ongoing contestations and mutual mistrust among the state, and military and human rights groups during democratic times.

Robben's third area of research consists of the interdisciplinary study of violent death and complicated mourning. The edited book Cultures under Siege: Collective Violence and Trauma (co-edited with Marcelo Suárez-Orozco) developed a multilevel approach that analyzes how political violence targets simultaneously the body, the psyche, and the sociocultural order. This approach was elaborated in the monograph Argentina Betrayed by explaining how competing social groups and state institutions cope with massive deaths and disappearances through the oscillating processes of mourning and recovery. This ongoing pattern influenced the complicated mourning of the violent deaths and disappearances which were denounced by the human rights movement as an Argentine genocide. Robben concludes that the accusation of a nationwide complicity with genocide is a way of mourning the immensity of the crime of enforced disappearances and the betrayal of the trust of searching relatives and a traumatized Argentine society.

Robben's fourth area of research involves the study of spatial structures, social practices, and material culture. Sons of the Sea Goddess demonstrated how house design organizes domestic life through a process of structuration among cultural practices, spatial classifications, and social hierarchies. Political Violence and Trauma in Argentina and Argentina Betrayed revealed that the intrusion of the home by military assault teams violated spatial, social, gender and ego boundaries that undermined people's trust in each other and the state. In a current project about wartime Rotterdam, the Netherlands, Robben is examining the co-constitution of violent death and material culture.

Robben's final area of research concerns the investigation of anthropological research methods. He originated the concept of 'ethnographic seduction' to analyze the conscious and unconscious processes by which interviewees in conflict areas and postwar societies lead ethnographers astray from their research objectives. They seduce fieldworkers into accepting their discourse as the only correct interpretation of reality. Other problems of ethnographic fieldwork in conflict situations were addressed in the edited book Fieldwork under Fire: Contemporary Studies of Violence and Survival (co-edited with Carolyn Nordstrom). Robben added an additional methodological step with the edited volume Iraq at a Distance: What Anthropologists Can Teach Us About the War, which designed a comparative methodology for the anthropological study of war-torn regions inaccessible to ethnographic fieldworkers.

== Selected publications ==
=== Books ===
Year	Title
2023	Perpetrators: Encountering Humanity’s Dark Side (co-authored by Alexander Laban Hinton; 2023 Choice Award from the American Library Association). Stanford: Stanford University Press.
2018	Argentina Betrayed: Memory, Mourning, and Accountability. Philadelphia: University of Pennsylvania Press (Spanish edition: 2021 Argentina traicionada: Memoria, duelo, justicia. Barcelona: Editorial Anthropos).
2005	Political Violence and Trauma in Argentina. Philadelphia: University of Pennsylvania Press (2006 Textor Prize from the American Anthropological Association; Spanish edition: 2008 Pegar donde más duele: Violencia política y trauma social en Argentina. Barcelona: Editorial Anthropos).
1989	Sons of the Sea Goddess: Economic Practice and Discursive Conflict in Brazil. New York: Columbia University Press.

=== Edited books ===
Year	Title
2020	Cultures, Citizenship and Human Rights (co-edited with Rosemarie Buikema and Antoine Buyse). London: Routledge.
2018	A Companion to the Anthropology of Death. Hoboken: Wiley Blackwell.
2017	Death, Mourning, and Burial: A Cross-Cultural Reader. 2nd edition. Hoboken: Wiley Blackwell.
2015	Necropolitics: Mass Graves and Exhumations in the Age of Human Rights (co-edited with Francisco Ferrándiz). Philadelphia: University of Pennsylvania Press.
2012	Ethnographic Fieldwork: An Anthropological Reader. 2nd edition (co-edited with Jeffrey Sluka). Malden: Wiley Blackwell.
2010	Iraq at a Distance: What Anthropologists Can Teach Us About the War. Philadelphia: University of Pennsylvania Press.
2000	Cultures under Siege: Collective Violence and Trauma. (co-edited with Marcelo Suárez-Orozco). Cambridge: Cambridge University Press.
1995	Fieldwork under Fire: Contemporary Studies of Violence and Survival. (co-edited with Carolyn Nordstrom). Berkeley: University of California Press.
