= David Graeber =

American anthropologist and activist (1961–2020)

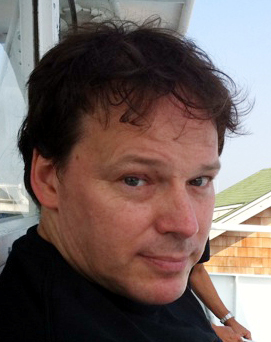
- Born: David Rolfe Graeber; February 12, 1961; New York City, U.S.
- Died: September 2, 2020 (aged 59); Venice, Italy
- Education: State University of New York at Purchase (BA, 1984); University of Chicago (MA, PhD, 1996)
- Known for: Debt: The First 5000 Years (2011); The Utopia of Rules (2015); Bullshit Jobs (2018); The Dawn of Everything (2021)
- Spouse: Nika Dubrovsky (m. 2019)
- Awards: Bread and Roses Award (2012); Bateson Book Prize (2012)
- Scientific career
- Fields: Economic anthropology; Social anthropology
- Workplaces: Yale University; Goldsmiths, University of London; London School of Economics
- Thesis: The Disastrous Ordeal of 1987: Memory and Violence in Rural Madagascar
- Doctoral advisor: Marshall Sahlins
- Other academic advisors: Terence Turner
- David Graeber introducing himself recorded June 2018
- Website: www.davidgraeber.org

David Rolfe Graeber (/ˈɡreɪbər/; February 12, 1961 – September 2, 2020) was an American anthropologist and anarchist social and political activist. His influential work in social and economic anthropology, particularly his books Debt: The First 5,000 Years (2011), The Utopia of Rules (2015), Bullshit Jobs (2018), and The Dawn of Everything (2021), and his leading role in the Occupy movement earned him recognition as one of the foremost anthropologists and left-wing thinkers of his time.

Born in New York City to a working-class family, Graeber studied at Purchase College and the University of Chicago, where he conducted ethnographic research in Madagascar under Marshall Sahlins and obtained his doctorate in 1996. He was an assistant professor at Yale University from 1998 to 2005, when the university controversially decided not to renew his contract. Unable to secure another position in the United States, Graeber entered "academic exile" in England, where he was a lecturer and reader at Goldsmiths' College from 2007 to 2013 and a professor at the London School of Economics from 2013.

In his early scholarship, Graeber specialized in theories of value (Toward an Anthropological Theory of Value, 2002), social hierarchy and political power (Fragments of an Anarchist Anthropology, 2004, Possibilities, 2007, On Kings, 2017), and the ethnography of Madagascar (Lost People, 2007). In the 2010s he turned to historical anthropology, producing his best-known book, Debt: The First 5000 Years (2011), an exploration of the historical relationship between debt and social institutions, as well as a series of essays on the origins of social inequality in prehistory. In parallel, he developed critiques of bureaucracy and managerialism in contemporary capitalism, published in The Utopia of Rules (2015) and Bullshit Jobs (2018). He coined the concept of bullshit jobs in a 2013 essay that explored the proliferation of "paid employment that is so completely pointless, unnecessary, or pernicious that even the employee cannot justify its existence".

Although exposed to radical left politics from an early age, Graeber first became directly involved in activism in the global justice movement of the 1990s. He attended protests against the 3rd Summit of the Americas in Quebec City in 2001 and the World Economic Forum in New York in 2002, and later wrote an ethnography of the movement, Direct Action (2009). In 2011, he became well known as one of the leading figures of Occupy Wall Street, credited with coining the slogan "We are the 99%". His later activism included interventions in support of the Rojava revolution in Syria, the British Labour Party under Jeremy Corbyn, and Extinction Rebellion.

== Early life and education ==
David Graeber was born into a working-class family. His parents were left-wing political activists.

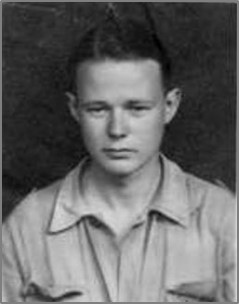
Kenneth Graeber, 1936

David's father, Kenneth (1914–1996), came from a family of German immigrants who settled in Kansas in the 19th century. He was educated at the University of Kansas, where he met members of the Young Communist League USA. As a result, in 1937 he volunteered for the International Brigades in the Spanish Civil War, where he served as a driver in a medical unit. After the war, he returned to the United States and completed his education. At the same time, he broke with the communists, but remained actively involved in the left-wing movement. During World War II, Kenneth served in the merchant marine. Later, he worked as a plate stripper on offset presses.

David's mother, Ruth Rubinstein (1917–2006), was from a family of Polish Jews who moved to the United States in the late 1920s. In the 1930s, she went to college, but due to the Great Depression she was forced to leave and start working in a factory. Ruth was a member of the International Ladies Garment Workers Union. There she took part in the union theater group. The comedy "Pins and Needles" staged with her participation became a hit on Broadway for several years. She did not continue her stage career, returning to the factory.

David's parents met after World War II during their stay at a Communist youth camp. Ruth's parents disowned her for marrying an ethnic German. The family settled in New York, where David and his brother, Eric, were born.

David Graeber grew up in Penn South, a union-sponsored housing cooperative in Chelsea, Manhattan, that Business Week called "suffused with radical politics". At age seven, he had his first experience of political activism when he attended peace marches in New York's Central Park and on Fire Island. He said he became an anarchist at age 16.

Graeber attended local public schools PS 11 and IS 70. His passion for deciphering Maya script helped him win a scholarship that allowed him to spend several years at Phillips Academy Andover. He then attended the State University of New York at Purchase, from which he graduated in 1984 with a BA in Anthropology.

Graeber received his master's degree and doctorate from the University of Chicago, where he won a Fulbright fellowship to conduct 20 months of ethnographic field research in the rural Betafo District in Madagascar, beginning in 1989. His resulting Ph.D. thesis on magic, slavery, and politics was supervised by Marshall Sahlins and titled The Disastrous Ordeal of 1987: Memory and Violence in Rural Madagascar. His other mentor at Chicago was Terence Turner.

== Academic career ==
Graeber taught at Haverford College in Pennsylvania for a year in 1997 and gave a course at New York University.

=== Yale University (1998–2005) ===
In 1998, two years after completing his PhD, Graeber became an assistant professor at Yale University, then an associate professor. In May 2005, the Yale anthropology department decided not to renew Graeber's contract, preventing consideration for academic tenure, which was scheduled for 2008. Pointing to Graeber's anthropological scholarship, his supporters (including fellow anthropologists, former students, and activists) said the decision was politically motivated. More than 4,500 people signed petitions supporting him, and anthropologists such as Sahlins, Laura Nader, Michael Taussig, and Maurice Bloch called on Yale to reverse its decision. Bloch, a writer on Madagascar who had been a professor of anthropology at the London School of Economics and the Collège de France, praised Graeber in a letter to the university.

Yale argued that Graeber's dismissal was in keeping with its policy of granting tenure to few junior faculty. Graeber suggested that Yale's decision might have been influenced by his support of a student of his who was targeted for expulsion because of her membership in GESO, Yale's graduate student union.

In December 2005, Graeber agreed to leave Yale after a one-year paid sabbatical. That spring he taught two final classes: "Introduction to Cultural Anthropology" (attended by more than 200 students) and a seminar, "Direct Action and Radical Social Theory".

=== "Academic exile" and London (2005–2020) ===
On May 25, 2006, Graeber was invited to give the Malinowski Memorial Lecture at the London School of Economics. Each year, the LSE anthropology department asks an anthropologist at a relatively early stage of their career to give the Malinowski Lecture, and invites only those considered to have made significant contributions to anthropological theory. Graeber's address was called "Beyond Power/Knowledge: an exploration of the relation of power, ignorance, and stupidity". It was later edited into an essay, "Dead zones of the imagination: On violence, bureaucracy, and interpretive labor". The same year, Graeber was asked to give the keynote address at the Association of Social Anthropologists 100th-anniversary Diamond Jubilee meetings. In 2011, he gave the anthropology department's annual Distinguished Lecture at Berkeley, and in 2012 he delivered the second annual Marilyn Strathern Lecture at Cambridge (the first was delivered by Strathern).

After his dismissal from Yale, Graeber was unable to secure another position at a US university. He applied for more than 20, but despite a strong track record and letters of recommendation from several prominent anthropologists, never made it past the first round. Meanwhile, several foreign universities offered him a job. In an article on his "academic exile" from the US, The Chronicle of Higher Education interviewed several anthropology professors who agreed that Graeber's political activism could have played a role in his unsuccessful search, calling the field "radical in the abstract" (in Laura Nader's words) but intolerant of direct political action. Another factor the article suggested was that Graeber had a reputation as personally difficult or "uncollegial", especially in light of Yale's allegations of poor conduct during the dispute over his dismissal. Graeber himself interpreted his exclusion from American academia as a direct result of his dismissal from Yale, likening it to "black-balling in a social club" and arguing that the charge of "uncollegiality" glossed a variety of other personal qualities, from his political activism to his working-class background, that marked him as a troublemaker. Reflecting on Graeber's case among other examples of "academic silencing" in anthropology, Nader speculated that the real reasons could have included Graeber's growing reputation as a public intellectual and his tendency to "write in English" rather than jargon.

From 2007 to 2013, Graeber was a lecturer and then a reader at Goldsmiths College of the University of London. In 2013, he accepted a professorship at the London School of Economics and Political Science and moved to London.

Graeber became a founding member of the Institute for Experimental Arts in Greece in 2008. He gave a lecture titled "How social and economic structure influences the Art World" at the International MultiMedia Poetry Festival, organized by the Institute for Experimental Arts and supported by the LSE anthropology department.

== Main works ==
Graeber is the author of Fragments of an Anarchist Anthropology and Toward an Anthropological Theory of Value: The False Coin of Our Own Dreams, the latter of which has been called "a sophisticated attempt to reconcile Marcel Mauss and Karl Marx". He conducted extensive anthropological work in Madagascar, writing his doctoral thesis, The Disastrous Ordeal of 1987: Memory and Violence in Rural Madagascar, on the continuing social division between the descendants of nobles and the descendants of former slaves. A book based on his dissertation, Lost People: Magic and the Legacy of Slavery in Madagascar, was published by Indiana University Press in September 2007. A book of collected essays, Possibilities: Essays on Hierarchy, Rebellion, and Desire, was published by AK Press in November 2007, and Direct Action: An Ethnography appeared from the same press in 2009. In May 2007, AK Press also printed Constituent Imagination: Militant Investigations/Collective Theorization, a collection of Graeber's essays co-edited by Stevphen Shukaitis and Erika Biddle.

In December 2017, Graeber and his former teacher Marshall Sahlins released On Kings, a collection of essays outlining a theory, inspired by A. M. Hocart, of the origins of human sovereignty in cosmological ritual. Graeber contributed essays on the Shilluk and Merina kingdoms and a final essay exploring what he called "the constitutive war between king and people". He was working on a historical work on the origins of social inequality with David Wengrow, published posthumously as The Dawn of Everything.

From January 2013 to June 2016, Graeber was a contributing editor at The Baffler magazine in Cambridge, Massachusetts, where he participated in the public debate about futures of technology. From 2011 to 2017 he was editor-at-large of the open access journal HAU: Journal of Ethnographic Theory, for which he and Giovanni da Col co-wrote the founding theoretical statement and manifesto of the school of "ethnographic theory".

In the political magazine Democracy, Charles Kenny wrote that Graeber sought out data that "fit the narrative on the evils of neoliberalism" and challenged or criticized data that suggested otherwise.

=== Debt: The First 5000 Years ===
Graeber's first major historical monograph was Debt: The First 5000 Years (2011). Invited in 2012 by Germany's leader of the opposition, Frank-Walter Steinmeier, to present the book in Berlin, Graeber publicly criticized Germany's demands to Greece over debt repayment and told Steinmeier to "wipe out [Greece's] debt now".

In the Canadian Anthropology Society's journal Anthropologica, Karl Schmid called Debt an "unusual book" that "may be the most read public anthropology book of the 21st century" and wrote, "it will be difficult for Graeber or anyone else to top this book for the attention it received due to excellent timing". Schmid compared Debt to Jared Diamond's Guns, Germs, and Steel and James C. Scott's The Art of Not Being Governed for its "vast scope and implication". He expressed minor frustrations with the book's length and with some of Graeber's claims and examples that are not fully developed.

The economic historian J. Bradford DeLong criticized Debt on his blog, saying it contained mistakes. Graeber responded that the errors did not affect his argument, writing that the "biggest actual mistake DeLong managed to detect in the 544 pages of Debt, despite years of flailing away, was (iirc) that I got the number of Presidential appointees on the Federal Open Market Committee board wrong". He dismissed DeLong's other criticisms as a divergence of interpretation, truncation of his arguments by DeLong, and errors in copy editing.

=== Bureaucracy, managerialism, and "bullshit jobs" ===
Much of Graeber's later scholarship focused on administrative bloat and what Graeber calls "managerial feudalism". One of the points he raised in his 2013 book The Democracy Project—on the Occupy movement—is the increase in what he calls bullshit jobs: forms of employment that even those doing the jobs feel should not or need not exist. He sees such jobs as typically "concentrated in professional, managerial, clerical, sales, and service workers". As he wrote in an article in STRIKE!: "Huge swathes of people, in Europe and North America in particular, spend their entire working lives performing tasks they secretly believe do not really need to be performed."

Because of the article's popularity, Graeber then wrote the book Bullshit Jobs: A Theory, published in 2018 by Simon & Schuster. In The New Yorker, Nathan Heller wrote that the book had "the virtue of being both clever and charismatic". In The New York Times, Alana Semuels wrote that though the book could be criticized for generalizations about economics, "Graeber's anthropological eye and skepticism about capitalism are useful in questioning some parts of the economy that the West has come to accept as normal." The Guardian gave Bullshit Jobs a mixed review, accusing Graeber of having a "slightly condescending attitude" and calling the book's arguments "laboured" but agreeing that aspects of the book's thesis are "clearly right". Bullshit Jobs spent four weeks in the top 20 of the Los Angeles Times bestseller list.

== Activism ==
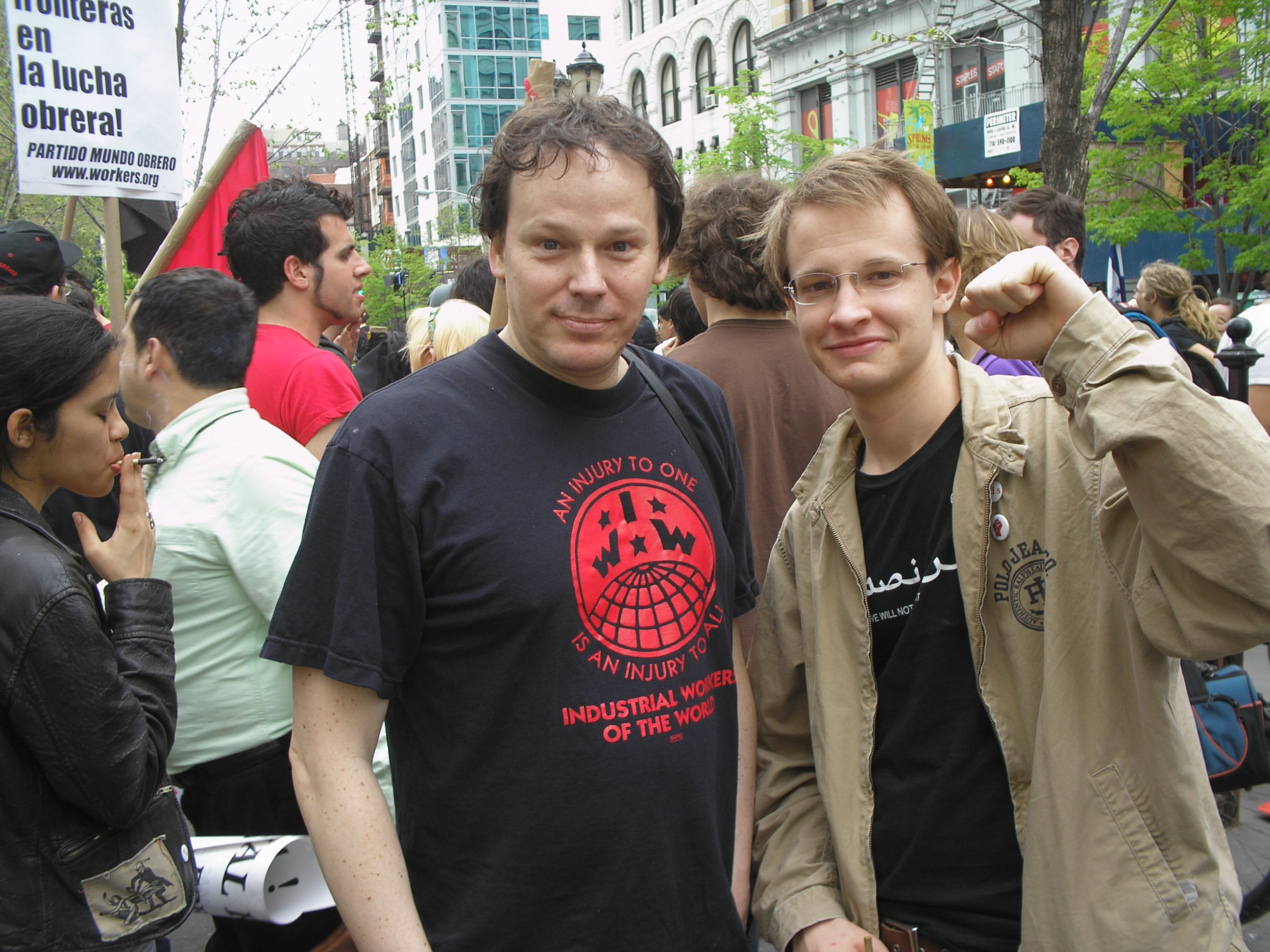
Graeber (left) at a rally for immigrant rights at Union Square, New York City in 2007

In addition to his academic work, Graeber was directly and indirectly involved in political activism from the turn of the 20th century. After covering the Seattle protests against the World Trade Organization Ministerial Conference in 1999 for the American magazine In These Times, he joined the meetings of the Direct Action Network in New York City. He then attended protests at the 2000 Republican National Convention in Philadelphia. He was a member of the labor union Industrial Workers of the World and an activist for Peoples' Global Action and the Planetary Alternatives Network. He protested at the World Economic Forum in New York City in 2002, supported the 2010 UK student protests, and played an early role in the Occupy Wall Street movement. He co-founded the Anti-Capitalist Convergence. From 2014 onward, he supported the political project of the Kurdish-led Democratic Autonomous Administration of North and East Syria and its military struggle against the Islamic State and Turkey.

On October 11, 2019, Graeber spoke at an Extinction Rebellion protest in Trafalgar Square about the relationship between "bullshit jobs" and environmental harm, suggesting that the environmental movement should recognize these jobs in combination with unnecessary construction or infrastructure projects and planned obsolescence as significant issues.

=== Occupy movement ===
In November 2011, Rolling Stone credited Graeber with giving the Occupy Wall Street movement its theme "We are the 99 percent". In The Democracy Project, Graeber called the slogan "a collective creation". Rolling Stone said he helped create the first New York City General Assembly, with only 60 participants, on August 2. He spent the next six weeks involved with the burgeoning movement, facilitating general assemblies, attending working group meetings, and organizing legal and medical training and classes on nonviolent resistance. A few days after the encampment at Zuccotti Park began, he left New York for Austin, Texas, and took part in Occupy Austin.

Graeber argued that the Occupy movement's lack of recognition of the legitimacy of either existing political institutions or the legal structure and its embrace of non-hierarchical consensus decision-making and prefigurative politics made it a fundamentally anarchist project. Comparing it to the Arab Spring, he said that Occupy Wall Street and other contemporary grassroots protests represented "the opening salvo in a wave of negotiations over the dissolution of the American Empire". In Al Jazeera, he wrote that the Occupy movement was from the beginning about "commitment to answer only to a moral order, not a legal one" and so held meetings without the requisite permits. Defending this early decision of the Occupy movement, he said, "as the public, we should not need permission to occupy public space".

In 2014, Graeber tweeted that he had been evicted from his family's home of over 50 years due to his involvement with Occupy Wall Street. He added that others associated with Occupy had received similar "administrative harassment".

=== Democratic confederalism in Syria ===
Graeber became a strong advocate of the democratic confederalism of the Autonomous Administration of North and East Syria at the time of the Siege of Kobanî in 2014, drawing parallels between its resistance to the Islamic State and the Spanish Revolution his father had fought for. He and Janet Biehl visited AANES's easternmost Jazira Canton as part of an international delegation in December 2014 and allegedly smuggled drones for the People's Defense Units (YPG) in the process.

Graeber befriended the Kurdish filmmaker Mehmet Aksoy and wrote a preface to the first volume of Abdullah Öcalan's 2015 book Manifesto for a Democratic Civilization.

Graeber harshly criticized the "bizarre, narcissist self-importance" of anarchist groups that refused to take the Kurdistan Workers' Party shift to democratic confederalism seriously, and he emphasized the organizational scale involved in PKK's transformation as compared to the founding of the Zapatista Army of National Liberation by former National Liberation Forces cadres in Mexico. After the November 2015 Paris attacks, he denounced the G20 leaders for failing to pressure Recep Tayyip Erdoğan's Turkey, which he said kept the Islamic State going with "tacit political, economic, and even military support". During the 2018 Turkish invasion of the YPG-held Afrin Region in Syria, he accused world governments of "cooperating" with Turkey's state "terrorism".

=== British politics ===
In November 2019, Graeber and other public figures signed a letter supporting Labour Party leader Jeremy Corbyn, calling him "a beacon of hope in the struggle against emergent far-right nationalism, xenophobia and racism in much of the democratic world". In December 2019, along with 42 other leading cultural figures, he signed a letter endorsing the Labour Party under Corbyn's leadership in the 2019 UK general election. The letter said, "Labour's election manifesto under Jeremy Corbyn's leadership offers a transformative plan that prioritises the needs of people and the planet over private profit and the vested interests of a few." Graeber, who was Jewish, also defended Corbyn from accusations of antisemitism, saying, "What actually threatens Jews, the people who actually want to kill us, are Nazis", and that the allegations were a weaponization of antisemitism for political purposes.

Graeber advocated for a boycott of The Guardian newspaper by fellow left-wing authors after saying that the paper had published distortions about Corbyn for years. He denounced The Guardian's alleged role in undermining Corbyn in the 2019 election, which, according to Graeber, resulted in a landslide victory for Boris Johnson and the Conservatives. He said The Guardian published progressive authors only to gain credibility with its readership and that its editorial policy was at odds with socialist politics. He was a vocal critic of Labour centrists who attacked Corbyn, saying they disdained socialist movements because they had sold out: "If those activists were not naive, if this man was not unelectable, the centrists' entire lives had been a lie. They hadn't really accepted reality at all. They really were just sellouts."

== Influence and reception ==
In the journal Sociology, Kate Burrell wrote that Graeber's work "promotes anarchist visions of social change, which are not quite believed possible by the Left, yet are lived out within social movements every day" and that his work "offers poetic insight into the daily realities of life as an activist, overtly promotes anarchism, and is a hopeful celebration of just what can be achieved by relatively small groups of committed individuals living their truth visibly."

Reviewing On Kings in the Journal of the Royal Anthropological Institute, Hans Steinmüller called Graeber and his co-author Marshall Sahlins "two of the most important anthropological thinkers of our time" and said their contribution was a "benchmark" for the anthropological theory of kingship.

After Graeber's death, Penguin Random House editor Tom Penn wrote: "David was a true radical, a pioneer in everything that he did. David's inspirational work has changed and shaped the way people understand the world... In his books, his constant, questing curiosity, his wry, sharp-eyed provoking of received nostrums shine through. So too, above all, does his unique ability to imagine a better world, borne out of his own deep and abiding humanity. We are deeply honoured to be his publisher, and we will all miss him: his kindness, his warmth, his wisdom, his friendship. His loss is incalculable, but his legacy is immense. His work and his spirit will live on."

== Personal life ==
Graeber had a long-term relationship with anthropologist Lauren Leve. After that, he had another long-term relationship with Erica Lagalisse. They were engaged from 2013 to 2017.

In 2019, Graeber married the Russian-born artist Nika Dubrovsky. The two collaborated on a series of books, workshops, and conversations called Anthropology for Kids and on the Museum of Care, a shared space for communication and social interactions nourishing values of solidarity, care, and reciprocity. According to Graeber's website, "The main goal of the Museum of Care is to produce and maintain social relationships." Graeber and Dubrovsky coined the term "museum of care" in their article "The Museum of Care: imagining the world after the pandemic", originally published in Arts of the Working Class in April 2020. In the article, Graeber and Dubrovsky imagine a post-pandemic future where vast surfaces of office spaces and conservative institutions have become "free city universities, social centers and hotels for those in need of shelter." "We could call them 'Museums of Care'—precisely because they are spaces that do not celebrate production of any sort but rather provide the space and means for the creation of social relationships and the imagining of entirely new forms of social relations." They also co-founded Yes Women, an art group supporting divorced women in former East Germany.

Graeber was not religious; he declared his faith in a just society and in eternal awareness of the impact of one's actions on others.

== Death ==
On September 2, 2020, Graeber died suddenly from internal bleeding caused by necrotic pancreatitis while on vacation with his wife and friends in Venice. As he died during the first year of the COVID-19 pandemic, his family organized an "Intergalactic Memorial Carnival" of live-streamed events in October 2020 instead of a funeral. His wife attributed the pancreatitis to COVID-19, pointing to his prior good health and to strange symptoms they both had for months beforehand. Scientists have since found a connection between COVID-19 and pancreatitis, as Dubrovsky believed.

== Selected publications ==
- Toward an Anthropological Theory of Value: The False Coin of Our Own Dreams. New York: Palgrave. 2001. ISBN 978-0-312-24044-8.
- Fragments of an Anarchist Anthropology. Chicago: Prickly Paradigm Press (distributed by University of Chicago Press). 2004. ISBN 978-0-9728196-4-0.
- Lost People: Magic and the Legacy of Slavery in Madagascar. Bloomington: Indiana University Press. 2007. ISBN 978-0-253-34910-1.
- There never was a West, Association of Social Anthropologists, 2006.
- Direct Action: An Ethnography. Edinburgh; Oakland: AK Press. 2009. ISBN 978-1-904859-79-6.
- Debt: The First 5000 Years. Brooklyn, NY: Melville House. 2011. ISBN 978-1-933633-86-2.
- The Democracy Project: A History, a Crisis, a Movement. New York: Spiegel & Grau. 2013. ISBN 9780812993561.
- The Utopia of Rules: On Technology, Stupidity, and the Secret Joys of Bureaucracy. Melville House. 2015. ISBN 978-1-61219-375-5.
- Bullshit Jobs: A Theory. Penguin. 2018. ISBN 978-0241263884.
- The Dawn of Everything: A New History of Humanity. Farrar, Straus and Giroux. 2021. ISBN 978-0-374-15735-7.
- Pirate Enlightenment, or the Real Libertalia. Farrar, Straus and Giroux. 2022. ISBN 978-0-374-61020-3.
- The Ultimate Hidden Truth of the World. Farrar, Straus and Giroux. 2024. ISBN 9780241611555.
