= Iraq at a Distance =

2009 book edited by Antonius C. G. M. Robben

- Editor: Antonius Robben
- Subject: Iraq War
- Genre: Anthropology
- Publisher: University of Pennsylvania Press
- Publication date: 2009

Iraq at a Distance: What Anthropologists Can Teach Us about the War is a book length collection of studies by six anthropologists, which provides insight into the impact of the Iraq War on Iraqi citizens since 2003. The book is edited by Antonius C. G. M. Robben and published by the University of Pennsylvania Press in 2009.

== See also ==
- Fieldwork Under Fire: Contemporary Studies of Violence and Survival
