= The Dawn of Everything =

2021 book by David Graeber and David Wengrow

The Dawn of Everything: A New History of Humanity
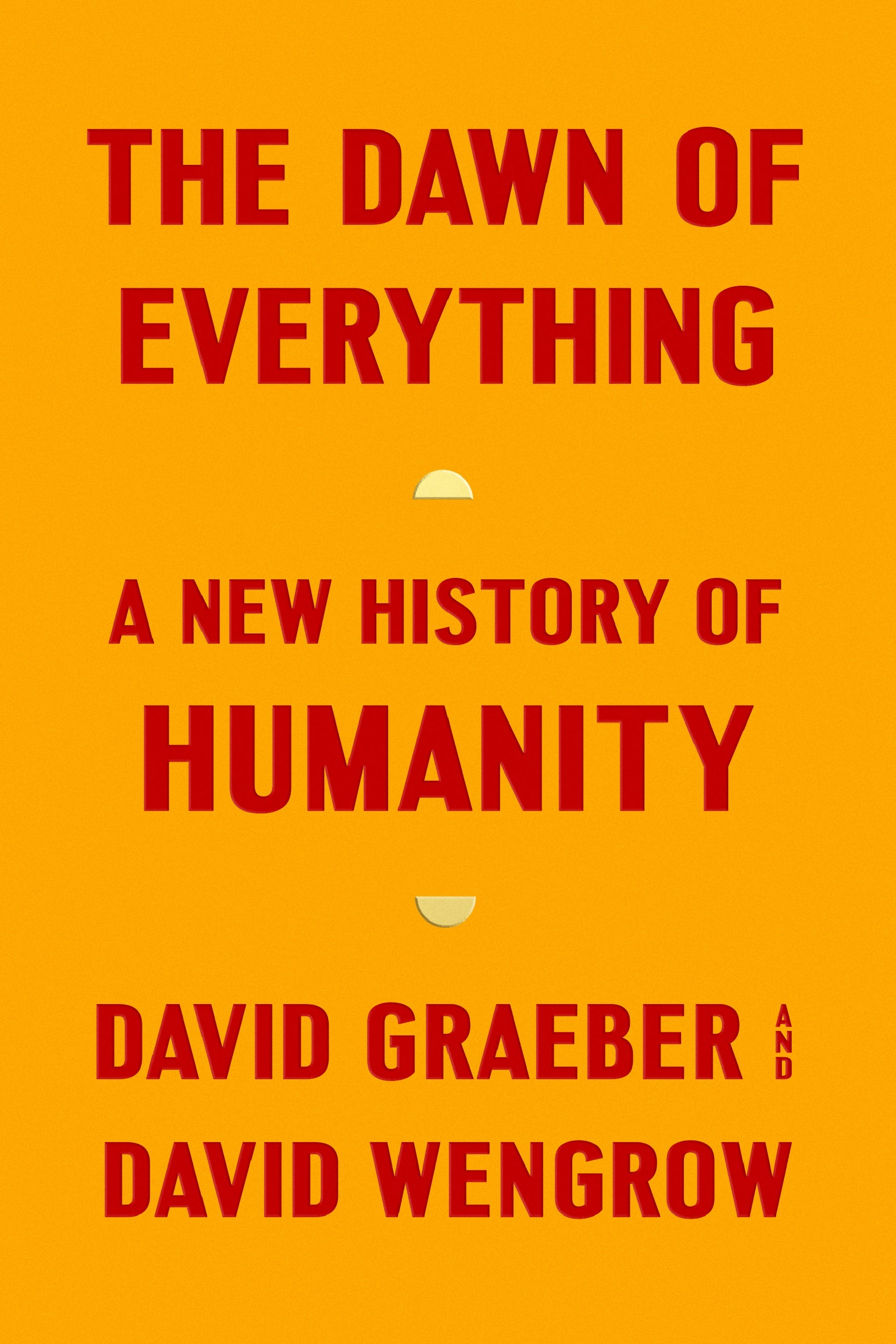
- Author: David Graeber & David Wengrow
- Subject: Human history
- Publisher: Allen Lane
- Publication date: October 19, 2021
- Pages: 704
- ISBN: 978-0-241-40242-9
- Website: dawnofeverything.industries

The Dawn of Everything: A New History of Humanity is a 2021 book by the anthropologist David Graeber and the archaeologist David Wengrow.

Describing the diversity of early human societies, the book critiques traditional narratives of history's linear development from primitivism to civilization. Instead, The Dawn of Everything posits that humans lived in large, complex, but decentralized polities for millennia. The book suggests that social emancipation can be found in a more accurate understanding of human history, based on recent scientific evidence with the assistance of the fields of anthropology and archaeology.

Graeber and Wengrow finished the book around August 2020. Its American edition is 704 pages long, including a 63-page bibliography. It was first published in the United Kingdom on 19 October 2021 by Allen Lane (an imprint of Penguin Books).

The Dawn of Everything received substantial attention in mainstream and academic publications, becoming an international bestseller, and was translated into more than thirty languages. It was a finalist for the Orwell Prize for Political Writing (2022), and was awarded the Wenjin Book Prize, given by the National Library of China and considered one of China's highest literary honours. In 2025, The Dawn of Everything was awarded the J.I. Staley Prize by the School for Advanced Research in recognition of ‘exceptional scholarship and writing that expand the boundaries of anthropological thought.’

== Summary ==
The authors open the book by suggesting that current popular views on the progress of western civilization, as presented by Francis Fukuyama, Jared Diamond, Yuval Noah Harari, Charles C. Mann, Steven Pinker, and Ian Morris, are not supported by anthropological or archaeological evidence, but owe more to philosophical dogmas inherited unthinkingly from the Age of Enlightenment. The authors refute the Hobbesian and Rousseauian view on the origin of the social contract, stating that there is no single original form of human society. Moreover, they argue that the transition from foraging to agriculture was not a civilization trap that laid the ground for social inequality, and that throughout history, large-scale societies have often developed in the absence of ruling elites and top-down systems of management.

=== Origins of inequality ===
Rejecting the "origins of inequality" as a framework for understanding human history, the authors consider where this question originated, and suggest it occurred during encounters between European settlers and the Indigenous populations of North America. They argue that the latter provided a powerful counter-model to European civilisation and a sustained critique of its hierarchy, patriarchy, punitive law, and profit-motivated behaviour, which entered European thinking in the 18th century through travellers' accounts and missionary relations. This was then imitated by the thinkers of the Enlightenment. They illustrate this process through the historical example of the Wendat leader Kondiaronk, and his depiction in the best-selling works of the Baron Lahontan, who had spent ten years in the colonies of New France.

The authors further argue that the standard narrative of social evolution, including the framing of history as modes of production and a progression from hunter-gatherer to farmer to commercial civilisation, originated partly as a way of silencing this Indigenous critique, and recasting human freedoms as naïve or primitive features of social development.

=== Archaeological and anthropological evidence ===
Subsequent chapters develop these initial claims with archaeological and anthropological evidence. The authors describe ancient and modern communities that self-consciously abandoned agricultural living, employed seasonal political regimes (switching back and forth between authoritarian and communal systems), and constructed urban infrastructure with egalitarian social programs.

The authors then present extensive evidence for the diversity and complexity of political life among non-agricultural societies on different continents, from Japan to the Americas, including cases of monumental architecture, slavery, and the self-conscious rejection of slavery through a process of cultural schismogenesis. They then examine archaeological evidence for processes that eventually led to the adoption and spread of agriculture, concluding that there was no Agricultural Revolution, but a process of slow change, taking thousands of years to unfold on each of the world's continents, and sometimes ending in demographic collapse (e.g. in prehistoric Europe). They conclude that ecological flexibility and sustained biodiversity were key to the successful establishment and spread of early agriculture.

The authors then go on to explore the issue of scale in human history, with archaeological case studies from early China, Mesoamerica, Europe (Ukraine), the Middle East, South Asia, and Africa (Egypt). They conclude that contrary to standard accounts, the concentration of people in urban settlements did not lead mechanistically to the loss of social freedoms or the rise of ruling elites. While acknowledging that in some cases, social stratification was a defining feature of urban life from the beginning, they also document cases of early cities that present little or no evidence of social hierarchies, lacking such elements as temples, palaces, central storage facilities, or written administration, as well as examples of cities like Teotihuacan, that began as hierarchical settlements, but reversed course to follow more egalitarian trajectories, providing high quality housing for the majority of citizens. They also discuss at some length the case of Tlaxcala as an example of Indigenous urban democracy in the Americas, before the arrival of Europeans, and the existence of democratic institutions such as municipal councils and popular assemblies in ancient Mesopotamia.

=== Sources of domination ===
Synthesizing these findings, the authors move to discovering underlying factors for the rigid, hierarchical, and highly bureaucratized political system of contemporary civilization. Rejecting the category of "the State" as a trans-historical reality, they instead define three basic sources of domination in human societies: control over violence (sovereignty), control over information (bureaucracy), and charismatic competition (politics). They explore the utility of this new approach by comparing examples of early centralised societies that elude definition as states, such as the Olmec and Chavín de Huántar, as well as the Inca, China in the Shang dynasty, the Maya Civilization, and Ancient Egypt. They argue that these civilisations were not direct precursors to our modern states, but operated on very different principles, arguing that modern states owe more to colonial violence than to social evolution. Returning to North America, the authors then bring the story of the Indigenous critique and Kondiaronk full circle, showing how the values of freedom and democracy encountered by Europeans among the Wendat and neighbouring peoples had historical roots in the rejection of an earlier system of hierarchy, with its focus at the urban center of Cahokia on the Mississippi.

Based on their accumulated discussions, the authors conclude by proposing a reframing of the central questions of human history. Instead of the origins of inequality, they suggest that our central dilemma is the question of how modern societies have lost the qualities of flexibility and political creativity that were once more common. They ask how societies have apparently "got stuck" on a single trajectory of development, and how violence and domination became normalised within this dominant system. Without offering definitive answers, the authors end the book by suggesting lines of further investigation. These focus on the loss of three basic forms of social freedom, which they argue were once common:

1. the freedom to escape one's surroundings and move away,
2. the freedom to disobey arbitrary authority, and
3. the freedom to reimagine and reconstruct one's society in a different form.

They emphasize the loss of women's autonomy, and the insertion of principles of violence into basic notions of social care at the level of domestic and family relations, as crucial factors in establishing more rigid political systems.

The book ends by suggesting that narratives of social development in which western civilization is self-appointed to be the highest point of achievement to date in a linear progression are largely myths, and that possibilities for social emancipation can be found in a more accurate understanding of human history, based on scientific evidence that has come to light only in the last few decades, with the assistance of the field of anthropology and archaeology.

== Reception ==
=== Critical reception and sales ===
The book was widely praised in various publications and received substantial attention in mainstream publications. Gideon Lewis-Kraus said in The New Yorker that the book "aspires to enlarge our political imagination by revitalizing the possibilities of the distant past". In The Atlantic, William Deresiewicz described the book as "brilliant" and "inspiring", stating that it "upends bedrock assumptions about 30,000 years of change." Andrew Anthony in The Observer said the authors persuasively replace "the idea of humanity being forced along through evolutionary stages with a picture of prehistoric communities making their own conscious decisions of how to live". Bryan Appleyard in his review for The Sunday Times called it "pacey and potentially revolutionary." The anthropologist Giulio Ongaro, stated in Jacobin that "Graeber and Wengrow do to human history what [Galileo and Darwin] did to astronomy and biology respectively". Reviewing for Science, Erle Ellis described The Dawn of Everything as "a great book that will stimulate discussions, change minds, and drive new lines of research".

The book entered The New York Times best-seller list at No. 2 for the week of November 28, 2021, while its German translation entered Der Spiegel Bestseller list at No.1. It was named a Sunday Times, Observer and BBC History Book of the Year. The book was shortlisted for the Orwell Prize for Political Writing. Historian David Edgerton, who chaired the judges panel, praised the book, saying it "genuinely is a new history of humanity" and a "celebration of human freedom and possibility, based on a reexamination of prehistory, opening up the past to make new futures possible."

=== Academic reception ===
The book was awarded the J.I. Staley Prize for exceptional scholarship by the School for Advanced Research. Morris W. Foster, President of SAR, stated that ‘The Staley Prize honors work that redefines how we understand humanity. The Dawn of Everything does exactly that.’

Numerous anthropologists and archaeologists praised the book's ambition and synthesis of recent archaeological evidence. The book was praised by professional anthropologists and archaeologists for challenging traditional narratives of history with depth and rigor. In Anthropology Today, social anthropologist Luiz Costa compared its scope and importance to classic works by Claude Lévi-Strauss. Writing for the New York Journal of Books, anthropologist James H. McDonald suggested that The Dawn of Everything "may well prove to be the most important book of the decade, for it explodes deeply held myths about the inevitability of our social lives dominated by the state". Anthropologist Matthew Porges, writing in The Los Angeles Review of Books suggested the book is "provocative, if not necessarily comprehensive", and that its "great value is that it provides a much better point of departure for future explorations of what was actually happening in the past".

Historians offered mixed assessments, criticizing and praising the book. Historian David Priestland argued that Peter Kropotkin had already and more powerfully addressed the sorts of questions that a persuasive case for modern-day anarchism should address, but lauded the authors' historical "myth-busting" and called it "an exhilarating read". Historian Walter Scheidel criticized the book for its lack of "materialist perspectives", but also called it "timely and stimulating". Historian David A. Bell, responding solely to Graeber and Wengrow's arguments about the Indigenous origins of Enlightenment thought and Jean-Jacques Rousseau, accused the authors of coming "perilously close to scholarly malpractice." Justin E. H. Smith suggested "Graeber and Wengrow are to be credited for helping to re-legitimise this necessary component of historical anthropology, which for better or worse is born out of the history of the missions and early modern global commerce."

Historian Brad Bolman and archaeologist Hannah Moots praised the book and drew comparisons with the work of V. Gordon Childe.

=== Methodology ===
Several scholars raised concerns about the book's methodology and use of evidence. In Anthropology Today, Arjun Appadurai accused the book of "swerving to avoid a host of counter-examples and counter-arguments" while also describing the book's "fable" as "compelling". David Wengrow responded in the same issue. Anthropology Today later published a letter from political ecologist Jens Friis Lund defending Graeber and Wengrow from Appadurai and praised the book's interdisciplinary engagement.

Gary M. Feinman accused Graeber and Wengrow of using "cherry-picked and selectively presented examples", while archaeologist Michael E. Smith criticized the book for "problems of evidence and argumentation". Anthropologist Richard Handler claimed that the book cherrypicked from several sources, but stated that it contained "stories we need and want to hear." Ian Morris echoed these sentiments, but maintained that the book was "a work of careful research and tremendous originality."

Philosopher Kwame Anthony Appiah argued that there is a "discordance between what the book says and what its sources say," while simultaneously praising the book for its archaeological and ethnographic minutiae. NYRB subsequently published an extended exchange between Appiah and Wengrow under the title "The Roots of Inequality" in which Wengrow expanded on the book's use of archaeological sources. Appiah concluded that Graeber and Wengrow's argument against historical determinism was ultimately "immensely valuable."

Anthropologist James Suzman noted that the book did not engage with more historical and academic literature on recent African small scale hunter-gatherers, but maintained praise.

Philosopher Helen De Cruz, wrote that the book offers "a valuable exercise in philosophical genealogy by digging up the origins of our political and social dysfunction," but also criticized the book for neglecting a range of other possible methodologies.

=== Additional perspectives ===
Several other reviews highlighted different aspects of the book's significance. Kevin Suemnicht in Black Perspectives argued that the book confirms the "Fanonian positions within the Black Radical Tradition that this world-system is inherently anti-Black."

Reviewers in the Ecologist praised the book but expressed the view that the authors "fail to engage with the enormous body of new scholarship on human evolution".

Anthropologist Durba Chattaraj wrote that reading the book from India "expands our worlds and allows us to step outside of a particular postcolonial predicament."

Writing for The Hindu, G. Sampath noted that two strands run through the book: "the consolidation of a corpus of archaeological evidence, and a history of ideas." Inspired by "the rediscovery of an unknown past," he asks, "can humanity imagine a future that's more worthy of itself?"
