= Malinowski Memorial Lecture =

Lecture series

The Malinowski Memorial Lecture is an annual lecture series hosted by the Department of Anthropology of the London School of Economics in commemoration of Professor Bronisław Malinowski, considered one of the most influential figures in the history of the discipline. It has been delivered annually since 1959 by young anthropologists deemed influential to the discipline. Notable speakers include Edmund Leach, Maurice Bloch, Peter Riviere, Tim Ingold and David Graeber.
