= The Ultimate Hidden Truth of the World =

2024 book by David Graeber

- Author: David Graeber
- Subject: Essays
- Published: 2024 (Farrar, Straus and Giroux)
- Pages: 384
- ISBN: 9780241611555

The Ultimate Hidden Truth of the World...: Essays is a collection of essays by David Graeber, published posthumously in 2024 by Farrar, Straus and Giroux.
