= Hau (anthropology) =

Hau is a notion made popular by the French anthropologist Marcel Mauss in his 1925 book The Gift. Surveying the practice of gifting, he came to the conclusion that it involved a belief in a force binding the receiver and giver. The term 'Hau', used by Māori, became a paradigmatic example for such a view. Writing at the turn of the century, Mauss relied on limited sources but his analysis has been expanded and refined.

== See also ==
- Gift economy
- HAU: Journal of Ethnographic Theory
