= Pirate Enlightenment =

2023 book by David Graeber

- Author: David Graeber
- Subject: Anthropology
- Publisher: Farrar Straus & Giroux
- Publication date: January 2023
- Pages: 208
- ISBN: 9780374610203

Pirate Enlightenment, or the Real Libertalia is a book by David Graeber, published posthumously in 2023.

== Description ==
In Pirate Enlightenment, or the Real Libertalia, author David Graeber argues that Ratsimilaho, a member of the Zana-Malata Malagasy ethnic group and descendent of a pirate, oversaw a period of democracy and peace as a precursor to the Age of Enlightenment. Graeber contests the common portrayal of Ratsimilaho as a figure who brought European-style “civilization” to Madagascar.

== Publication ==
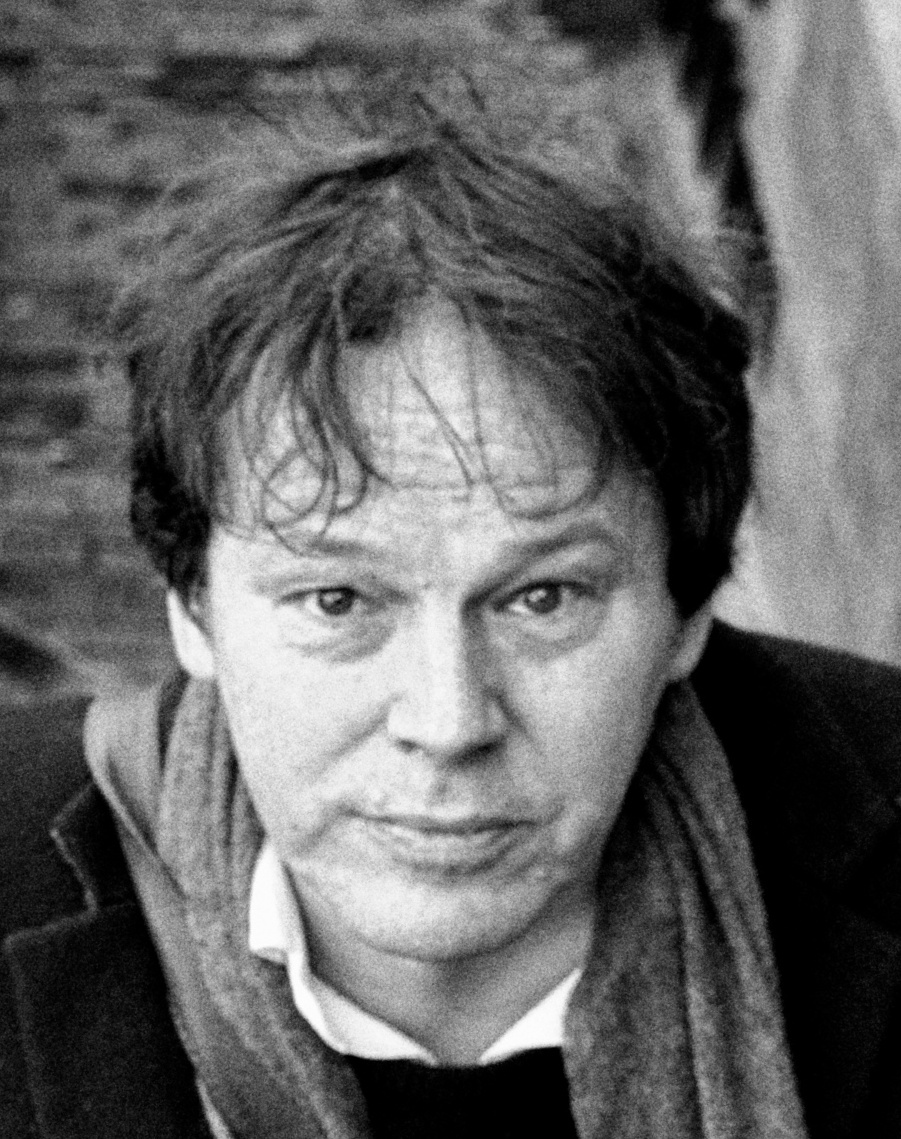
The author, pictured in 2015

The book began as an expansion of a chapter of Graeber's On Kings (2017). Revisiting his early 1990s anthropology dissertation work in Madagascar, Graeber focused on the Zana-Malata and Betsimisaraka ethnic groups. Graeber finished writing the book in 2013.

Allen Lane acquired the book's UK rights via Janklow & Nesbit in September 2022. Its first print run with Farrar Straus & Giroux was 200,000 copies in the United States.

== Reception ==
Pirate Enlightenment placed on LitHub and The Guardian's most anticipated books of 2023. Upon its release, it appeared on the Indie Bestseller list for hardcover nonfiction, based on reporting from independent bookstores in the United States.

== Bibliography ==
- Brotton, Jerry (February 8, 2023). "Pirate Enlightenment by David Graeber — sea battles and radical social experiments". Financial Times. Archived from the original on February 10, 2023.
- Carty, Pat (March 8, 2023). "Book review: How Madagascar pirates may have put traditional society to the sword". Business Post. Archived from the original on March 8, 2023.
- Dabhoiwala, Fara (January 27, 2023). "Pirate Enlightenment, or the Real Libertalia by David Graeber review – utopia by the sea". The Guardian. ISSN 0261-3077. Archived from the original on January 29, 2023.
- Dubrovsky, Nika; Chomsky, Noam (September 21, 2022). "Noam Chomsky on David Graeber's Pirate Enlightenment". ArtReview. Archived from the original on December 23, 2022.
- Frankopan, Peter (January 24, 2023). "How Enlightened Were the Pirates of Madagascar?". The New York Times. ISSN 0362-4331. Archived from the original on January 25, 2023.
- Jones, Dan (January 21, 2023). "Pirate Enlightenment by David Graeber: a band of very unlikely philosophers". The Times. ISSN 0140-0460. Archived from the original on January 8, 2023.
- Krishnan, Nikhil (January 19, 2023). "Were pirates pioneering socialists – or just filthy scallywags?". The Telegraph. ISSN 0307-1235. Archived from the original on February 3, 2023.
- Levin, Annie (January 30, 2023). "Review: David Graeber Argues that the Enlightenment Was Heavily Influenced by Pirates". The New York Observer. Archived from the original on January 31, 2023.
- Rediker, Marcus (March 18, 2023). "The Hidden Treasures of Pirate Democracy". The Nation. ISSN 0027-8378. Archived from the original on March 18, 2023.
- Smith, Justin EH (January 22, 2023). "The poetic history of David Graeber". New Statesman.
- Vandenburgh, Barbara (January 21, 2023). "David Graeber's 'Pirate Enlightenment,' Patricia Engel's 'Faraway World': 5 new must-read books". USA Today. Archived from the original on January 21, 2023.
