= Debt: The First 5,000 Years =

2011 book by David Graeber

- Author: David Graeber
- Language: English
- Publisher: Melville House
- Publication date: 2011
- Pages: 534
- ISBN: 978-1-933633-86-2
- OCLC: 426794447

Debt: The First 5,000 Years is a book by anthropologist David Graeber published in 2011. It explores the historical relationship of debt with social institutions such as barter, marriage, friendship, slavery, law, religion, war and government. It draws on the history and anthropology of a number of civilizations, large and small, from the first known records of debt from Sumer in 3500 BCE until the present. Reception of the book was mixed, with praise for Graeber's sweeping scope from earliest recorded history to the present; others criticized Debt for perceived inaccuracies or contradictions.

== Premises ==
A major argument of the book is that the imprecise, informal, community-building indebtedness of "human economies" is only replaced by mathematically precise, firmly enforced debts through the introduction of violence, usually state-sponsored violence in some form of military or police. A second major argument of the book is that, contrary to standard accounts of the history of money, debt is probably the oldest means of trade, with cash and barter transactions being later developments. The book argues that debt has typically retained its primacy, with cash and barter usually limited to situations of low trust involving strangers or those not considered credit-worthy. Graeber proposes that the second argument follows from the first; that, in his words, "markets are founded and usually maintained by systematic state violence", though he goes on to show how "in the absence of such violence, they... can even come to be seen as the very basis of freedom and autonomy".

== Synopsis ==
Graeber lays out the historical development of the idea of debt, starting from the first recorded debt systems in the Sumer civilization around 3500 BCE. In this early form of borrowing and lending, farmers would often become so mired in debt that their children would be forced into debt peonage. Because of the social tension that came with this enslavement of large parts of the population, kings periodically canceled all debts. In ancient Israel, the resulting amnesty came to be known as the Law of Jubilee.

Graeber argues that debt and credit historically appeared before money, which itself appeared before barter. This is the opposite of the narrative given in standard economics texts dating back to Adam Smith. To support this, he cites numerous historical, ethnographic and archaeological studies. He also claims that the standard economics texts cite no evidence for suggesting that barter came before money, credit and debt, and he has seen no credible reports suggesting such.

The primary theme of the book is that excessive popular indebtedness has sometimes led to unrest, insurrection, and revolt. He argues that credit systems originally developed as means of account long before the advent of coinage, which appeared around 600 BCE. Credit can still be seen operating in non-monetary economies. Barter, on the other hand, seems primarily to have been used for limited exchanges between different societies that had infrequent contact and often were in a context of ritualized warfare.

Graeber suggests that economic life originally related to social currencies. These were closely related to routine non-market interactions within a community. This created an "everyday communism" based on mutual expectations and responsibilities among individuals. This type of economy is contrasted with exchange based on formal equality and reciprocity (but not necessarily leading to market relations) and hierarchy. The hierarchies in turn tended to institutionalize inequalities in customs and castes.

The great Axial Age civilizations (800 BCE – 600 CE) began to use coins to quantify the economic values of portions of what Graeber calls "human economies". Graeber says these civilizations held a radically different conception of debt and social relations. These were based on the radical incalculability of human life and the constant creation and recreation of social bonds through gifts, marriages, and general sociability. The author postulates the growth of a "military–coinage–slave complex" around this time. These were enforced by mercenary armies that looted cities and cut human beings from their social context to work as slaves in Greece, Rome, and elsewhere. The extreme violence of this period, marked by the rise of great empires in the Mediterranean, China, and India, was, in this way, connected with the advent of large-scale slavery and the use of coins to pay soldiers. This was combined with obligations to pay taxes in currency; the obligation to pay taxes with money required people to engage in monetary transactions, often with very disadvantageous terms of trade. This typically increased debt and slavery. At this time, great religions also spread, and the general questions of philosophical inquiry emerged in world history. These included discussions of debt and its relation to ethics (e.g., Plato's Republic).

When the great empires in Rome and India collapsed, the resulting checkerboard of small kingdoms and republics saw a gradual decline in standing armies and cities. This included the creation of hierarchical caste systems, the retreat of gold and silver to the temples and the abolition of slavery. Although hard currency was no longer used in everyday life, its use as a unit of account and credit continued in medieval Europe. Graeber insists that people in the Middle Ages in Europe continued to use the concept of money, even though they no longer had the physical symbols. This contradicts the popular claims of economists that the Middle Ages saw the economy "revert to barter". During the Middle Ages more sophisticated financial instruments appeared. These included promissory notes and paper money (in China, where the empire managed to survive the collapse observed elsewhere), letters of credit, and cheques (in the Islamic world).

The emergence of the Atlantic slave trade and the massive amounts of gold and silver extracted from the Americas—most of which ended up in East Asia, especially China—stimulated the reemergence of the bullion economy and large-scale military violence. All of these developments, according to Graeber, directly intertwined with the earlier expansion of the Italian mercantile city-states as centers of finance that defied the Catholic Church's ban on usury and led to the current age of great capitalist empires. As the new continent opened new possibilities for gain, it also created a new area for adventurous militarism backed by debts that required the economic exploitation of the Amerindian and, later, West African populations. As it did, cities again flourished in the European continent and capitalism advanced to encompass larger areas of the globe when European trade companies and military outposts disrupted local markets and pushed for colonial monopolies.

The bullion economy ended with the abandonment of the gold standard by the U.S. government in 1971. This return to credit money increased uncertainties. For the moment, the dollar still stands as the primary world currency. This status of the dollar (as with all money) is based on its capacity to extend its quantity through debts and deficits and, more importantly, by the unrestrained authority of the Federal Reserve to create money, which has enabled the U.S. to create a $39 trillion national debt by 2026. This may continue as long as (a) the United States maintains its status as the world's pre-eminent military power and (b) client states are eager to pay seignorage for U.S. government bonds. By comparing the evolution of debt in our times to other historical eras and different societies, the author suggests that modern debt crises are not the inevitable product of history and must be resolved in the near future in a way similar to the solutions, at least in principle, as applied during the last 5000 years.

== Concept of "everyday communism" ==
In Debt: The First 5,000 Years, Graeber proposes a concept of "everyday communism" which he defines as situational behavior that conforms to the logic of 'from each according to their ability, to each according to their needs.' When analysing peasant lives, he writes: "The peasants' visions of communistic brotherhood did not come out of nowhere. They were rooted in real daily experience: of the maintenance of common fields and forests, of everyday cooperation and neighborly solidarity. It is out of such homely experience of everyday communism that grand mythic visions are always built". Also, "society was rooted above in the 'love and amity' of friends and kin, and it found expression in all those forms of everyday communism (helping neighbors with chores, providing milk or cheese for old widows) that were seen to flow from it".

Closer to home, he gives this example: "If someone fixing a broken water pipe says, 'Hand me the wrench,' his co-worker will not, generally speaking, say, 'And what do I get for it?' ... The reason is simple efficiency... : if you really care about getting something done, the most efficient way to go about it is obviously to allocate tasks by ability and give people whatever they need to do them." Moreover, we tend to ask and give without thinking for things like asking directions, or

small courtesies like asking for a light, or even for a cigarette. It seems more legitimate to ask a stranger for a cigarette than for an equivalent amount of cash, or even food; in fact, if one has been identified as a fellow smoker, it's rather difficult to refuse such a request. In such cases—a match, a piece of information, holding the elevator—one might say the "from each" element is so minimal that most of us comply without even thinking about it. Conversely, the same is true if another person's need—even a stranger's—is particularly spectacular or extreme: if he is drowning, for example. If a child has fallen onto the subway tracks, we assume that anyone who is capable of helping her up will do so.

The thing which makes it "everyday" is this argument: "communism is the foundation of all human sociability. It is what makes society possible. There is always an assumption that anyone who is not actually an enemy can be expected to act on the principle of "from each according to their abilities", at least to an extent, which is to say, the extent just described. He proposes studying these practices and says that the "sociology of everyday communism is a potentially enormous field, but one which, owing to our peculiar ideological blinders, we have been unable to write about because we have been largely unable to see it". Nevertheless, Graeber's ideas were later discussed by journalist Richard Swift as being a type of "a reciprocal economy"—which makes use of the "ethic of reciprocity" or the "Golden Rule".

== Publication ==
Graeber recounted the book's publisher, Melville House, contacting him in 2007, prior to the 2008 financial crisis, as an author who could have public appeal. The Brooklyn-based independent publisher was excited to hear about his work on the topic of debt, and Graeber was enticed at the prospect of writing for a broader audience than his activist and anthropologist peers, to influence a larger debate. Melville House initially planned for a short book on the economy, which grew into a comprehensive exploration of financial relations. Melville House felt that an anthropologist and his knowledge of human impact would fulfill a missing need in the public dialogues on global finance.

Graeber sought to apply anthropological research on human experience to contemporary issues—a practice, he has said, anthropologists abandoned. Graeber also wanted to expose "false views of money", such as debt as a zero-sum resource. For instance, as an alternative to the understanding that debt cancellation requires taxpayers to bail out other sectors, debt can instead be made unenforceable and thus cancelled without countermeasure, as in his recommended jubilee. The author intended the book's subtitle—"The First 5,000 Years"—as a provocation. He felt that the economic order at the time of publication was untenable and likely to change within one or two generations.

Keith Hart was Graeber's foremost influence in writing Debt. Hart, among the first anthropologists to discuss heterodox economics, distinguished between bullion and credit theories of money, and how money, paradoxically, is both. Atop this analysis, Graeber added historical examples of societies shifting between both uses.

Intellectually, Graeber also saw himself as reconciling the traditions of Karl Marx and Marcel Mauss. In the book's 2013 afterword he notes that he "wanted to write the sort of book Mauss might have written." The Marxist tradition, as he puts it, is about seeing how all things fit into a totality based on exploitation, but as a perspective, it risks making its adherents into cynics overcome by powerlessness. Alternatively, in Graeber's description of the Maussian tradition of cooperativism, all social possibilities are present—including democracy, dictatorship, oligarchy, individualism, and communism at once—and reinforce rather than contradict each other.

Debt was released in July 2011 and was a success for its publisher. By December, Debt was in its sixth printing, with growing demand. Its release coincided with "debt crisis" newspaper headlines for the United States Congress debt ceiling standoff and, two months later, Occupy Wall Street, in which the author was a major figure. Print sales outpaced ebook sales, and the former were especially popular in independent bookstores. When chain buyers hesitated at the author's obscurity and the book's intellectual and political content, Melville House opted for "underground" publicity through the Internet. Leading blogs, such as the economic blog Naked Capitalism, brought Debt enough visibility to catch the attention of mainstream outlets. The book was translated first to German, and subsequently into Spanish, French, Italian, Portuguese, Russian, Chinese, Dutch, and Slovenian.

== Reception ==
The book won the inaugural Bread and Roses Award for radical literature, and the 2012 Bateson Award of the American Society for Cultural Anthropology.

Journalist Robert Kuttner in the New York Review of Books called the book "an encyclopedic survey ... an authoritative account of the background to the recent crisis ... an exhaustive, engaging, and occasionally exasperating book." Journalist and activist Raj Patel of The Globe and Mail said, "This is a big book of big ideas: Within its 500 pages, you'll find a theory of capitalism, religion, the state, world history and money, with evidence reaching back more than 5,000 years, from the Inuit to the Aztecs, the Mughals to the Mongols." Journalist Gillian Tett of the Financial Times compared the book to the works of Marcel Mauss, Karl Polanyi, and Keith Hart.

Economist Julio Huato, associate professor of economics at St. Francis College, writing in Science & Society cited some of what he perceived as the book's contradictions, claiming that Graeber wrote in p. 21, that money and debt appeared simultaneously, and in p. 40, that money and debt did not appear simultaneously and that debt appeared first (although that tension is resolvable by the fact that Graeber use the term "money" in two separate senses in those two pages: as an abstract unit of account which, according to Graeber, arrived together with debt, and as physical currency such as coins, which arrived later). He also stated that, contrary to Graeber's claims, the "myth of barter"—i.e. the hypothesis that the accidental direct exchange of quasi-commodities predated money historically—is not an aabsurd hypothesis Huato concluded by asserting that several other of Graeber's claims in the book, such as the claim that violent dispossession is the "secret scandal" of modern capitalism, are problematic.

Jeffrey Rogers Hummel, a professor of economics at San Jose State University and an adjunct scholar at the American libertarian think-tank Cato Institute, found several "serious conceptual confusions" in the book. For example, Hummel said that Graeber likely confused the Austrian school economist Carl Menger with his son, the mathematician Karl Menger, which led to erroneous statements and accusations against the former, such as that he supposedly added "various mathematical equations" to economics and that he came up with the term "transaction costs". Hummel also contended that the book's tone is overly polemical and that it is "riddled with errors and distortions". Economist George Selgin, a professor emeritus of economics at the Terry College of Business at the University of Georgia and a fellow at the Cato Institute, echoed similar criticisms, adding that Graeber had not read Menger at all, and that his reading of Adam Smith was ungenerous. According to Selgin, the foundation upon which Graeber's evaluation of modern economics and commercial society rests is severely flawed.

J. Bradford DeLong, an economic historian, criticized Debt on his blog, alleging mistakes in the book. Graeber responded that these errors had no influence on his argument, remarking that the "biggest actual mistake DeLong managed to detect in the 544 pages of Debt, despite years of flailing away, was (iirc) that I got the number of Presidential appointees on the Federal Open Market Committee board wrong". He dismissed his other criticisms as representing a divergence of interpretation, truncation of his arguments by DeLong, and mistakes in the copy editing of the book.

The book was reviewed by way of a debate in the socialist magazine Jacobin. In the first review, economist Mike Beggs, a lecturer in political economy at the University of Sydney, wrote that while "there is a lot of fantastic material in there", he "found the main arguments wholly unconvincing ... Graeber is a wonderful storyteller. But the accumulation of anecdotes does not add up to an explanation, and certainly not one that would overturn the existing wisdom on the subject, conventional or otherwise". In response, economist J. W. Mason, an associate professor of economics at John Jay College, defended the book. He noted that the book's "key themes are in close harmony with the main themes of heterodox economics work going back to Keynes [economics]", and that while it is "no substitute for Marx, Keynes and Schumpeter, for Minsky and Leijonhufvud, for Henwood and Mehrling ... it is a fine complement."

== Bibliography ==
- Appel, Hannah Chadeayne (2014). "Finance Is Just Another Word for Other People's Debts" (PDF). Radical History Review. 2014 (118): 159–173. doi:10.1215/01636545-2350939. ISSN 0163-6545 – via EBSCOhost.
- Deahl, Rachel (October 3, 2011). "Melville House Staffs Up, Overhauls Web Site". Publishers Weekly.
- Habash, Gabe (December 2, 2011). "Melville House Finds Hit for the 99%". Publishers Weekly. 258 (49): 9–10. ISSN 0000-0019 – via EBSCOhost.
