= Commercial state =

The commercial state concept (and its important variant, commercial society) is sometimes associated with Adam Ferguson's concept of civil society and refers to a government or political state devoted primarily to the promotion and advancement of commercial interests. Ferguson, Adam Smith and other representatives of the Scottish Enlightenment (and who referred to themselves as the literati) were more likely to use the term commercial society. The underlying idea of the commercial state can also be linked to the American School of Economics (and in particular to the legacy of the political and economic approach of Alexander Hamilton). In its modern manifestation, national, state and local governments which pursue business and commercial development and other forms of economic and industrial development through tax policies and forms of positive incentives and inducements may properly be termed commercial states. Practical commercial state activities include governmental economic development efforts including encouraging plant relocations, tax rebates, zoning easements and assorted other incentives and concessions.

Several lines of thought and action (e.g. Mercantilism) run from ancient Greek and Roman philosophy through Ferguson and Adam Smith. They can be traced through the Federalist party of Alexander Hamilton and more recently Austrian economists such as Ludwig von Mises, Frederick Hayek. An essentially commercial view of the state has continued down to modern theorists including Milton Friedman and Murray Rothbard, who argue not only for a limited role for government, but also that that residual role is heavily commercial. The modern U.S. Republican Party and Democratic Party in the U.S. both include significant factions of commercial state adherents, although commercial state rhetoric is usually much more evident in the former. (See, for example, discussions of Reaganomics in Ronald Reagan and the U.S. Republican Party.)

== The Hibernia Affair ==
The underlying issue of the commercial state was an important one for nineteenth century German government officials who saw themselves as holding the line against encroaching industrialism. This is illustrated, for example, in the Hibernia Affair in which the Prussian nobility and bureaucracy sought to curtail the growing power of the industrial middle class. According to Charles Medalen, "The Hibernia Affair of 1904 was nominally a struggle between Prussian 'state socialism' and private enterprise. Neither position was clearly defined.... Nonetheless Prussia's attempt to nationalize the Hibernia Coal Company revived fundamental issues which had once divided the bourgeoise and the traditional rulers of Prussia, issues which many had thought resolved by social empiricalism and Weltpolitic." In blocking the takeover of Hibernia, heavy industry sought to reestablish limits to the government's growing encroachment upon the private sphere.

In this context, the commercial state as it was seen to exist in Britain and the U.S. was contrasted with the majesty of the traditional Prussian state (and the Holy Roman Empire):

The Prussian state was not an autonomous factor in society, as proclaimed by its official myth. But neither was it the simple tool of the bourgeoise as some Marxists would have it. With a heavy ballast of history, a vague and pervasive ideology, and a bureaucracy jealous of its power, the state had a massive momentum of its own. The Hibernia affair was a symbolic struggle over the political destinies of Prussia and Germany. Would 'the state' control the economy, or would the economy overwhelm the state? Did the government, allied to the capitalist bourgeoise and willy-nilly committed to industrial society have the power to alter the direction of German economic development? Or would a belated bourgeois revolution occur, would the traditional 'state' prove powerless to stop capitalist monopolies from imposing their will on society? Would the government become an auxiliary service to business, as it seemed to be in Britain and America? The fate of Hibernia itself was of secondary importance, but it was a harbinger of the future, and the protagonists fought with a bitterness born of that knowledge.

== Policy-oriented and job oriented states ==
At least since Hamilton's time, business and commercial interests have played important roles in U.S. government at all levels. Numerous concepts in political science, such as John Fenton's (1966) distinction between policy-oriented states ( Minnesota, Wisconsin and North Dakota) and job-oriented states (Michigan, Illinois, Indiana and Ohio) reflect differences in the role of contemporary commercial interests in U.S. state governments (although one could argue that the differences Fenton saw may have been considerably mitigated – generally in the direction of the commercial state – in these midwestern states over the past 40 years.)

== See also ==
- Capitalist state
- Corporatocracy
- Economic liberalism
