= Fieldwork Under Fire =

Collection of recorded experiences

Fieldwork Under Fire: Contemporary Studies of Violence and Survival is a book length collection of recorded experiences; each of which was contributed by an anthropologist who had to strategize and innovate, while directly living through the emotion, stress, and abnormal ordeal of political violence in the field, to gather ethnographic data and descriptions for their individual studies. The "Introduction" is written by the editors, Carolyn Nordstrom and Antonius C. G. M. Robben. This book was first published by the University of California Press in 1997.

== Overview ==
Each author has recorded the subjective experiences of various persons in violent environments and surroundings. These are the perspectives of the offenders, victims, noncombatants, soldiers, insurgents, black marketers, heroes, scavengers and researchers. Articles also show how anthropologists are often compelled to create innovative data gathering strategies when working in the midst of dangerous environments.

== See also ==
- Iraq at a Distance: What Anthropologists Can Teach Us about the War
