= Lost People =

2007 book by David Graeber

- Author: David Graeber
- Subjects: Anthropology, Madagascar
- Publisher: Indiana University Press
- Publication date: 2007
- Pages: 488
- ISBN: 978-0-253-21915-2

Lost People: Magic and the Legacy of Slavery in Madagascar is a 2007 book-length ethnographic study of Betafo, Madagascar written by anthropologist David Graeber and published by the Indiana University Press.
