= Toward an Anthropological Theory of Value =

2002 book by David Graeber

- Author: David Graeber
- Subject: Sociological theory
- Published: 2002 (Palgrave)
- Pages: 337
- ISBN: 978-0-312-24045-5

Toward an Anthropological Theory of Value: The False Coin of Our Own Dreams is a 2002 book-length synthesis of cultural, economic, and political theories of value, written by anthropologist David Graeber and published by Palgrave.

The book has also been translated into other languages including Spanish, French, German and Turkish.
