= Gerald Berreman =

American anthropologist and ethnographer

Gerald Duane Berreman (1930-2013) was an American anthropologist and ethnographer who was known for his theory on the caste system in India, as well as his contributions to the ethical practice of anthropology itself. Berreman spoke out during the Vietnam War era about the working relationship between anthropologists and the CIA. His anthropological work focused on the study of social stratification, in which he drew parallels between racial inequality in the United States and the caste system in India.

In India he saw power and economic factors playing an important role in caste system. Citing the example of foothills of Himalaya, where people never considered themselves impure in terms of mannerism, food habits, etc, he said caste is a product of domination and sub-domination.

== Works ==
- Gerald Berreman (1960) "Caste in India and the United States" in American Journal of Sociology 66:120-127.
- Gerald Berreman (1962) "Behind Many Masks: Ethnography and Impression Management in a Himalayan Village." Ithaca, NY: Society for Applied Anthropology.
- Gerald Berreman (1972) "Social Categories and Social Interactionism in Urban India" in American Anthropologist 74(3):567-586.
- Gerald Berreman (1980) "Social Inequality: A Cross-Cultural Analysis" in Social Inequality: Comparative and Developmental Approaches, pp. 3–40. Ed. Gerald Berreman. New York: Academic Press.
