= Possibilities: Essays on Hierarchy, Rebellion, and Desire =

- Author: David Graeber
- Publisher: AK Press
- Publication date: 2007
- Pages: 433
- ISBN: 978-1904859-66-6

Possibilities: Essays on Hierarchy, Rebellion, and Desire is a 2007 collection of twelve essays by American anthropologist David Graeber. The book was published by AK Press.
