= Anthropology Today =

- Discipline: Anthropology
- Language: English
- Edited by: Gustaaf Houtman

Publication details
- History: 1985-present
- Publisher: Wiley-Blackwell on behalf of the Royal Anthropological Institute.
- Frequency: Bimonthly

Standard abbreviations
- ISO 4: Anthropol. Today

Indexing
- ISSN: 0268-540X (print); 1467-8322 (web)
- JSTOR: 0268540X

Links
- Journal homepage; Online access; Online archive

Anthropology Today is a bimonthly peer-reviewed academic journal published by John Wiley & Sons on behalf of the Royal Anthropological Institute. The journal was established in 1985 and publishes papers that apply anthropological analyses to areas such as education, medicine, and development and link anthropology to other academic disciplines.
