= Direct Action: An Ethnography =

2009 book by David Graeber

- Author: David Graeber
- Subject: Ethnography, global justice movement, anarchism
- Published: October 8, 2009 (AK Press)
- Pages: 600
- ISBN: 9781904859796

Direct Action: An Ethnography is an ethnographic study of the global justice movement written by anthropologist David Graeber and published by AK Press in 2009.
