= David Wengrow =

British archaeologist

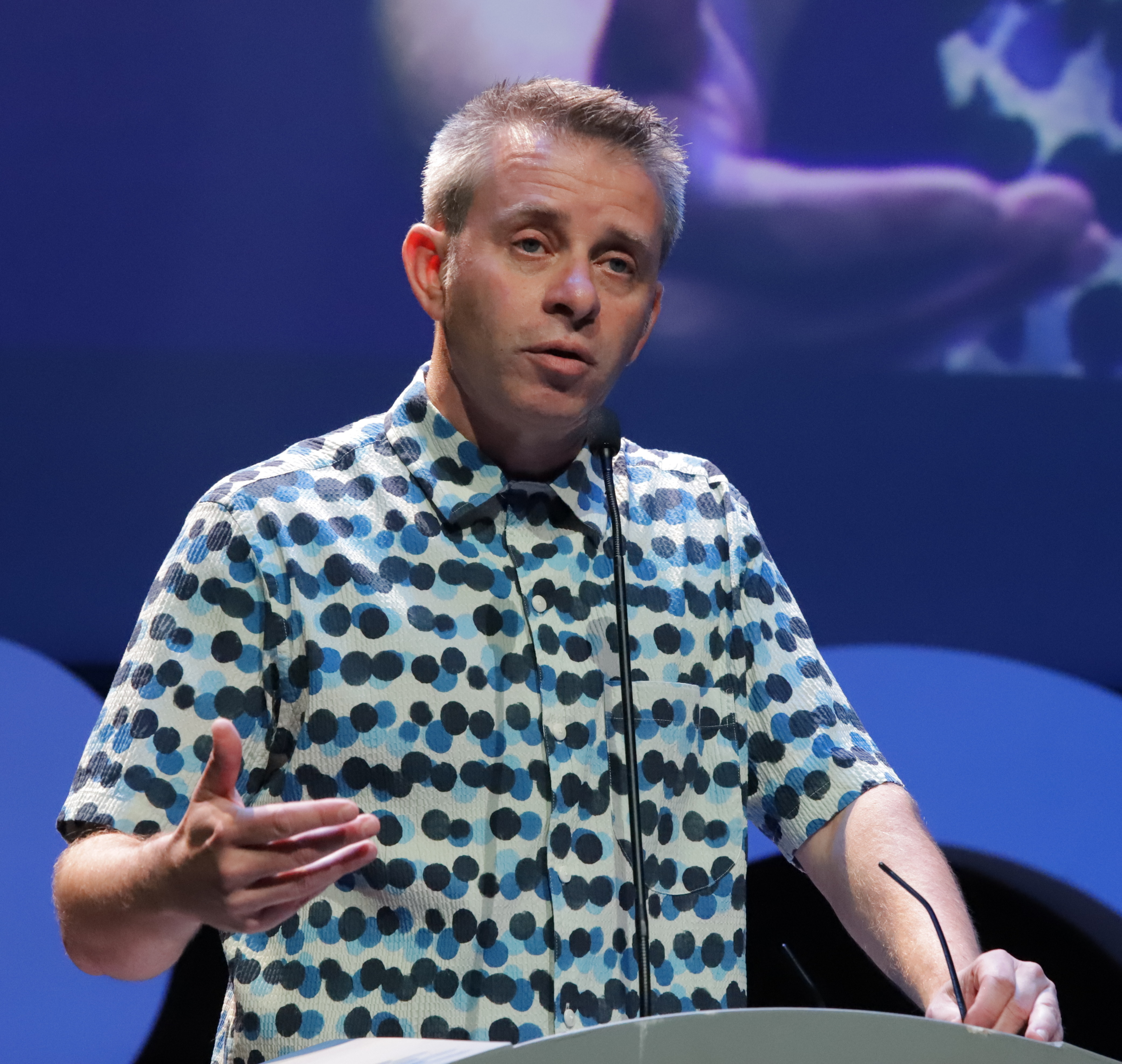
- Wengrow in 2023
- Born: 25 July 1972 (age 54)
- Education: University of Oxford (BA, MSt, DPhil)
- Occupations: Archaeologist; Author; Academic
- Writing career
- Subject: Archaeology

David Wengrow FSA (born 25 July 1972) is a British archaeologist and Professor of Comparative Archaeology at the Institute of Archaeology, University College London. He co-authored the New York Times bestseller The Dawn of Everything: A New History of Humanity, which won the J.I. Staley Prize for outstanding scholarship in anthropology, and the 20th Wenjin Book Prize, one of China's highest literary honours. The book was also a finalist for the Orwell Prize in 2022. Wengrow has contributed essays on topics such as social inequality and climate change to The Guardian and The New York Times. In 2021 he was ranked No. 10 in ArtReview's Power 100 list of the most influential people in art.

== Education ==
Wengrow enrolled at the University of Oxford in 1993, obtaining a BA in archaeology and anthropology. He went on to qualify for an MSt in world archaeology in 1998 and then studied for a D.Phil. under the supervision of Roger Moorey completed in 2001. Andrew Sherratt was a notable influence during Wengrow's time at Oxford.

== Academic career ==
Between 2001 and 2004 Wengrow was Henri Frankfort Fellow at the Warburg Institute and Junior Research Fellow at Christ Church, Oxford. He was appointed to a lectureship at the UCL Institute of Archaeology in 2004, and in 2011 he was made Professor of Comparative Archaeology (a post formerly held by Peter Ucko). Wengrow has conducted archaeological excavations in Africa and the Middle East, most recently with the Sulaymaniyah Museum in Iraqi Kurdistan. He is the author of three books and numerous academic articles on topics including the origins of writing, ancient art, Neolithic societies, and the emergence of the first states in Egypt and Mesopotamia. In 2020 Wengrow completed a book on the history of inequality with the anthropologist David Graeber just three weeks before Graeber's death. The Dawn of Everything: A New History of Humanity was published in the autumn of 2021.

== Honours ==
Wengrow is a recipient of the Antiquity Prize and has delivered the Rostovtzeff Lectures (New York University), the Jack Goody Lectures (Max Planck Institute) the Biennial Henry Myers Lecture (Royal Anthropological Institute of Great Britain), the Radcliffe-Brown Lecture in Social Anthropology (British Academy), and the Sigmund H. Danziger Jr. Memorial Lecture in the Humanities (University of Chicago). He served as external coordinator of the Mellon Research Initiative at New York University's Institute of Fine Arts and was Distinguished Visitor at the University of Auckland. In 2023, Wengrow was awarded the Albertus Magnus Professorship by the University of Cologne, among the university's highest academic honours, with previous recipients including such renowned scientists and researchers as Michael Tomasello, Bruno Latour, and Judith Butler. He is an elected Fellow of the Society of Antiquaries. In 2025, Wengrow was awarded the J.I. Staley Prize for exceptional scholarship by the School for Advanced Research.

== Selected publications ==
=== Books ===
- The Archaeology of Early Egypt: Social Transformations in North-East Africa, 10,000–2650 BC. Cambridge: Cambridge University Press 2006.
- What Makes Civilization?: The Ancient Near East and the Future of the West. Oxford & New York: Oxford University Press 2010.
- The Origins of Monsters: Image and Cognition in the First Age of Mechanical Reproduction. Princeton, NJ: Princeton University Press 2014.
- The Dawn of Everything: A New History of Humanity (co-authored with David Graeber). New York City: Farrar, Straus and Giroux 2021

=== Short essays ===
- "A History of True Civilisation is Not One of Monuments". Aeon 2018.
- (co-authored with David Graeber). "How to Change the Course of Human History (At Least the Part That's Already Happened)". Eurozine 2018.
- "Rethinking Cities from the Ground Up". The British Academy 2019.
- (co-authored with David Graeber). "Hiding in Plain Sight: Democracy's Indigenous Origins in the Americas". Laphams Quarterly 2020
- "Apocalypse No! Pseudo-Archaeology, Ancient Tech-Lords, and Ordinary People.". The Nation 2022.
- "Beyond kingdoms and empires: an archaeological revolution transforms our image of human freedoms". Aeon 2024.
