= Bullshit Jobs =

2018 book by David Graeber

- Author: David Graeber
- Subject: Organizational culture, cultural anthropology, critique of work, white-collar worker
- Published: May 2018 (Simon & Schuster)
- Pages: 368
- ISBN: 978-1-5011-4331-1

Bullshit Jobs: A Theory is a 2018 book by the American anthropologist David Graeber that postulates the existence of meaningless jobs which cause psychological harm. He contends that over half of societal work is pointless and becomes psychologically destructive (when paired with a work ethic that associates work with self-worth) because workers are required to pretend their role is not as pointless or harmful as they know it to be. Graeber classifies a job as bullshit if society would be no worse off (or even notice) if such job(s) disappeared, and names five classes of meaningless jobs: flunkies, goons, duct tapers, box tickers, and taskmasters. He argues that the association of labor with virtuous suffering is recent in human history and proposes universal basic income as a potential solution which would allow individuals to choose how they would like to contribute to humanity.

The book is an extension of Graeber's popular 2013 essay, which was later translated into 12 languages and whose underlying premise became the subject of a YouGov poll. Graeber solicited hundreds of testimonials from workers with jobs they felt were meaningless and revised his essay's case into book form; Simon & Schuster published the book in May 2018.

Most reviewers and two studies agreed with the thesis that many people do not feel like their job makes "a meaningful contribution to the world," but did not agree with the reasons Graeber gave. He contends that bullshit jobs are the reason people are not working 15-hour weeks, as predicted in 1930 by John Maynard Keynes, but he did not acknowledge that working hours have declined and quality of life has improved vastly since then. While he stated that both political parties support the idea of "more jobs" (whether or not they are good jobs) and that citizens are less likely to revolt against a government if they are employed, he never directly proposed that bullshit jobs may exist as a form of workfare, to provide employment as social welfare to otherwise un-employable people. Two studies found that while Graeber claimed that an increasing number (from 20-60%) of all jobs are useless, less than 8% of European workers reported feeling that their job is useless, and those numbers are declining rather than growing. Additionally, European essential workers like garbage collectors or janitors more often felt like their jobs were useless than people in jobs classified by Graeber as useless. The studies concluded that Graeber's theories are insufficient to explain why workers feel their jobs are not socially useful and that toxic work culture and bad management were better explanations for those feelings.

== History ==
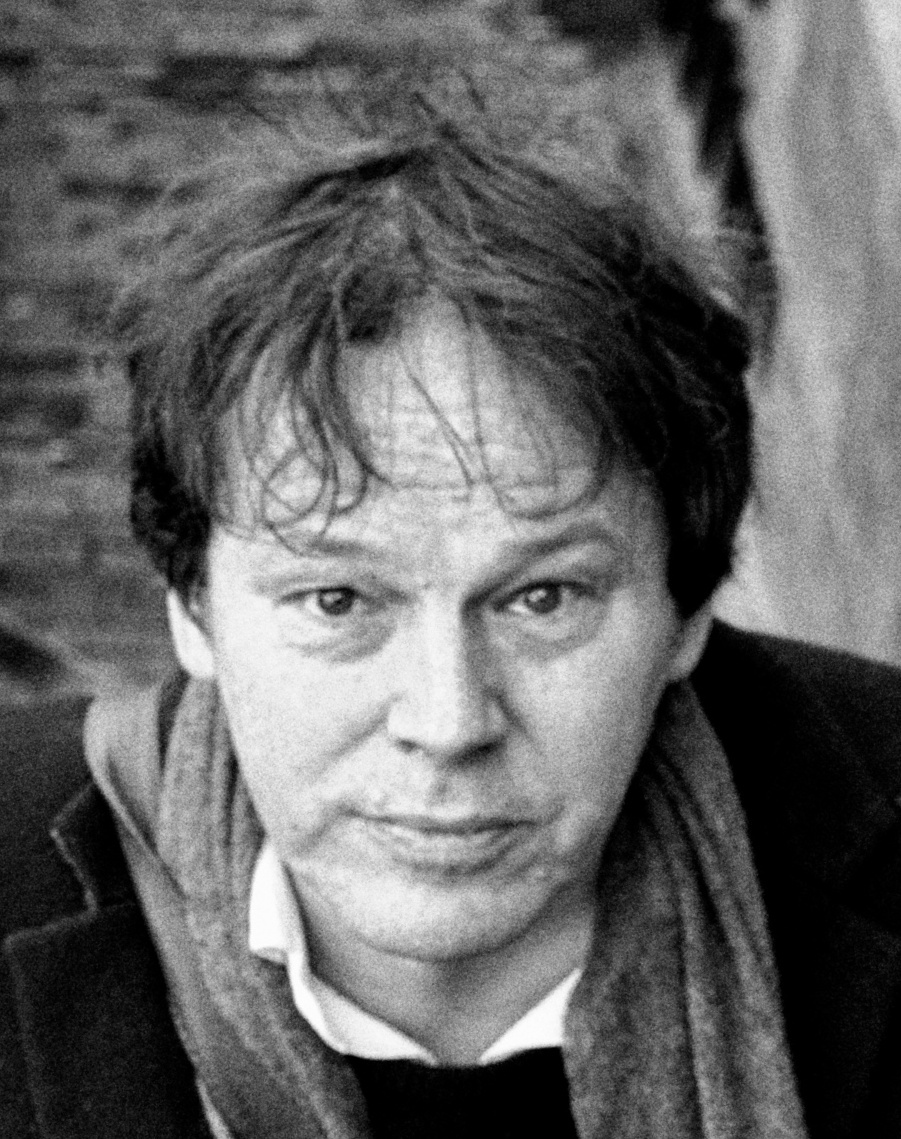
Graeber in 2015

In 2013, Graeber published an essay in the radical magazine Strike! named "On the Phenomenon of Bullshit Jobs", which argued the pointlessness of many contemporary jobs, particularly those in fields of finance, law, human resources, public relations, and consultancy. It received over one million views and was subsequently translated into 12 languages.

YouGov undertook a related poll, in which 37% of surveyed Britons thought that their jobs did not contribute 'meaningfully' to the world. In opposition to Graeber's claim that "most people hate their job," the same survey also found that 63% of respondents said that their jobs were "personally fulfilling" and a 2016 Ipsos study found that 71% of Britons reported positive feelings towards their job.

Graeber subsequently solicited hundreds of job testimonials and expanded his essay into a book which includes many of those anecdotes, Bullshit Jobs: A Theory.

The book was translated into French, German, Italian, Spanish, Polish, and Chinese.

== Summary ==
Graeber interviewed at De Balie on the premise of the book, June 2018

Graeber states that the productivity benefits of automation have not led to a 15-hour workweek, as predicted by economist John Maynard Keynes in 1930, but instead to what he calls "bullshit jobs": "a form of paid employment that is so completely pointless, unnecessary, or pernicious that even the employee cannot justify its existence even though, as part of the conditions of employment, the employee feels obliged to pretend that this is not the case". However, a journalist who reviewed his book stated that Graeber's claim is inconsistent with the fact the average British worker in 2018 works only 31 hours, much less than the average for 1900 of 56 hours per week.

Graeber states that today's arbitrary 9am to 5pm working hours do not likely coincide with productive needs of most occupations, and points out that occupations such as farmers, fishers, soldiers, and novelists vary the intensity of their work based on the urgency to produce and the natural cycles of productivity that consists of sprints followed by low periods of unproductive work.

According to Graeber, many people who are working these "bullshit" or pointless jobs know that they are working jobs that do not contribute to society in a meaningful way. He posits that instead of producing more jobs that are fulfilling for our environment, technology and machines create meaningless jobs to provide everyone with an opportunity to work. While these jobs can offer good compensation and ample free time, the pointlessness of the work grates at people's humanity and creates a "profound psychological violence", and "a scar across our collective soul". Graeber describes the uncertainty and confusion of this situation as a type of scriptlessness where workers lack social codes for how to feel or how to relate to each other.

Graeber's test for whether a job is a bullshit job or not is whether society would be any worse off (or even notice) if such jobs disappeared entirely overnight.

Graeber states that more than half of societal work is pointless, both large parts of some jobs and five types of entirely pointless jobs:

1. Flunkies, who serve to make their superiors feel important, e.g., receptionists, administrative assistants, door attendants, store greeters;
2. Goons, who act to harm or deceive others on behalf of their employer, or to prevent other goons from doing so, e.g., lobbyists, corporate lawyers, telemarketers, public relations specialists;
3. Duct tapers, who temporarily fix problems that could be fixed permanently, e.g., programmers repairing shoddy code, airline desk staff who calm passengers with lost luggage;
4. Box tickers, who create the appearance that something useful is being done when it is not, e.g., survey administrators, in-house magazine journalists, corporate compliance officers, academic administration;
5. Taskmasters, who create extra work for those who do not need it, e.g., middle management, leadership professionals.

According to Graeber, these jobs are largely in the private sector despite the idea that market competition would root out such inefficiencies. He claims that the rise of service sector jobs owes less to economic need than to "managerial feudalism", in which employers need underlings in order to feel important and maintain competitive status and power. He states that the Puritan-capitalist work ethic is to be credited for making the labor of capitalism into religious duty: advances in productivity did not lead to a reduced workday because, as a societal norm, people believe that work determines their self-worth, even if they find that work pointless.

Work as a source of virtue is a recent idea. In fact, work was disdained by the aristocracy in classical times but inverted as virtuous through then-radical philosophers like John Locke. The Puritan idea of virtue through suffering justified the toil of the working classes as noble. Graeber argues that bullshit jobs justify contemporary patterns of living: that the pains of dull work are suitable justification for the ability to fulfill consumer desires, and that fulfilling those desires could be considered as the reward for suffering through pointless work in contemporary society. He claims that over time, the prosperity extracted from technological advances has been reinvested into industry and consumer growth for its own sake rather than the purchase of additional leisure time from work. He also claims that bullshit jobs serve political ends, because political parties are more concerned about having jobs than whether the jobs are fulfilling, and citizenry occupied with busy work have less motivation to revolt.

The solution Graeber offers is a universal basic income, which would allow people to not need to work a "bullshit job." He also states that it doesn't need to be a basic income, but just some way that society can enable individuals to decide for themselves how they will contribute to humanity. He feels that society needs a significant cultural paradigm shift with regards to the importance placed on careers and lifestyles more generally.

== Reception ==
A review in The Times praises the book's academic rigor and humor, especially in some job examples, but altogether felt that Graeber's argument was "enjoyably overstated". The reviewer found Graeber's historical work ethic argument convincing, but offered counterarguments on other points: that the average British workweek has decreased from 56 hours in 1900 to 31 hours in 2018, that Graeber's argument for the overall proportion of pointless work is overreliant on the YouGov survey, and that the same survey does not hold that "most people hate their jobs". The reviewer maintains that while "managerial feudalism" can explain the existence of flunkies, Graeber's other types of bullshit jobs owe their existence to competition, government regulation, long supply chains, and the withering of inefficient companies—the same ingredients responsible for luxuries of advanced capitalism such as smartphones and year-round produce.

Andrew Anthony reviewed the book in 2018 and said: "With its snarky tone and laboured arguments, I'm not sure this is the book to ignite a larger debate. Despite its length, it doesn't develop a theory that's notably more sophisticated than the Strike! essay. Too much time is spent on nailing down flip typologies. According to Graeber, there are five different kinds of bullshit job, which he labels: flunkies, goons, duct-tapers, box-tickers and taskmasters. On closer inspection, they seem like arbitrary distinctions that add little to our understanding. But Graeber is clearly right when he notes that as individuals we crave something more than social acceptance – we also hanker after meaning."

Nathan Heller agreed overall with the existence of bullshit jobs, but challenged Graeber's reasons for why they exist. Heller posited that some bullshit jobs may serve to teach young people skills or traits that will be necessary in their later careers, and that other bullshit jobs exist for political reasons as a form of workfare, providing otherwise un-employable people with the appearance of self-sufficiency rather than sitting at home and receiving a monthly welfare check.

=== Academic studies ===
A 2021 study of European Union workers empirically tested several of the book's claims, such as that bullshit jobs were increasing over time and that they accounted for much of the workforce. Using data from the EU-conducted European Working Conditions Survey, the study found that a low and declining proportion of employees considered their jobs to be "rarely" or "never" useful. The study also found that while there was some correlation between occupation and feelings of uselessness, they did not correspond neatly with Graeber's theory; bullshit "taskmasters" and "goons" such as hedge-fund managers or lobbyists reported that they were vastly satisfied with their work, while essential workers like refuse collectors and cleaners often felt their jobs were useless. However, the study did confirm that feeling like one's job is not useful was correlated to poor psychological health and higher rates of depression and anxiety. To account for the serious observed effects of feeling like one's work is useless, the authors instead draw on the Marxist concept of alienation and suggest that toxic management and work culture may lead individuals to feel that their work is not beneficial to society.

A 2023 study of United States workers, using data from the American Working Conditions Survey, concluded that workers in occupations labelled as socially useless by Graeber were more likely to perceive their job as socially useless, after controlling for other factors. The authors suggest the discrepancy between their findings and Soffia et al.'s study (above) could be their use of regression models that control for other factors, or that Graeber's theories are more applicable to "heavily financialized Anglo-Saxon countries." They conclude that Graeber's theory by itself cannot explain people's perceptions of the social value of their work.

== See also ==
- Critique of work
- Decent work – Employment that respects the fundamental rights of the human person
- Make-work job – Non-market jobs used to reduce unemployment
- On Bullshit by Harry Frankfurt
- Parkinson's law – Adage that work expands to fill its available time
- Refusal of work
- Tang ping – Chinese neologism, "lying flat"
- Ghost job – Job posting for a non-existent or already filled position
