= Association of Social Anthropologists =

UK learned society

The Association of Social Anthropologists of the UK and Commonwealth is a learned society in the United Kingdom dedicated to promoting the academic discipline of social anthropology. It is a member of the Academy of Social Sciences.
