= On Kings =

2017 book

- Author: David Graeber, Marshall Sahlins
- Publisher: University of Chicago Press
- Publication date: 2017
- Publication place: United States of America
- ISBN: 978-0-9861325-0-6

On Kings is a collaborative work by anthropologists David Graeber and Marshall Sahlins that addresses the question of kingship.

Published in 2017, it is Graeber's eighth book. The work is structured as a collection of essays written by the two anthropologists, presented in the form of a dialogue.

== Contents ==
The book opens with a reflection on kingship, noting that it might be the most common political system in human history and is fundamentally religious in nature. It is also described as a political system that is very difficult to abolish, with most modern revolutions merely transferring the attributes of monarchy into the framework of popular sovereignty.

In the book, Graeber, influenced by Sahlins, his mentor, argues that:

humans have traditionally, and even into modern times, understood their existence within political systems involving and intertwined with "metahuman persons"—that is, spirits, gods, demons, superheroes, goblins, elves, and a range of entities that behave more or less like people but possess powers distinct from those of ordinary humans, sometimes far exceeding them.

The anthropologist also takes a stand on controversial points in political anthropology; he argues that kingship draws inspiration from the celestial world, rather than the other way around, following Hocart. In this debate, he asserts that 'what is generally considered the divinization of human leaders is, from a historical perspective, better described as the humanization of the god'.

Graeber and Sahlins propose the hypothesis that the use of ancestors and divine agents to legitimize and consolidate power is a universal tendency among rulers. They refer to this tendency as "galactic mimesis".

== Legacy ==
The work is described as "important and provocative" by Christopher John Smith.
