= HAU: Journal of Ethnographic Theory =

Open-access, anthropology academic journal

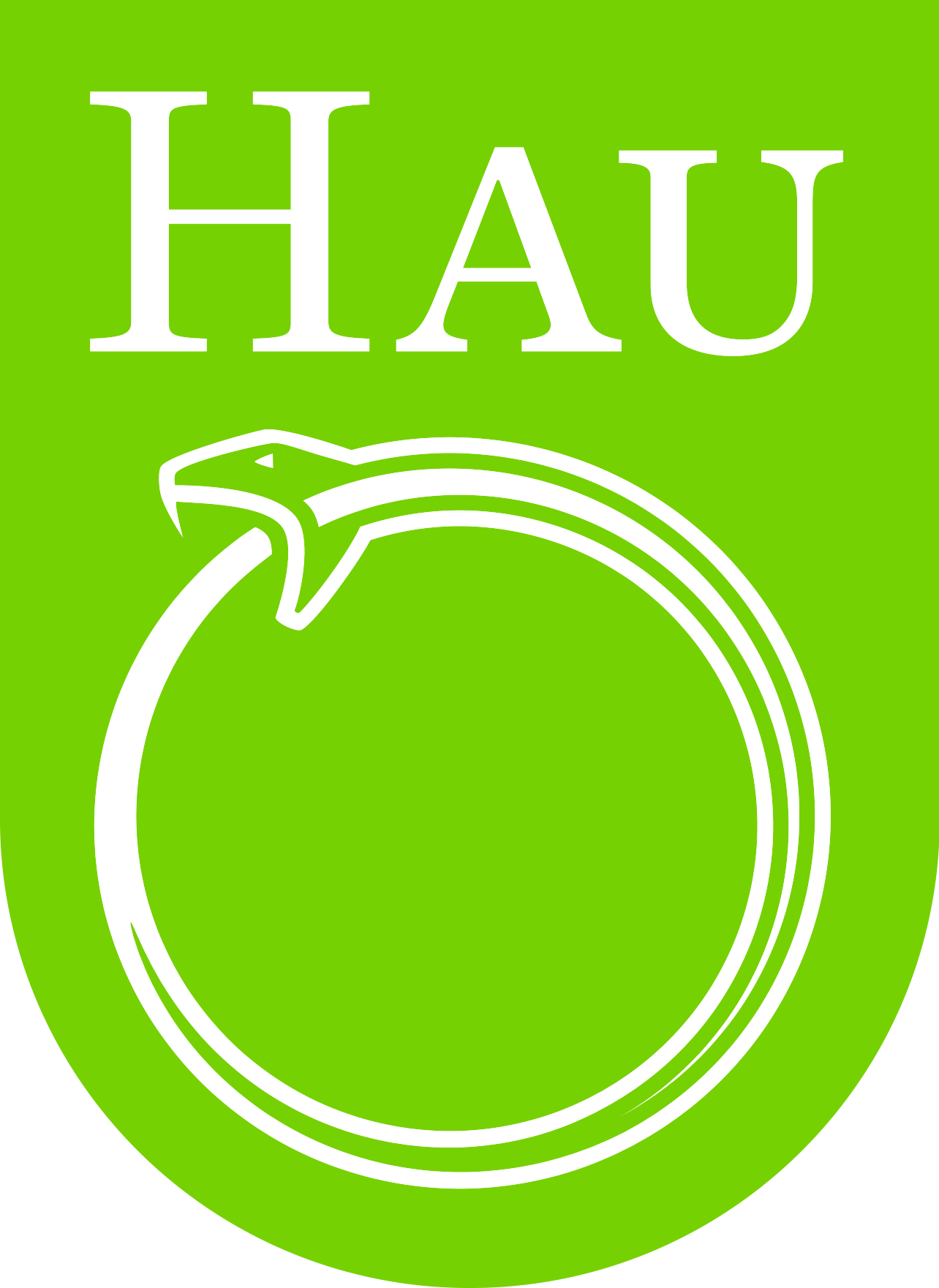
- Discipline: Anthropology
- Language: English
- Edited by: Editorial Collective: Louisa Lombard, Adeline Masquelier, and Michael Herzfeld

Publication details
- History: 2011–present
- Publisher: University of Chicago Press and Society for Ethnographic Theory (United Kingdom)
- Frequency: Triannual
- Open access: 2011–2017, Subscription from 2018 with one-month free access after publication, and five articles/issue remaining permanently open access. All HAU Journal content published from 2011–2017 is open access.
- Impact factor: H Index: 28 (2020)

Standard abbreviations
- ISO 4: HAU: J. Ethnogr. Theory

Indexing
- ISSN: 2049-1115

Links
- Journal homepage; Online access; Online archive

HAU: Journal of Ethnographic Theory is a triannual peer-reviewed academic journal, published by the Society for Ethnographic Theory. The Society also publishes HAU Books, a book series with over 42 titles and that is committed to open access anthropology.

HAU took inspiration for its name from Marcel Mauss' usage of the Māori concept of hau in his book The Gift. Mauss' anthropological concept of hau invites people to explore how encounters with alterity occasion the opportunity to build theory from indigenous knowledge practices. The journal addresses topics such as indigenous ontologies and systems of knowledge, forms of human engagement and relationality, cosmology and myth, magic, witchcraft and sorcery, truth and falsehood, indigenous theories of kinship and relatedness with humans and non-humans, hierarchy, materiality, perception, environment and space, time and temporality, personhood and subjectivity, and alternative metaphysics of morality.

HAU was co-founded in 2011 by Giovanni da Col and Justin Shaffner, who at the time were graduate students in Social Anthropology at the University of Cambridge. As of January 2019, the journal is ranked seventh in Google Scholar's top publication list for anthropology (fourth among the socio-cultural anthropology journals). The journal is abstracted and indexed in Scopus, with a 2019 citescore index of 1.16.

== Ethnographic theory ==
According to the journal's first foreword or manifesto, "The Return of Ethnographic Theory", written by Giovanni da Col together with David Graeber, ethnographic theory entails "the destruction of any firm sense of place that can only be resolved by the imaginative formulation of novel worldviews". The mission of the journal was motivated by the need to reinstate ethnographic theorization in contemporary anthropology as a potent alternative to paradigms derived from largely European philosophical arguments, which had resulted in a loss of the discipline's distinctive theoretical nerve.

== Open access model ==
The journal was founded with a commitment to open dissemination of anthropology "...HAU is committed to becoming an Open Access alternative to commercial publishing in anthropology by taking advantage of the lower costs of production that internet distribution allows". The open access publishing model, called HAU-NET, relied on income from key supporters to meet publication costs—mainly anthropology departments and libraries, totalling about 40 by 2017. It was reported in 2017 that this had not gone well in several respects with some core funding diminishing. The shift to a large university non-profit publisher and a sustainable hybrid model which could offer both free access after each issue release and gold open access to each issue's key articles was the outcome of the HAU Advisory Board deliberations. In a turnaround, commitment to OA publishing then took second place to the intellectual project: "Even if the current funding could allow open access to the journal and the book series for another one or two years, the difficulties of ensuring long-term sustainability encountered by other open journals and projects ... do not offer much hope at this historical conjuncture."

== Use of Māori concept "Hau" ==
In 2018 a collective of New Zealand and Māori scholars published a statement criticizing the journal's choice of name, since hau is a Māori religious concept. Arguing that this Maori concept has become anthropologist's common parlance and the journal had stated the original inspiration came from Marcel Mauss's usage of the term, the board of trustees responded with a statement apologizing for not running it by the Mahi Tahi collective for a consultation. They also clarified that a Māori scholar, Paul Tapsell, was invited to join the journal's first editorial board and endorsed the project.

== #hautalk controversy ==
In 2018, allegations of workplace abuse were raised by David Graeber and in two anonymous open letters written by former HAU staff members. These accusations were made against the then editor-in-chief Giovanni Da Col. Other accusations included physical and emotional abuse, bullying, harassment and financial misconduct. Known by the hashtag #hautalk the discussion spread to the wider anthropology community, and was described as "anthropology’s #MeToo movement". HAU critics felt that the incident reflected systemic power imbalances within anthropology as an academic discipline. The internal structuring of HAU was also scrutinised as the large amount of power Da Col had was seen as one of the reasons these situations could occur. Da Col resigned as HAU editor-in-chief in 2019 and stayed on as an editor of HAU Books until 2020.
