= The Democracy Project =

Book by David Graeber

- Author: David Graeber
- Subject: Memoir, Occupy Wall Street, anarchism
- Published: 2013 (Spiegel & Grau)
- Pages: 318
- ISBN: 978-0-8129-9356-1

Graeber on the Occupy movement

The Democracy Project: A History, a Crisis, a Movement is anthropologist David Graeber's 2013 book-length, inside account of the Occupy Wall Street movement. Graeber evaluates the beginning of the movement, the source of its efficacy, and the reason for its eventual demise. Interspersed is a history of democracy, both direct and indirect, throughout many different times and places. In contrast to many other evaluations of OWS Graeber takes a distinctly positive tone, advocating both for the value of OWS and its methods of Direct democracy. The book was published by Spiegel & Grau.

Another book on Graeber's experiences with Occupy was published in German as Inside Occupy.
