= The Baffler =

American left-wing magazine

- Editor: Matthew Shen Goodman
- Former editors: Jonathon Sturgeon
- Frequency: Bi-monthly
- Founder: Thomas Frank; Keith White
- First issue: 1988
- Company: The Baffler Foundation
- Country: United States
- Based in: Charlottesville (1988–1990); Chicago (1990–2010); Cambridge, Massachusetts (2011–present); New York City (2015–present)
- Language: English
- Website: thebaffler.com
- ISSN: 1059-9789

The Baffler is an American magazine of left-wing cultural, political, and business analysis. Established in 1988 by editors Thomas Frank and Keith White, it was headquartered in Chicago, Illinois, until 2010, when it moved to Cambridge, Massachusetts. In 2016, it moved its headquarters to New York City. The first incarnation of The Baffler had up to 12,000 subscribers.

As of 2016, the magazine and its collections of essays were distributed through bookstores in the United States, Canada, and the United Kingdom.

== History ==
The magazine was first published by Greg Lane. Its motto was "the journal that blunts the cutting edge." It became known for critiquing "business culture and the culture business" and having exposed the grunge speak hoax perpetrated on The New York Times. One famous and much-republished article, "The Problem with Music" by Steve Albini, exposed the inner workings of the music business during the indie rock heyday.

The magazine is credited with having helped launch the careers of several writers, including founding editor Thomas Frank, Ana Marie Cox, and Rick Perlstein.

=== Issues ===
The magazine published sporadically, first once a year then slightly more often, but that slowed down after the Chicago office of The Baffler was destroyed in a fire on April 25, 2001. Publishing became more regular and frequent after its relaunch and move to Cambridge in 2011. Timeline of publication:

Year	#	Year	#	Year	#	Year	#
1988	1	1996	8	2010	18	2017	34–37
1990	2	1997	9–11	2012	19–21	2018	38–42
1991	3	1999	12–13	2013	22–23	2019	43–48
1992	4	2001	14	2014	24–26	2020	49–54
1993	5	2003	15–16	2015	27–29	2021	55–60
1995	6–7	2006	17	2016	30–33		

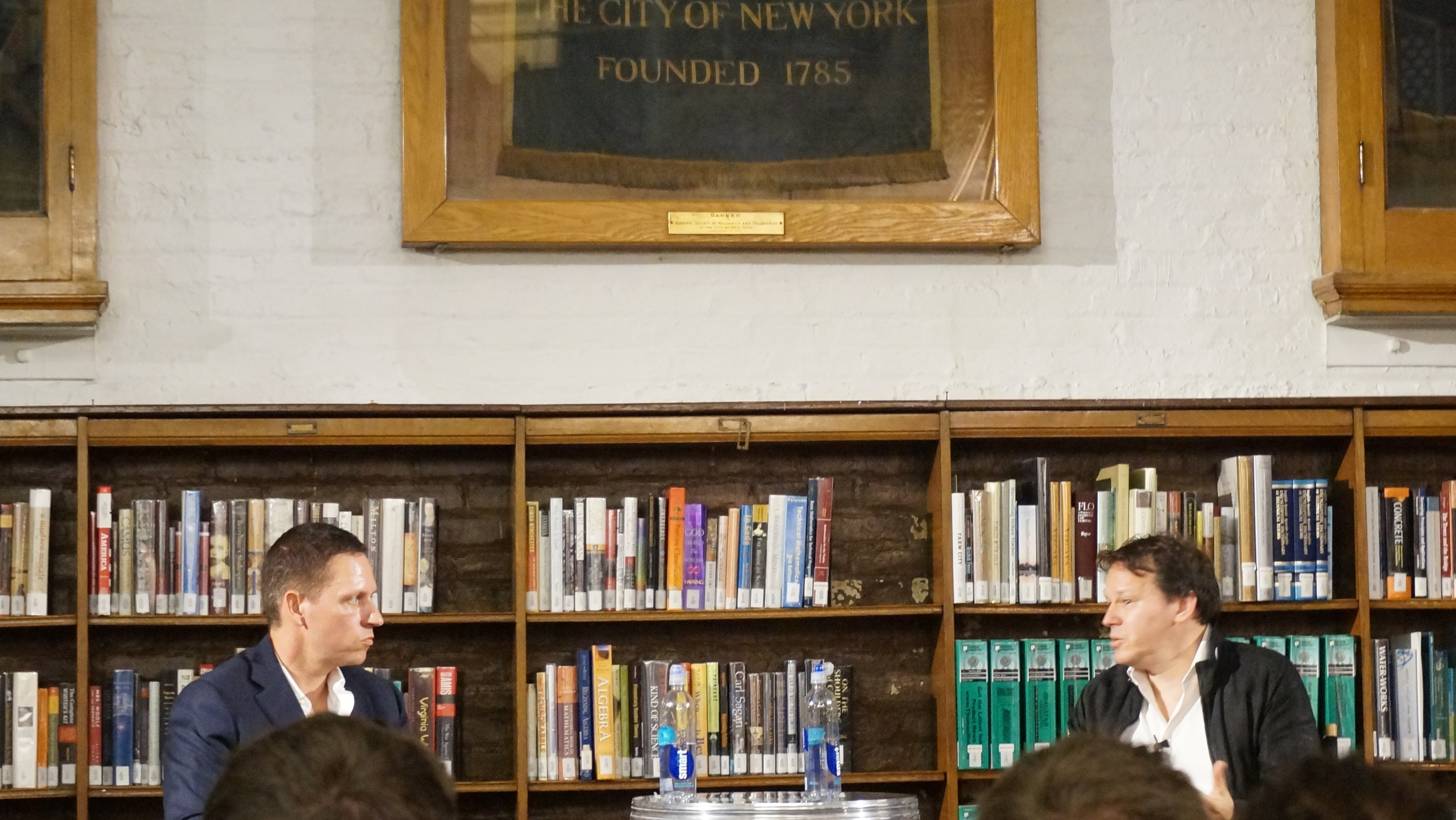
Peter Thiel and David Graeber debate at the "No Future for You" event hosted by The Baffler, NYC, 2014

The Baffler is sold through many different distribution channels, both as a book and as a magazine; in addition to the publication's ISSN, all but the earliest issues have an individual ISBN.

=== Relaunch and move ===
In 2009, founding editor Thomas Frank decided to revive the magazine. It was relaunched with Volume 2, Issue 1 (#18) in 2010, with a new publisher, editors, and design.

In 2011, The Baffler moved its headquarters to Cambridge, and John Summers took over as editor. The magazine signed a publishing contract with the MIT Press, and after another redesign, began publishing three times a year. In 2014, it ended that contract and brought publishing operations in house. In 2016, the magazine changed to a quarterly schedule and moved its headquarters to New York City. Summers left in 2016 and Chris Lehmann took over the editorship of the journal. In 2019, Lehmann departed for The New Republic, and Jonathon Sturgeon became editor in chief.

The Baffler has also organized literary events and debates with its contributing editors. In 2014, Peter Thiel, the co-founder of Palantir and PayPal, and David Graeber, an anarchistic anthropologist and a Baffler contributing editor, publicly debated the future of technology.

In 2017, The Baffler and CTXT, a Spanish independent online publication, began a collaborative editorial agreement.

== Collections and books ==
In addition to the magazine, The Baffler has published a few collections of its essays and other writings.

- Commodify Your Dissent: Salvos from The Baffler. Edited by Thomas Frank and Matt Weiland. Norton, 1997. ISBN 0-393-31673-4
- Boob Jubilee: The Cultural Politics of the New Economy (Salvos from The Baffler). Edited by Thomas Frank and David Mulcahey. Norton, 2003. ISBN 0-393-32430-3
- Cotton Tenants: Three Families. Edited by John Summers. Melville House, 2012. Excerpts from a lost manuscript on Alabama tenant farmers by the writer James Agee. ISBN 978-1612192123
- No Future For You: Salvos from The Baffler. Edited by John Summers, Chris Lehmann and Thomas Frank. MIT Press, 2014. ISBN 978-0-262-02833-2 (Note: A French translation was published as Le Pire des Mondes Possibles by Editions Agone in 2015.)

== Podcasts ==
The Baffler has previously hosted the podcasts Whale Vomit, by Amber A'Lee Frost and Sam Kriss; News from Nowhere, by Corey Pein; and The Nostalgia Trap, by David Parsons.
