= Gable End Foreland =

- Location in New Zealand
- Coordinates: 38°31′39″S 178°17′33″E
- Country: New Zealand
- Region: Gisborne Region
- Time zone: UTC+12 (NZST)
  - Summer (DST): UTC+13 (NZDT)
- Area code: 06

Gable End Foreland is a prominent headland on the northeastern coast of New Zealand's North Island. It is located 30 kilometres northeast of Tuaheni Point and 20 kilometres south of Tolaga Bay.

The headland was named by Captain James Cook on his first voyage to New Zealand in 1769. The name reflects the similarity of the weathered cliff to a house gable.

An automated navigation light is situated on the foreland at an elevation of 210 metres.
