= Russian exploration of the Pacific Northwest =

The Russian Empire began its interest of the Pacific Northwest in the 18th century, initially curious if there was a land connection between the Eurasian and North American Continents. Two expeditions were led by Vitus Bering, with the findings proving the separation of two continents through the Bering Sea. Being the first European nation to chart much of what comprises the modern American state of Alaska, many locations retain Russian place names. The discovery of sizable fur bearing populations by Bering drew the attention of promyshlenniki previously engaged in the Siberian fur trade. Based out of the Siberian ports of Okhotsk or Petropavlovsk, fur trappers sailed and reported the location of land formations like the Aleutian Islands, Kodiak Island and portions of the Alaskan mainland. Relations with Native Alaskans was often tense due to the uncontrolled actions of particular promyshleniki who killed and raped Indigenous Alaskans on islands they trapped furs.

By the mid century the creation of companies was required to shoulder the increasing operational costs. Grigory Shelikhov was prominent amongst these rising merchants, creating Russian settlements on Kodiak Island and later perpetrating the deaths of many Alutiiqs in the Awa'uq Massacre. With the Ukase of 1799 the Russian Empire gave the United American Company (the successor to Shelikhov's organization) a monopoly among Russian fur companies over North America to the 55° N latitude. The newly formed Russian-American Company (RAC) was expected to additionally create new colonies to strengthen the Russian claims to the region. The RAC funded in part or wholly expeditions of the Imperial Russian Navy like the First Russian circumnavigation. The Russo-American Treaty of 1824 and the Russo-British Treaty of 1825 formalised the claims of Russian America, essentially the borders of Alaska.
