= Wicknell Chivayo =

Zimbabwean businessman

- Born: Wicknell Munodaani Chivayo; 22 November 1980; Chivhu, Zimbabwe
- Died: 30 September 2026 (aged 45); Marondera District, Zimbabwe
- Citizenship: Zimbabwean; Eswatini
- Occupation: Businessman
- Known for: Luxury car and cash giveaways; government contracts; Gwanda Solar Project; political connections
- Spouses: Sonja Madzikanda (m. 2017; div. 2024); Lucy Muteke (m. 2025; until their deaths in 2026)
- Children: 2

Wicknell Munodaani Chivayo (22 November 1980 - 30 September 2026), also known as Sir Wicknell, was a Zimbabwean businessman and the founder and managing director of Intratrek Zimbabwe (Private) Limited. He was known for his high-profile giveaways of luxury vehicles and large sums of money, his involvement in government tenders, his close public association with President Emmerson Mnangagwa and ZANU-PF, and a series of legal proceedings relating to fraud and money laundering allegations.

Intratrek Zimbabwe was awarded a contract in 2015 to construct a 100-megawatt solar power plant in Gwanda, for which it received an advance payment of US$5 million from the Zimbabwe Power Company (ZPC) without carrying out substantive work on the project. Chivayo faced multiple rounds of criminal prosecution over the advance payment, and was ultimately acquitted in 2024.

In 2024, leaked audio recordings linked him to a US$100 million contract for the supply of election materials to the Zimbabwe Electoral Commission (ZEC). The Zimbabwe Anti-Corruption Commission (ZACC) investigated and announced in December 2025 that it had found no evidence directly linking Chivayo to the transaction.

== Early life ==
Chivayo was born on 22 November 1980 and grew up in the Gandami area of Chivhu, Mashonaland East. His father, Isaac Mathias Chivayo, died in a car accident when Chivayo was approximately ten years old, after which he was raised by his mother.

He attended Dudley Hall Primary School and subsequently Churchill Boys High School for his secondary education. He left school in 1996 and worked as a wages clerk at a local bus company before becoming involved in illegal foreign currency exchange at the Union Avenue Flea Market (now Kwame Nkrumah Avenue) in Harare.

=== 2004 criminal conviction ===
In 2004, Chivayo was convicted of theft by false pretences involving approximately R837,000, arising from a foreign currency transaction in which he received money but did not complete his side of the exchange. He was sentenced to three years' imprisonment at Chikurubi Maximum Security Prison.

== Business career ==
=== Intratrek Zimbabwe ===
Chivayo is the founder and managing director of Intratrek Zimbabwe (Private) Limited, a company that has secured government contracts in the energy and infrastructure sectors. He has also been associated with IMC Communications, a telecommunications company.

=== Gwanda Solar Project ===
In 2015, Intratrek Zimbabwe was awarded a contract — valued at approximately US$172 million — to construct a 100-megawatt solar power plant in Gwanda, Matabeleland South, under a contract with the Zimbabwe Electricity Supply Authority (ZESA) and the Zimbabwe Power Company (ZPC). Intratrek received an advance payment of US$5 million from ZPC, but did not carry out substantive construction work on the project.

Parliamentary committee reviews found that advance payment certificates had been issued without corresponding progress, and that the advance had been paid without a required Advance Payment Guarantee.

In August 2018, Chivayo was arrested and charged with fraud, money laundering, and contravening the Exchange Control Act in connection with the advance payment. In March 2019, High Court judge Justice Ephraim Tagu upheld Chivayo's application for exception, ruling that the facts as stated did not disclose an offence, and the acquittal was subsequently formalised at the magistrate court level.

The Prosecutor General appealed the acquittal. In June 2020, the Supreme Court of Zimbabwe reversed the High Court ruling and ordered that Chivayo stand trial. Following subsequent proceedings at the magistrate court, Chivayo was again acquitted in 2024, with the court ruling that the state had failed to establish a prima facie case. A separate charge of bribing former ZPC board chairman Stanley Kazhanje with US$10,000 to influence the tender award was also dismissed.

In March 2025, Energy Minister July Moyo announced that the government was reviewing the Gwanda contract with Intratrek with a view to reviving the project under revised terms and updated technical specifications.

=== ZEC election materials contract ===
In 2024, leaked audio recordings linked Chivayo, along with associates Mike Chimombe and Moses Mpofu, to a US$100 million contract awarded to supply election materials to the Zimbabwe Electoral Commission (ZEC) ahead of the 2023 Zimbabwean general election. The ZACC investigated and announced in December 2025 that no evidence had been found directly implicating Chivayo in the transaction.

=== Other legal proceedings ===
In 2011, Chivayo was arrested on eight counts of fraud and money laundering, and five of his vehicles were confiscated by the state. He was acquitted of all eight counts following trial.

Chivayo was separately acquitted of fraud charges he faced jointly with musician Genius Kadungure, relating to approximately R1.5 million allegedly defrauded from Kadoma miners and ZANU-PF MP Dexter Nduna.

== Political associations ==
Chivayo is a publicly declared supporter of ZANU-PF and has stated his backing for President Emmerson Mnangagwa, including publicly endorsing calls for Mnangagwa to serve beyond constitutional term limits.

In January 2025, Chivayo publicly criticised Acting President Constantino Chiwenga, describing him as a "failed politician" following Chiwenga's public remarks on corruption within ZANU-PF.

== Public gifts and spending ==
Chivayo is publicly known for high-value gifts made to musicians, journalists, sports organisations, and security forces. An investigation by Zimbabwean media reported that he spent over US$9.3 million on luxury cars and gifts within a twelve-month period.

Reported gifts include a 2025 Toyota Land Cruiser VXR and US$100,000 in cash to broadcaster Reuben Barwe in May 2025; a 2025 Range Rover Autobiography and US$150,000 in cash to musician Jah Prayzah in May 2025; vehicles totalling R7.2 million to Zimbabwe Football Association president Nqobile Magwizi across two occasions in 2025 and 2026; R10.4 million and a bus to Highlanders F.C. ahead of the 2026 season; and 20 luxury vehicles and US$2 million to the Zimbabwe Defence Forces, Zimbabwe Republic Police, and Zimbabwe Prisons Service in December 2025.

In January 2025, Chivayo was accused of attempting to influence Zimbabwe Football Association (ZIFA) elections by promising vehicles and financial incentives to voters. He denied the allegations.

== Personal life ==
Chivayo paid lobola for Sonja Madzikanda in July 2017 and held a formal wedding ceremony in December 2017, with the bride price reported as US$50,000. The couple divorced in 2024. Chivayo stated that the primary reason was irreconcilable tensions between Madzikanda and his family, and that he continues to financially support his former wife and their two children.

In March 2025, Chivayo married Lucy Muteke. The couple held traditional and religious wedding ceremonies, including a celebration within the Johane Masowe eChishanu congregation.

== Death ==
Chivayo and his wife died on 30 September 2026 when a helicopter they were travelling in crashed in the Marondera District.

== See also ==
- Zimbabwe Electoral Commission
- ZANU-PF
- Emmerson Mnangagwa
- Jah Prayzah
