= Sahlins–Obeyesekere debate =

Anthropology debate

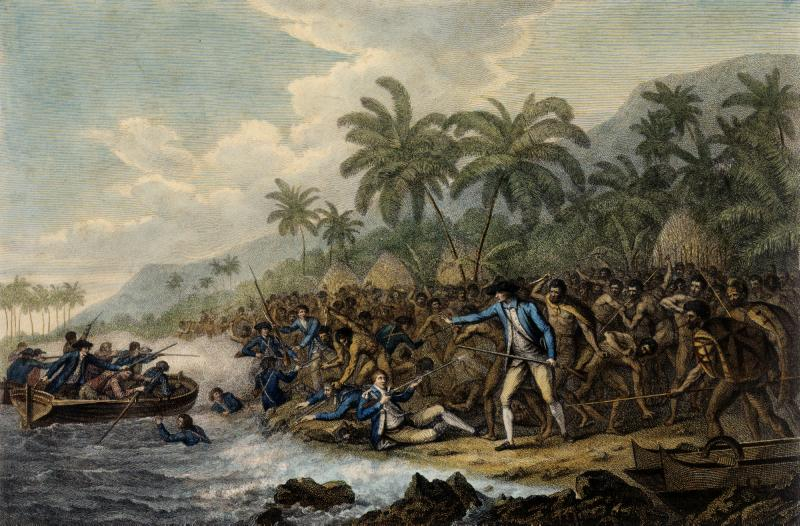
Painting, Death of Captain Cook by eyewitness John Webber

The Sahlins–Obeyesekere debate is an academic controversy in anthropology about the death of the British explorer James Cook, particularly whether the native Hawaiians believed him to be Lono, an akua "deity" associated with fertility, agriculture, rainfall, music and peace.

The debate took shape in 1992, when Gananath Obeyesekere published The Apotheosis of Captain Cook, which criticized the work of Marshall Sahlins on the issue.

In addition to the factual issues, the debate has become symbolic of deeper issues in anthropology, including whether Western scholars can understand non-Western cultures.
