= Matthew Engelke =

American anthropologist (born 1972)

Matthew Engelke (born 1972) is an anthropologist and author specializing in religion, media, public culture, secularism, and humanism. Regionally, his ethnographic focus is on Zimbabwe and the United Kingdom.

== Education and career ==
He received his bachelor's degree from the University of Chicago in 1994 and graduated with a Ph.D. in Anthropology from the University of Virginia in 2002.

Engelke taught at the Department of Anthropology in the London School of Economics and Political Science from 2002–2018. In 2018, he left his position at the London School of Economics and became a professor at the Department of Religion at Columbia University; he is also the director of the Institute for Religion, Culture, and Public life at Columbia. He has taught summer seminars at the School of Criticism and Theory at Cornell University.

He is the executive editor of Prickly Paradigm Press and is the Anthropology and Religion section editor for Public Books. Additionally, he was the editor for the Journal of the Royal Anthropological Institute from 2010–2013, and previously wrote as a columnist for The Guardian.

== Works ==
Engelke is the author of three books. His first book, A Problem of Presence: Beyond Scripture in An African church, published in 2007, is a study of the Friday Masowe apostolics of Zimbabwe (founded by Johane Masowe). The text focuses on how the rejection of biblical textual authority creates a situation where certain semiotic forms of speech and song are understood by believers as 'live and direct' expressions of divine presence. The book was awarded the Geertz Prize in the Anthropology of Religion in 2008 and the 2009 Victor Turner Prize for Ethnographic Writing.

His second book, God's Agents: Biblical Publicity in Contemporary England, published in 2013, is an ethnography of the British and Foreign Bible Society and focuses on how the charitable organization worked to 'publicize' the Bible in an effectively secular nation.

His third book, How to Think Like an Anthropologist was published in the United Kingdom in 2017 as a part of the Pelican Books imprint. The book is an introduction to anthropology for non-specialists and stresses the importance of learning "to think critically about our own assumptions regarding people across the globe who may seem exotic to us" by avoiding "exoticizing these 'others'" without "reducing cultural differences to the point of inconsequence."

== Major publications ==
- The Problem of Belief: Evans-Pritchard and Victor Turner on “The Inner Life.” Anthropology Today 18(6): 3-8. (2002)
- A Problem of Presence: Beyond Scripture in an African Church (2007)
- Past Pentecostalism: Rupture, Realignment, and Everyday Life in Pentecostal and African Independent Churches. Africa 80(2): 177-199. (2010)
- Angels in Swindon: Public Religion and Ambient Faith in England. American Ethnologist 39(1): 150-165. (2012)
- God’s Agents: Biblical Publicity in Contemporary England (2013)
- Christianity and the Anthropology of Secular Humanism. Current anthropology 55(S10): S292-S301 (2014)
- Secular Shadows: African, Immanent, Post-colonial. Critical Research on Religion 3(1): 86-100. (2015)
- How to Think Like an Anthropologist (2017)
- The Anthropology of Death Revisited. Annual Review of Anthropology 48: 29-44. (2019)
