= Prickly Paradigm Press =

- Founded: 1993
- Founder: Anna Grimshaw, Keith Hart, Marshall Sahlins
- Successor: Peter Sahlins, Ramona Naddaff
- Country of origin: United States
- Headquarters location: Chicago, Illinois
- Distribution: Chicago Distribution Center
- Publication types: Pamphlets
- Imprints: Ode Books
- Official website: pricklyparadigm.com

Prickly Paradigm Press is an independent publisher distributed by University of Chicago Press. The press publishes short-form works that engage anthropology, critical theory and history to engage contemporary questions of urgent concern. Since 2002, the press has been dedicated to reviving the pamphlet. Notable pamphlets include David Graeber's Fragments of an Anarchist Anthropology and Donna Haraway's Companion Species Manifesto.

== History ==
The press was founded as Prickly Pear Pamphlets in 1993 by anthropologists Keith Hart and Anna Grimshaw. Based in Cambridge, England, they published ten pamphlets on topics in anthropology, the history of science, and ethnographic film. They published authors such as historian of science Simon Schaffer (From Physics to Anthropology –– and Back Again in 1994) and anthropologist Marilyn Strathern (The Relation in 1995). In 1998, Mark Harris and Matthew Engelke took over the press, expanding its operations in the world market and adding a select few titles to its list.

In 2001, University of Chicago anthropologist Marshall Sahlins (1930-2021) took over as publisher, renaming it Prickly Paradigm. Under Sahlins' stewardship, the press published 50+ pamphlets, including his own work (Waiting for Foucault, Still in 2002, The Western Illusion of Human Nature in 2008, Confucius Institutes in 2014, and What the Foucault? in 2018) and writing by fellow scholars and experts. Along with popular texts such as Donna Haraway's Companion Species Manifesto in 2003 and David Graeber's Fragments of an Anarchist Anthropology in 2004, Prickly Paradigm published works such as Richard Rorty's Against Bosses, Against Oligarchies in 2001, Bruno Latour's War of Worlds: What About Peace? in 2002, Deirdre McCloskey's The Secret Sins of Economics in 2002, James Elkins' What Happened to Art Criticism? in 2003, Grant Farred's Phantom Calls: Race and the Globalization of the NBA in 2006, Eduardo Viveiros de Castro's The Inconstancy of the Indian Soul: The Encounter of Catholics and Cannibals in Sixteenth-Century Brazil in 2011, and Philippe Descola's The Ecology of Others in 2013.

In 2004, Justin Shaffner scanned the original Prickly Pear pamphlets into a PDF format and made them freely available for distribution on the Internet.

During the 2000s, Prickly Paradigm published texts that addressed 9/11 and the War on Terror, such as 9/12 by Eliot Weinberger in 2003, Neomedievalism, Neoconservatism, and the War on Terror by Bruce Holsinger in 2007, and The Counter-Counterinsurgency Manual by the Network of Concerned Anthropologists in 2009.

Prickly Paradigm has also published collections of essays, such as Data, Now Bigger and Better in 2015, edited by Tom Boellstorff and Bill Maurer, and Making Kin Not Population: Reconceiving Generations in 2018, edited by Adele Clarke and Donna Haraway.

Prickly Paradigm and the Seminary Co-Op Bookstores founded Ode Books, an imprint devoted to book spaces and the book industry, in 2024. Ode Books' publications include "Reading the Room: A Booksellers Tale," about Paul Yamazaki, principal buyer for City Lights Bookstore.

In 2026, historian Peter Sahlins and philosopher Ramona Naddaff took over as executive publishers. They state that the Press will take a "historical turn," and use their digital platform to "enhance the printed word." They are now publishing critical commentary in the form of "Dispatches" on Substack.

== See also ==
- Anthropology
- List of anthropologists
- Small press
- List of small presses
- Pamphlets
