= Keith Hart =

Keith Hart may refer to:

- Keith Hart (anthropologist) (1943–2025), anthropology professor at Goldsmiths College, University of London
- Keith Hart (wrestler) (born 1951), Canadian retired firefighter and professional wrestler
