= Death of James Cook =

1779 killing in Kealakekua Bay, Hawaii

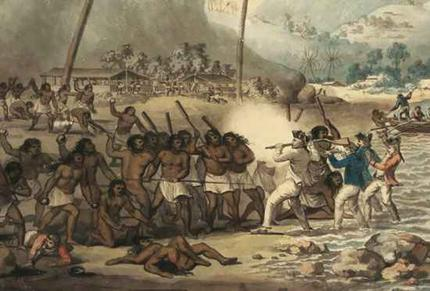
Death of Captain Cook (detail) by John Cleveley the Younger

On 14 February 1779 British explorer Captain James Cook was killed as he attempted to kidnap Kalaniʻōpuʻu, the ruling chief (aliʻi nui) of the island of Hawaii, and hold him hostage for the return of a cutter which Hawaiians had stolen. As Cook and his men attempted to take the chief to his ship, they were confronted by a crowd of Hawaiians at Kealakekua Bay seeking to prevent Kalaniʻōpuʻu leaving. In the ensuing confrontation, Cook, four British marines and 17 Hawaiians were killed.

In January 1778, during his third Pacific voyage, Cook had become the first known European to visit the Hawaiian Islands. His expedition returned to the islands in January 1779 and anchored in Kealakekua Bay. Relations between the British and Hawaiians were initially good, as Cook's expedition had arrived during the Makahiki season, a celebration of fertility and the god Lono. Although the Hawaiians called Cook "Lono" and treated him with reverence, scholars are divided on whether they considered him a deity.

Cook's expedition left the bay on 4 February but were forced to return a week later after one of its ships was damaged in a gale. However, the Makahiki season had ended and tensions between the British and Hawaiians increased. A series of thefts by Hawaiians and violent reprisals by the British culminated in the theft of the cutter and Cook's attempt to take Kalaniʻōpuʻu hostage for its return. After Cook was stabbed and beaten to death in the following affray, his body was dismembered by the Hawaiians and distributed to their chiefs – a mark of respect for a high-ranking adversary. Following reprisals by the British in which several more Hawaiians were killed, Cook's remains were returned to the British and were buried at sea with full military honours.

Following Cook's death, he was widely celebrated in Europe as a heroic explorer and humanitarian. However, some crew member accounts of his final voyage depicted him as hot-tempered and responsible for the mistreatment of indigenous people. For some decades after his death, many Hawaiians venerated him as an ancestral being, but as Christianity spread in Hawaii, his death was increasingly viewed as divine punishment.

== Arrival in Hawaiian islands ==
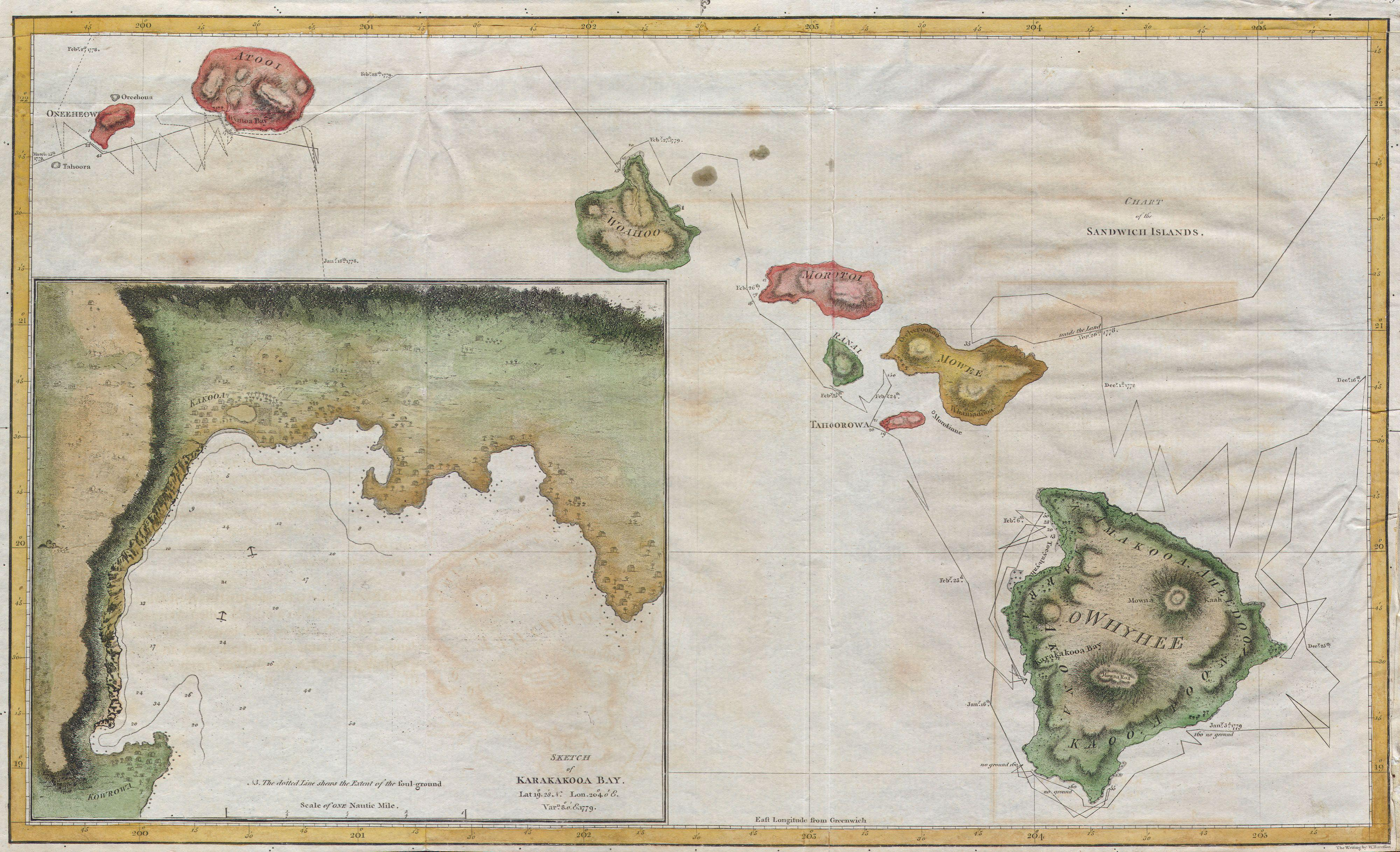
Map of Hawaiian islands and Kealakekua Bay (1785), attributed to William Bligh

=== First encounter ===
The British naval officer, James Cook, led three voyages of exploration to the Pacific and Southern Oceans, conducted between 1768 and 1779. During his third and final voyage, Cook commanded an expedition consisting of HMS Resolution, HMS Discovery and their crew. He and his crew became the first known Europeans to encounter the Hawaiian Islands when they sighted the island of Oahu on 18 January 1778. In the following days Cook landed on Kauai then Niʻihau.

=== Return to islands and landing at Kealakekua Bay, Hawaii ===
On 2 February Cook continued on to the coast of North America and Alaska, mapping and searching for a Northwest Passage to the Atlantic Ocean for approximately nine months. In November he returned to the island chain to resupply, initially exploring the coasts of Maui and Hawaii and trading with locals, then making anchor in Kealakekua Bay, Hawaii, on 17 January 1779. (Note: Kealakekua is a small bay on the western side of the island, measuring just over a mile (about 2 kilometres) from its northernmost to its southernmost points. It gives safe anchorage and, at the time, was the most populous region of the island and intensely cultivated. There were four villages along the bay. The chiefs' main settlement of Kaʻawaloa in the north and the priests' main settlement at Hikiau in the south were almost a mile (about 1.4 kilometres) apart.)

News of the strange visitors had spread throughout the islands, and Cook and his crew were initially welcomed with great excitement, a crowd of about 10,000 gathering on the shore or rowing to the ships in canoes. The arrival of the British coincided with the Makahiki season, a New Year festival in honour of the god Lono of the Hawaiian religion, and a celebration of fertility and the yearly harvest. Cook was led ashore by a Hawaiian chief and a priest who conducted him to the Lono shrine (heiau) of Hikeau, at the southern end of the bay, where the priests had their main settlement. A crowd repeatedly shouted "Lono" and prostrated themselves as the procession passed. Priests led Cook through an elaborate ceremony at the shrine before he was conducted back to his ship.

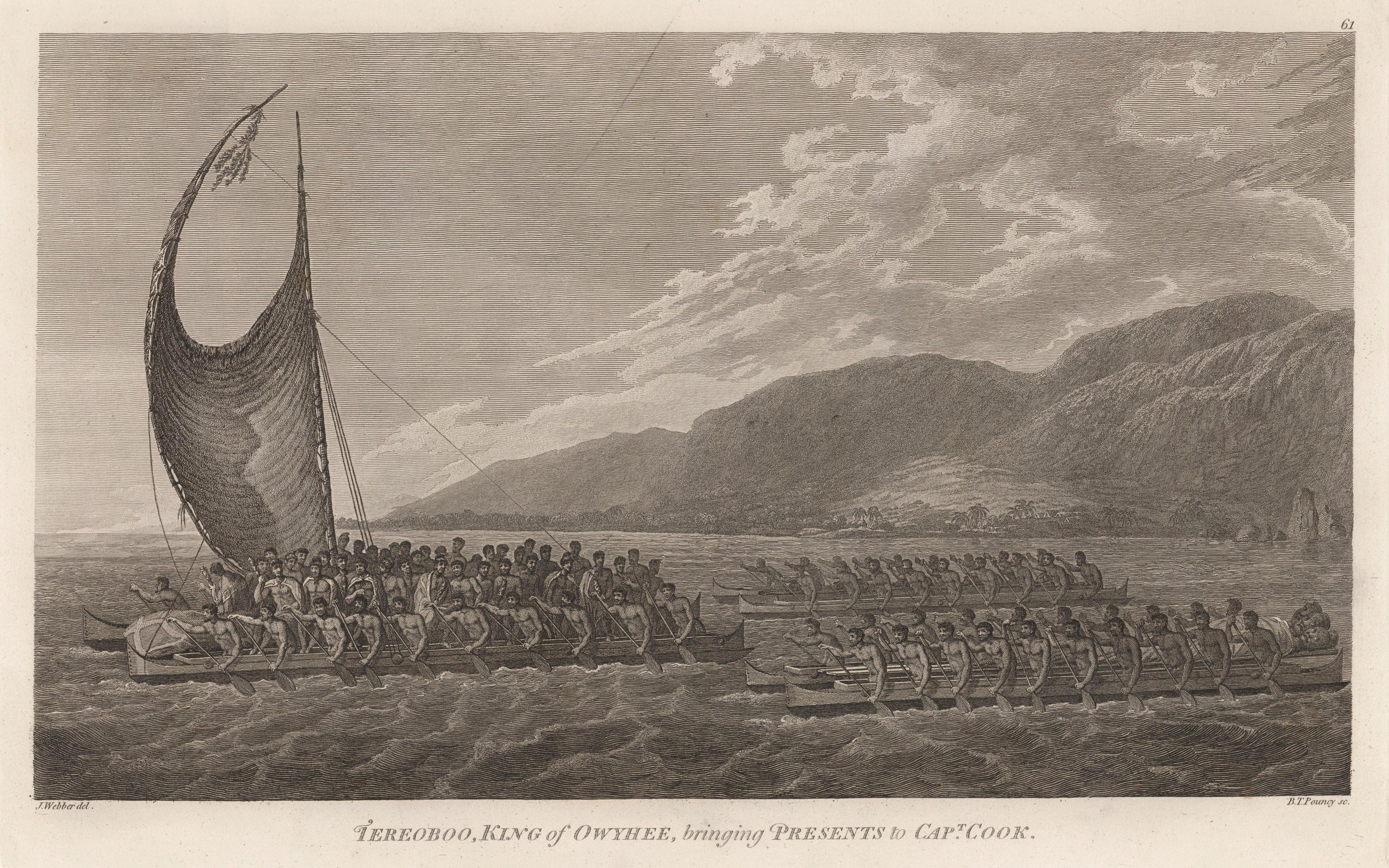
Kalaniʻōpuʻu bringing presents to Cook, by John Webber, artist aboard Cook's ship

On 25 January the high chief (aliʻi nui) of the island, Kalaniʻōpuʻu, met Cook near the shrine where they conducted a ceremonial exchange of names and the symbols of their authority. Both Cook and Kalaniʻōpuʻu were referred to as Lono, and Hawaiians prostrated themselves when they passed. (Note: The establishment of ceremonial friendships typically involved Cook and a chief exchanging genealogies, names, and symbols of their status (for example, uniforms and weapons), by which their ancestries and mana (life force) would be merged.) The anthropologists Gananath Obeyesekere and Marshall Sahlins have debated whether Hawaiians considered Cook to be the god Lono. Anthropologist Anne Salmond has argued that high chiefs were considered to be akua, descended from divine beings, and that both Cook and Kalaniʻōpuʻu were considered descendants of Lono. (Note: The academic Nicholas Thomas, however, states that the Hawaiians considered Cook an incarnation of Lono, and Kalaniʻōpuʻu an incarnation of the war god Kū.)

While Cook and many of his crew had some knowledge of Polynesian languages and cultures, they were unaware of the significance of these ceremonies and rituals. Nevertheless, relations between the British and Hawaiians were initially good. The priests based in the settlement of Hikiau permitted the British to set up an observatory and camp near the shrine. Trade with the ships flourished, the Hawaiians particularly valuing iron goods. The British reported fewer thefts and tensions than had been the case in the other Pacific islands.

Tensions increased, however, when the Makahiki season ended and the season of the war-god Kū began. A Hawaiian was flogged for theft and some of the British beat Hawaiians for trivial reasons. When the British needed firewood, the priests allowed them to buy the wooden fence surrounding the shrine. Some sailors also took carved images from the shrine and the priests asked for the return of the main image. Sources are divided on the extent to which the incident offended the Hawaiians. Soon after, the priests allowed the British to bury a recently deceased sailor on the grounds of the shrine.

In early February Kalaniʻōpuʻu and the priests anxiously asked Cook when he was going to leave. After a final round of ceremonial exchanges of gifts, and celebrations involving boxing, wrestling and a fireworks display, Cook's expedition sailed out of Kealakekua Bay on 4 February.

== Conflict and death ==
=== Return to Kealakekua Bay ===
The expedition soon encountered a hard gale which wrenched the mainmast of the Resolution. On 11 February they returned to Kealakekua Bay to make repairs. Marine Corporal John Ledyard later wrote:

Our return to this bay was as disagreeable to us as it was to the inhabitants, for we were reciprocally tired of each other. They had been oppressed and were weary of our prostituted alliance...It was also equally evident from the looks of the natives as well as every other appearance that our friendship was now at an end, and that we had nothing to do but to hasten our departure to some different island where our vices were not known, and where our intrinsic virtues might gain us another short space of being wondered at.

The return of Cook (representing Lono) during the season of Kū was contrary to Hawaiian beliefs and caused tension between the priests of Lono and the chiefs who were associated with Kū. This time there were no welcoming crowds as the priests had placed a taboo (kapu) on the bay. The priests, however, gave the British permission to again set up a camp near the shrine so the Resolution's mast could be repaired. Kalaniʻōpuʻu questioned Cook about his return and was displeased with his answers. He was also displeased with the priests for allowing the British to set up a camp on the shore. Nevertheless, he lifted the kapu on the bay, and trade with the ships resumed.

The British soon noticed an increase in thefts and a more defiant attitude from the Hawaiians. A Hawaiian chief took the armourer's tongs from the Discovery and was punished with 40 lashes. The tongs were taken again but were returned the same day. When a British landing party tried to take a Hawaiian canoe in retaliation, a dispute followed in which a prominent chief named Palea was hit with an oar, and an angry crowd of about 300 Hawaiians responded by hurling stones and beating the landing party. On the same day a party gathering water for the ships was dispersed by Hawaiians, and a marine was pelted with stones. Following these disturbances Cook ordered his marines to load their muskets with ball rather than small shot, and ordered all Hawaiians off the ships. (Note: Ball was more lethal than small shot.)

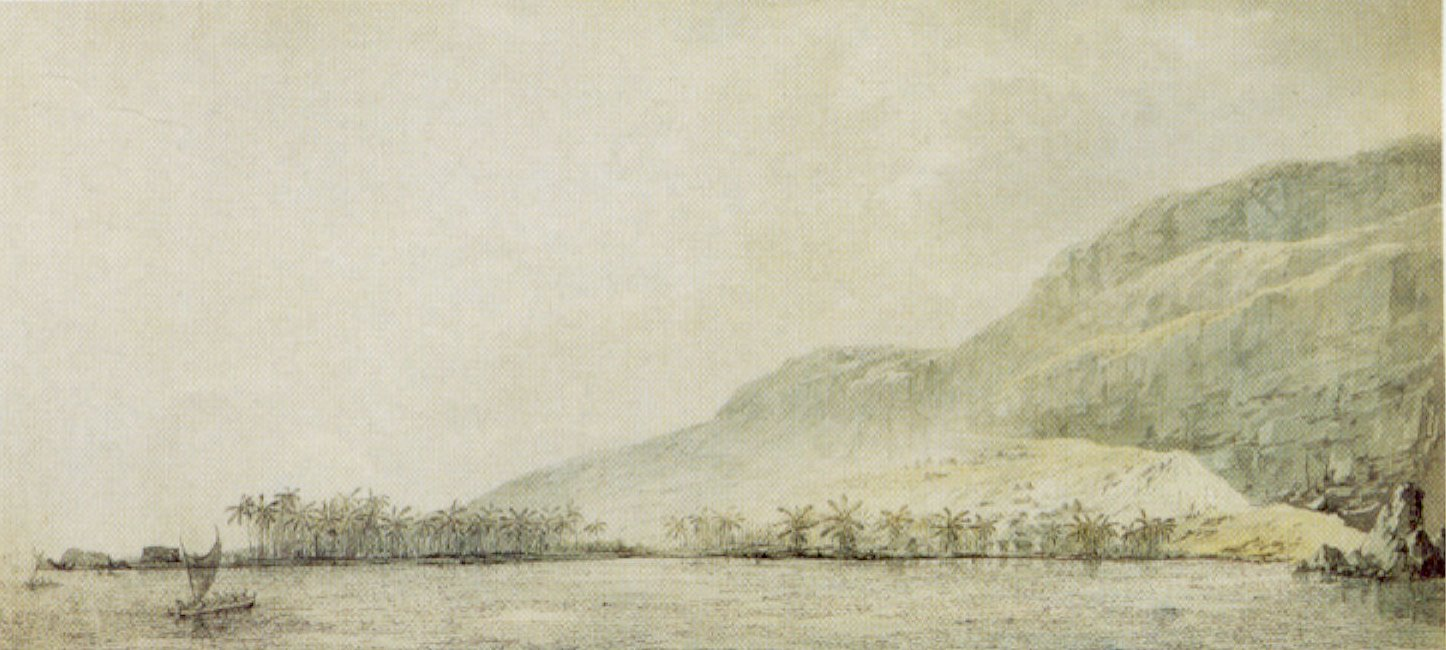
Kaʻawaloa in 1779 by John Webber

=== Attempt to take Kalaniʻōpuʻu hostage ===
On the morning of 14 February Cook heard that the Discovery's large cutter had been stolen. He ordered boats to be stationed at both ends of the bay to capture any canoes attempting to leave. He then set off in the Resolution's pinnace to the chiefs' settlement of Kaʻawaloa, at the northern end of the bay, where he intended to take Kalaniʻōpuʻu hostage until the cutter was returned. Cook had previously held Tongan and Tahitian high chiefs hostage for the return of stolen items and this had almost led to violence because Polynesians considered their high chiefs sacred.

Cook landed at the beach near Kaʻawaloa, accompanied by 10 marines. The Resolution's launch and cutter remained just offshore to enforce the blockade. Two young sons of Kalaniʻōpuʻu led Cook's party to their father who had been sleeping. Cook spoke to Kalaniʻōpuʻu and was convinced that he knew nothing about the theft of the cutter. When Cook asked him to go with him to the Resolution he agreed, and his two young sons ran ahead to the boat. However, as Cook and Kalaniʻōpuʻu were walking hand in hand to the boat, one of Kalaniʻōpuʻu 's wives, Kānekapōlei, pleaded with him not to go. She was joined by two chiefs who sat Kalaniʻōpuʻu down. A man began chanting and made an offering of a coconut to Cook and Kalaniʻōpuʻu. A crowd of 2,000 to 3,000 Hawaiians had gathered and some began to don their protective war mats and to arm themselves with spears, daggers and stones. Cook ordered the marines to form a line along the rocks near the shore and told the Lieutenant of Marines, Molesworth Phillips, "We can never think of compelling him [Kalaniʻōpuʻu] to go on board without killing a number of people."

=== Affray on beach and Cook's death ===
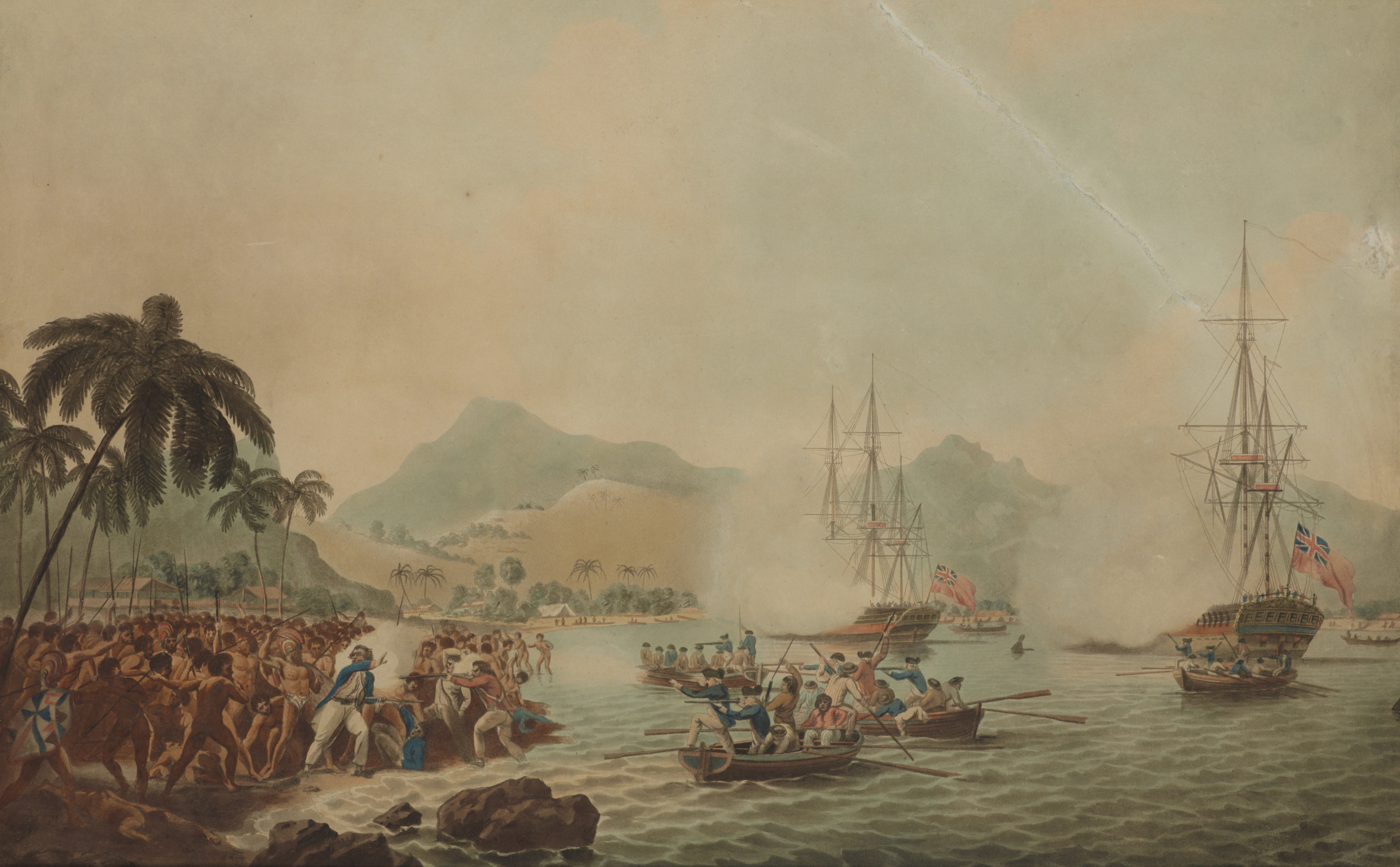
Death of Captain Cook by John Cleveley the Younger, Aquatint by Francis Jukes

Accounts differ over the confused events that followed, (Note: Williams notes that eyewitness accounts of the fracas differed and discusses such inconsistencies as whether the marines or the crew of the boats fired first, and whether Cook was clubbed before being stabbed.) but at some point the Hawaiians learned that a chief named Kalimu had been shot on the other side of the bay, which further angered the crowd. When a warrior threatened Cook with a dagger and a stone, Cook fired small shot at him, but it had little effect because the warrior was wearing his war mat. (Note: Cook was armed with a double-barrelled musket. He had loaded one barrel with small shot and the other with ball.) The crowd began throwing stones, knocking down a marine. Phillips was attacked with a dagger, but fended off his assailant with the butt of his musket, after which Cook fired ball at a Hawaiian, killing him. One of Kalaniʻōpuʻu's sons was already in the pinnace, but returned to shore when the firing started. The Hawaiians launched a general attack, and the marines and boat crews opened fire. (Note: Crew member accounts disagree about whether the marines and boat crews opened fire on Cook's orders.)

The marines fired one round, but did not have time to reload before the warriors overwhelmed them. Cook ordered the marines to take to the boats then turned to signal the boats to move closer to shore. It is unclear, however, whether he was also ordering them to cease fire. (Note: The official account of the voyage stated that Cook signalled the boats to cease firing, and to pull in. Beaglehole, however, writes, "There is no justification for the statement commonly made that that he [Cook] was waving to the boats to stop firing." Salmond, in contrast, writes, "When Cook waved to the boats, which were a few yards offshore, to stop firing and come in and assist them, Lieutenant Williamson ... said later that he mistook this for a command to retreat.") During the evacuation to the boats, Cook was clubbed on the back of the head and stabbed. He was then surrounded by Hawaiians who beat and stabbed him to death. (Note: Some crew member accounts state that Cook was first stabbed. However, Richard Hough, in his biography of Cook, considers the account of ship surgeon David Samwell the most comprehensive. Samwell was not on the shore at the time of the confrontation but questioned those who were. His journal reads: "Captain Cook was now the only man on the rock, he was seen walking down towards the pinnace, holding his left hand against the back of his head to guard it from stones and carrying his musket under the other arm. An Indian came running behind him, stopping once or twice as he advanced, as if he was afraid that he should turn around and then, taking him unaware, he sprung at him, knocked him on the back of the head with a large club and instantly fled with the greatest precipitation. The blow made Captain Cook stagger two or three paces. He then fell on his hand and one knee and dropped his musket. As he was rising, another Indian came running to him and before he could recover himself from the fall drew out an iron dagger he concealed under his feathered cloak and stuck it with all his force into the back of his neck, which made Captain Cook tumble into the water.") (Note: Numerous Hawaiians are reported to have been Cook's killers. Samwell states that a chief named Karimanocoaha first struck Cook with the club and another chief, Nooha (Nuʻa), first stabbed him. The academic Glyn Williams states that others identified as Cook's killer include: the chief Palea; a minor chief named "Typowooah"; a man named Pihere; an old chief who was immediately shot; "a carpenter"; and "a commoner from another part of the island".)

Phillips and four other marines made it to the pinnace and the cutter, which pulled away. The launch had already pulled away after the firing had started, its commander, Lieutenant John Williamson, misinterpreting Cook's signal. The Resolution opened fire with cannon, and most of the Hawaiians retreated. Four marines were also killed in the affray, and the British left the five bodies onshore. (Note: The four marines killed in the confrontation were: Corporal James Thomas, Private Theophilus Hinks, Private Thomas Fatchett and Private John Allen.) Seventeen Hawaiians were killed at Kaʻawaloa, and another eight were killed elsewhere around the bay on the same day.

=== Burial at sea and completion of expedition ===
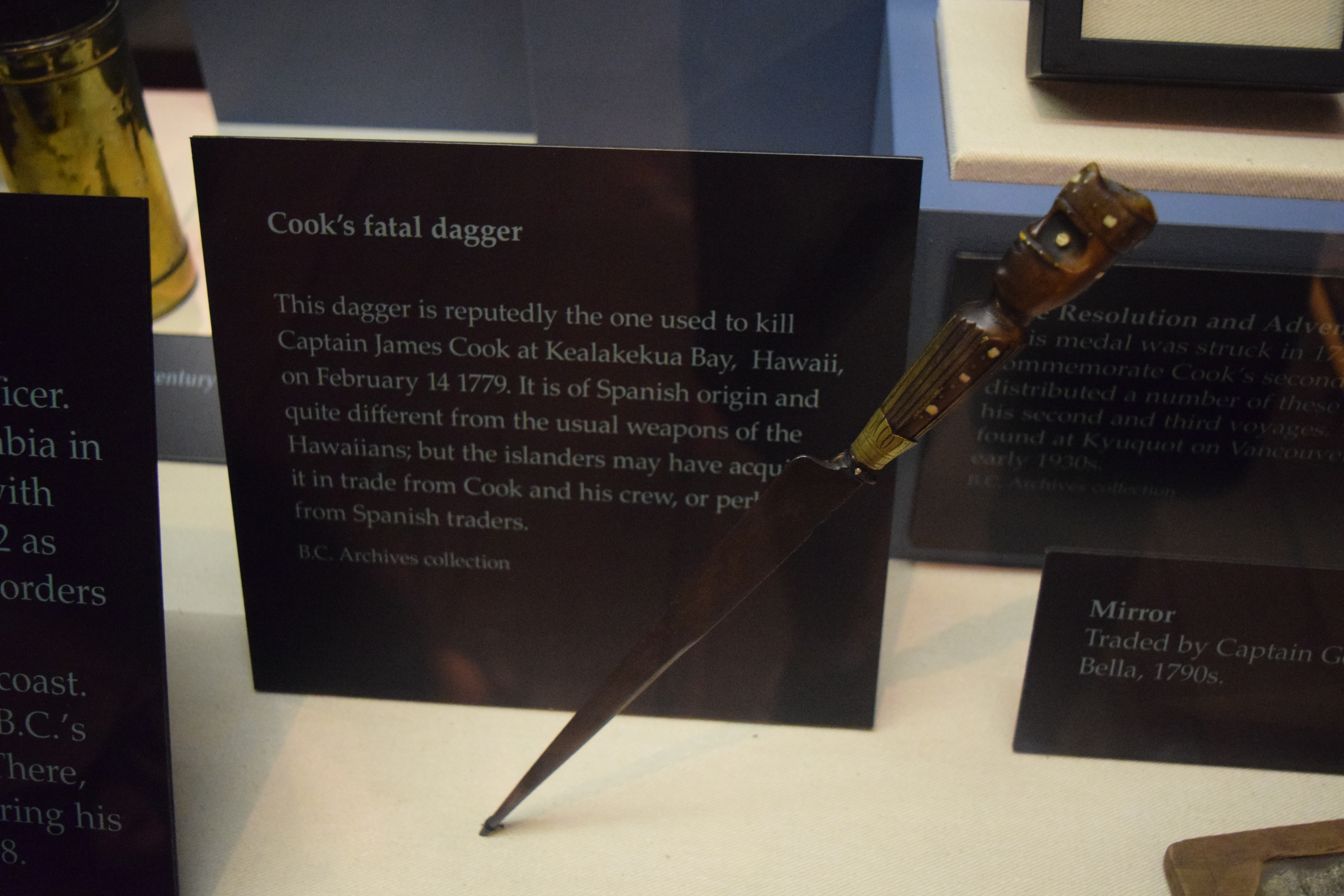
The dagger purportedly used to stab Cook, on display at the Royal British Columbia Museum in Victoria, Canada

When news of Cook's death reached the ships, crew members reacted with shock and a desire for revenge. However, Captain Charles Clerke, now the senior officer, persuaded the crew that the priorities were to secure the return of the mast that was undergoing repairs onshore and the bodies of Cook and the dead marines. Following skirmishes with Hawaiians around the British camp, a truce was reached and the British brought the Resolution's foremast back to the ship.

Recriminations over Cook's death followed. Phillips and some of the crew of the boats accused Williamson of abandoning Cook, and William Bligh accused the marines of ill-discipline. Several crew members believed Cook provoked the conflict by his decision to kidnap Kalaniʻōpuʻu and by opening fire on the Hawaiians rather than retreating to the boats when he had the opportunity. Others considered that Cook should have fired ball, rather than small shot, at the first sign of violent resistance from the Hawaiians. Several suggested that the news of the shooting of a chief on the other side of the bay sparked the violence. Clerke assumed leadership of the expedition and launched an inquiry into Williamson's conduct, after which he promoted him to Second Lieutenant.

The bodies of Cook and the marines were taken by the Hawaiians to their chiefs. Cook's body was dismembered, partly burnt, and distributed to the chiefs, which was an honour given to enemies of high rank. Lieutenant James King took a boat to the opposite side of the bay, and was approached by a priest who offered to intercede and ask for Cook's remains to be returned. King consented. The following evening two priests secretly returned a part of Cook's thigh to the British. Some crewmen returned to the shore two days later to collect water, and skirmishes broke out. The British then burned down the priests' settlement at Hikiau and killed five or six Hawaiians. Three days later more of Cook's remains were returned to the Resolution, including his legs, arms, skull, some charred flesh, and the hands with the skin still attached. The crew buried his remains at sea.

The British officers were puzzled by the reaction of the Hawaiians to Cook's death. Some lamented Cook and had sworn to recover his remains, while others taunted the British. Hawaiians repeatedly asked the officers when Lono would return and whether he would punish them. Although King was told that Kalaniʻōpuʻu had retired to a secluded cave, it is unclear whether he was mourning the loss of Cook, with whom he had exchanged names, or the dead Hawaiians.

The ships left the bay on 23 February 1779, and spent five weeks charting the coasts of the islands – in accordance with a plan set out by Cook before his death. They travelled through the archipelago, stopping at Lanai, Molokai, Oahu and Kauai. They then sailed north to again try to locate the Northwest Passage. Clerke stopped in Kamchatka and entrusted Cook's journal and a covering letter describing Cook's death to the local military commander, Magnus von Behm. Behm had the package delivered, overland, from Siberia to England. The Admiralty, and all of England, learned of Cook's death when the package arrived in London – eleven months after he died. The package had arrived in England before the surviving crew.

== Aftermath ==
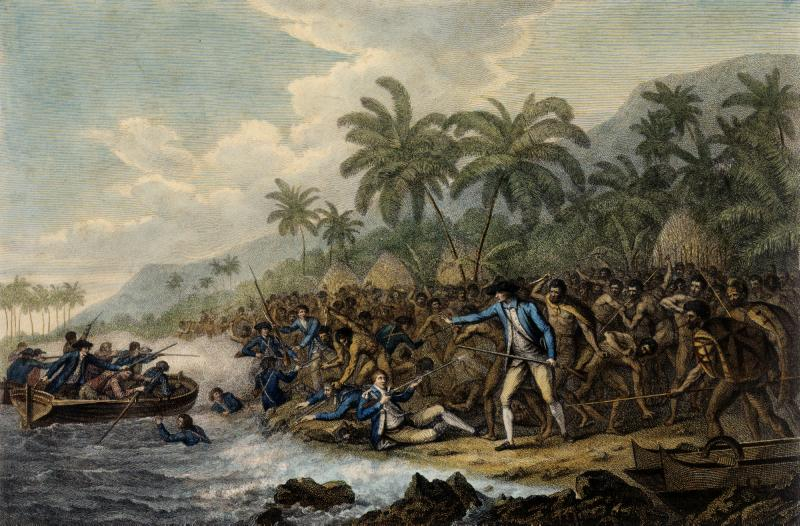
Death of Captain Cook by John Webber

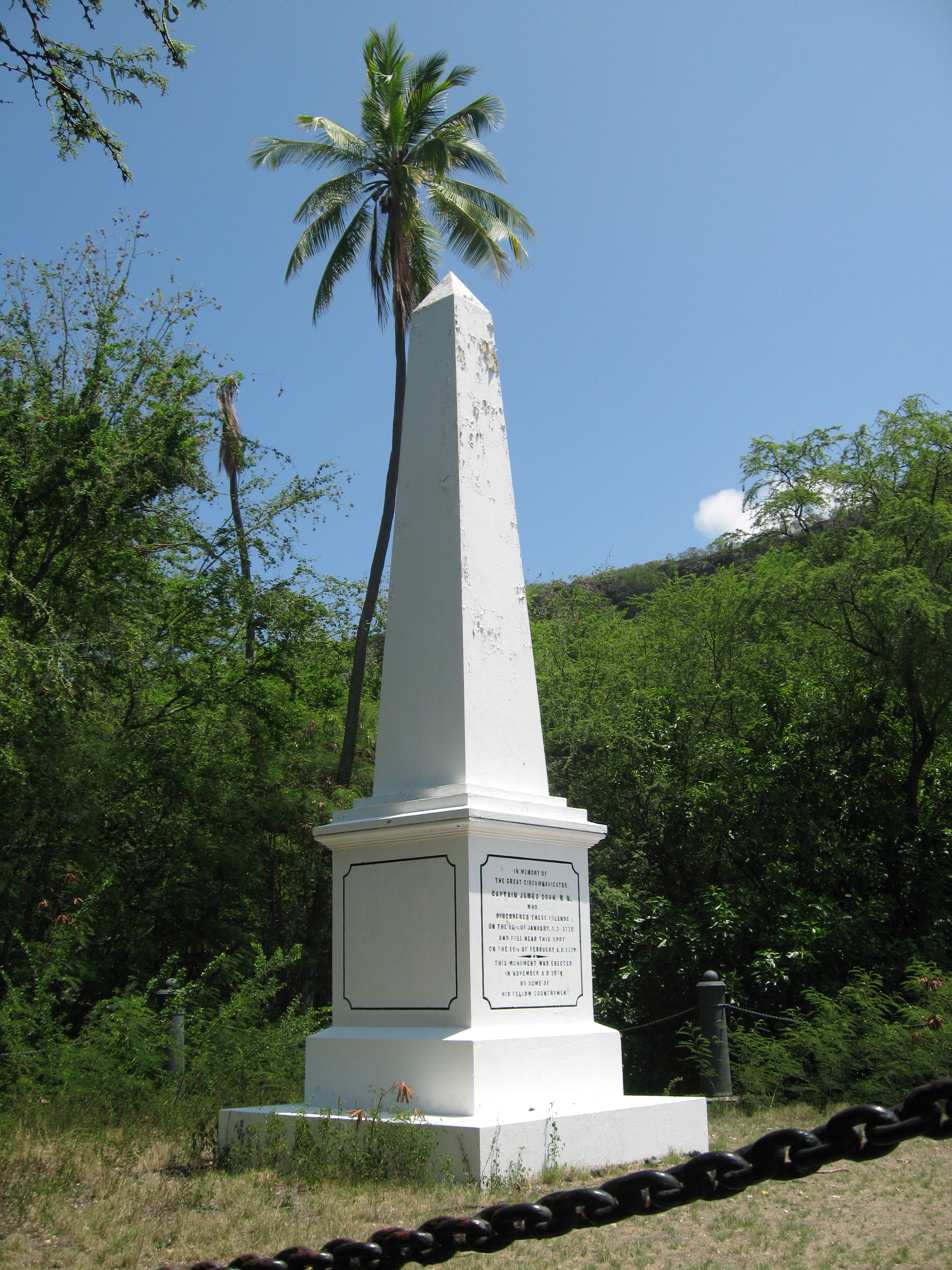
Cook memorial, Kealakekua Bay

When news of Cook's death reached Britain and continental Europe, obituaries, poems and tributes emphasised his humble birth, technical skills, leadership qualities, contributions to science and trade, and his concern for the well-being of his crew and indigenous people. King George III reportedly wept at the news and awarded Cook's widow, Elizabeth, a pension of £200 a year.

There were many artistic representations of Cook's death. John Webber's influential painting, The Death of Captain Cook (1781–1783), depicted a heroic Cook ordering the boats to stop firing on the Hawaiians. Reproductions of the painting labelled Cook "a victim of his own humanity."

The description of Cook's death in the official account of the expedition, published in 1784, suggested that he might not have ordered the marines and boats to fire on the Hawaiians, and might have been stabbed in the back while gesturing to the boats to stop firing. The view that Cook was the victim of his own humanity became the official interpretation of his death. The 1785 English pantomime Omai, or A Trip Around the World, which featured an elaborate staging of Cook's death as a heroic apotheosis, was seen by tens of thousands of people. Other theatrical performances of Cook's death were staged in France and England in 1788 and 1789.

Some unofficial accounts of Cook's death by crewmen challenged the heroic interpretation. In May 1781, a Journal of Captain Cook's Last Voyage, probably by Lieutenant John Rickman, depicted Cook as inflicting violent and excessive punishments on crew and indigenous people. Heinrich Zimmermann's account of the same year portrayed Cook as hot tempered. Ledyard's A Journal Of Captain Cook's Last Voyage (1783) also depicted Cook as subject to rages and as an exploiter of the Hawaiians. Along with the official account, these narratives suggested that the Hawaiians treated Cook like a god. The poets William Cowper and Johann Wolfgang von Goethe, after reading some of these accounts, suggested that in allowing himself to be worshipped as a god, Cook had incurred divine punishment.

British visitors to Hawaii from the 1780s reported that Hawaiians regretted killing Cook and that he was regarded as a Lono-nui, or ancestral being, who would come again and forgive them. In 1823 the missionary William Ellis reported that Cook's bones were still held in a shrine and used in ceremonies. However, by the 1830s, the influence of Protestant missionaries had led to a view, particularly among young Hawaiians, that God had killed Cook because he had spread venereal disease and allowed himself to be worshipped. (Note: Although members of Cook's expedition did spread sexually transmitted diseases to Hawaii, Cook tried to prevent this and it is unlikely that he had sex with Hawaiians.)

In 1825 the crew of a visiting British ship set up a memorial to Cook at the site of his death. In 1877 a memorial obelisk was erected at Kealakekua Bay.

== See also ==
- History of Hawaii

== Sources ==
- Ashley, Scott (February 2007). "How Navigators Think: The Death of Captain Cook Revisited". Past and Present. 194 (1) – via JSTOR.
- Beaglehole, John (1974). The Life of Captain James Cook. London: A. and C. Black Ltd. ISBN 0713613823.
- Hough, Richard (1997). Captain James Cook: a biography. New York: Norton. ISBN 9780393315196.
- Joppien, Rüdiger; Smith, Bernard (1987). The Art of Captain Cook's Voyages. Vol. 3: The Voyage of the Resolution and Discovery 1776-1780, Catalogue. South Melbourne: Oxford University Press. ISBN 0195548639.
- Ledyard, John (1963) [1783]. Munford, James (ed.). John Ledyard's Journal of Captain Cook's Last Voyage. Corvallis: Oregon State University Press.
- Obeyesekere, Gananath (1997). The Apotheosis of Captain Cook: European Mythmaking in the Pacific. Princeton University Press. ISBN 9780691056807.
- Robson, John (2004). "Kalaniopuʻu". In Robson, John (ed.). The Captain Cook Encyclopaedia. Sydney: Random House. ISBN 0759310114.
- Ryan, Tom (2004). "Cook as god and Cook's death". In Robson, John (ed.). The Captain Cook Encyclopaedia. Sydney: Random House. ISBN 0759310114.
- Sahlins, Marshall (1996). How "Natives" Think: About Captain Cook, For Example. University of Chicago press. ISBN 9780226733692.
- Salmond, Anne (2004). The Trial of the Cannibal Dog: Captain Cook in the South Seas. London: Penguin Books. ISBN 0141010037.
- Samwell, David (1893) [1779]. "An Account of Cook's Death (Some Account of a Voyage to South Seas in 1776, 1777, 1778 Written by David Samwell, Surgeon of the Discover)". In Bladen, Frank (ed.). Historical Records of New South Wales: pt.1. Cook, 1762-1780. Sydney: C. Potter, Government Printer. pp. 450–478.
- Thomas, Nicholas (2003). Discoveries: The Voyages of Captain Cook. London: Allen Lane. ISBN 0713995572.
- Williams, Glyndwr (2008). The Death of Captain Cook: A Hero Made and Unmade. Cambridge, MA: Harvard University Press. ISBN 9780674031944.
- Withey, Lynne (January 1989). Voyages of Discovery: Captain Cook and the Exploration of the Pacific. Berkeley and Los Angeles: University of California Press. ISBN 9780520065642.
