= Zimbabwe Football Association =

Governing body of association football in Zimbabwe

CAF
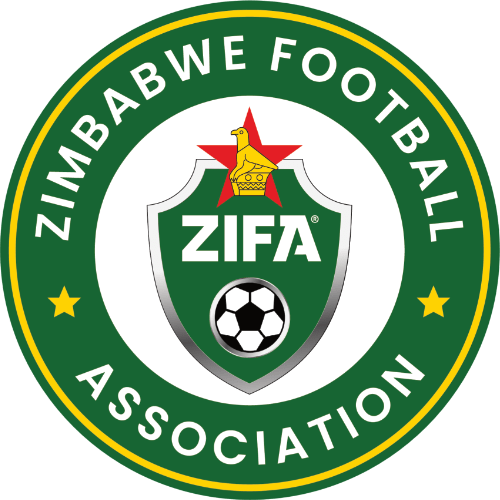
- Short name: ZIFA
- Founded: 1892 (Southern Rhodesia); 1965 (Rhodesia); 1979 (Zimbabwe)
- Headquarters: Harare
- FIFA affiliation: 1965
- CAF affiliation: 1980
- COSAFA affiliation: 1997
- President: Nqobile Magwizi
- Website: www.zifa.org.zw

The Zimbabwe Football Association (ZIFA) is the governing body of football in Zimbabwe. It is responsible for organising national football competitions in Zimbabwe and managing the Zimbabwe national football teams.

The current ZIFA was founded in 1979. It has been affiliated with FIFA since 1965 and has been a member of the CAF since 1980.

In October 2015, Zimbabwe Football Association President, Cuthbert Dube, stepped down after five years in charge. During his tenure, the organisation's debt rose to $6 million and national teams struggled repeatedly to fulfil away assignments due to lack of funds. Dube faced a vote of no confidence at a meeting prior to his resignation.

== 2025 to present ==
In January 2025, businessman Nqobile Magwizi was elected president of the Zimbabwe Football Association, winning a landslide victory that ended three years of FIFA normalisation committee administration. In March 2025 he was officially welcomed by FIFA president Gianni Infantino during a meeting in Cairo, where the two discussed Magwizi's priorities of uniting Zimbabweans through football, improving governance and modernising the domestic game, with FIFA highlighting its support through the FIFA Forward programme and other development initiatives. ZIFA subsequently published a 100‑day progress report under Magwizi which emphasised restructuring, governance reforms, youth development and infrastructure as early priorities of the new administration.

As part of its competition reforms ZIFA announced the revival of a national knockout competition, rebranded as the ZIFA Cup, scheduled to return in 2025 after more than two decades of dormancy. The association said the ZIFA Cup would be fully funded by the FA and open to clubs from the lower divisions up to the Premier Soccer League, reviving a domestic FA Cup‑style competition intended to widen participation and talent identification. In early 2026 President Emmerson Mnangagwa formally launched the ZIFA Munhumutapa Challenge Cup, a separate national knockout tournament for men's and women's teams drawn from the Premier Soccer League, lower divisions and Area Zone leagues. The Munhumutapa Challenge Cup carries sponsorship of about US$5 million per season over five years (US$25 million in total) and has been described as one of the largest single financial injections into Zimbabwean football, with more than 1,000 teams and over 700 matches expected nationwide and the winners earning a place in the CAF Confederation Cup.

In November 2025 ZIFA publicly blocked a Premier Soccer League resolution to suspend relegation for the 2025 Castle Lager Premier Soccer League campaign and temporarily expand the top flight to 22 teams in 2026, ruling that the proposal was invalid under the association's statutes. In its statement the association said that promotion and relegation "cannot be suspended" and are fundamental to the integrity, fairness and sporting merit of the league system, and confirmed that four clubs would be relegated at the end of the 2025 season under the traditional rules.

Following the lifting of Zimbabwe's international suspension, the men's national team returned to a full schedule in 2025, playing 2026 FIFA World Cup qualification matches, COSAFA Cup fixtures and the 2025 Africa Cup of Nations in Morocco. Match records list fixtures against opponents including Benin, Nigeria, South Africa, Egypt and Angola across World Cup qualifying, regional competition and AFCON group‑stage games. ZIFA has also continued to emphasise governance reforms, youth development and infrastructure upgrades in its public communications, including through its 100‑day report and coverage of joint activities with FIFA, CAF and COSAFA officials.

In parallel with these developments, the 2025 ZIFA presidential election and Magwizi's rise to the presidency attracted controversy over the role of businessman Wicknell Chivayo. In the build‑up to the poll Chivayo faced criticism for allegedly attempting to influence the election by publicly promising vehicles and financial incentives, including a US$200,000 Toyota Land Cruiser for his preferred candidate Magwizi, brand‑new cars for ZIFA councillors and a multi‑million‑dollar sponsorship package conditional on Magwizi's victory. Critics argued that these pledges amounted to vote‑buying under the FIFA Code of Ethics. Chivayo denied the allegations, insisting that his support for ZIFA under Magwizi's leadership did not constitute vote‑buying and emphasising that, as a private businessman, he was not bound by the FIFA Code of Ethics.

In January 2025, following Magwizi's election as ZIFA president, Chivayo announced that a Toyota Land Cruiser 300 Series valued at about R3.2 million (approximately US$200,000) had been purchased for the new ZIFA head and promoted it as a personal gift. In a later ZIFA Media interview and statement, Magwizi said that although the Land Cruiser had been offered to him, he declined to take personal ownership of the vehicle after consulting governance advisers, citing the FIFA Code of Ethics and the need to avoid a conflict of interest arising from accepting a high‑value gift from a football benefactor.

In February 2026, Chivayo stated that he had bought a 2026 Range Rover Sport D350 Autobiography Limited Edition worth about R4 million (approximately US$250,000) for Magwizi and invited him to collect it from a Harare dealership, praising him for what he described as restoring structure and transparency at ZIFA and for ensuring that the national team was fully funded and adequately catered for during the 2025 Africa Cup of Nations campaign, which he called a "rare occurrence" in Zimbabwean football. Further commentary on the saga highlighted that Magwizi had declined to take personal ownership of any of the vehicles offered by Chivayo, with the businessman later acknowledging that the ZIFA president had refused his car gift and citing Magwizi's insistence on complying with the FIFA Code of Ethics and avoiding potential conflicts of interest. Subsequent reports, citing the FIFA Code of Ethics, noted that accepting such a high‑value personal gift from a football benefactor could breach regulations on gifts to officials and that Magwizi was unlikely to take the vehicle. In a later ZIFA statement and interview, Magwizi said that he had also declined the Range Rover offer and reiterated that he had never accepted any vehicle, monetary gift or other personal benefit from Chivayo or any individual connected to ZIFA affairs, stressing that his leadership had to comply with FIFA and CAF governance and ethics rules.

== ZIFA regions ==
ZIFA has four Regions made up of ten Provinces:

- ZIFA Central Region (Provinces: Matebeleland South, Midlands)
- ZIFA Eastern Region (Provinces: Manicaland, Masvingo, Mashonaland East)
- ZIFA Northern Region (Provinces: Harare, Mashonaland Central, Mashonaland West)
- ZIFA Southern Region (Provinces: Bulawayo, Matebeleland North)

== Unauthorised matches allegation ==
In October 2010, Henrietta Rushwaya, the Chief Executive of the ZIFA, was sacked after being found guilty by the Association's disciplinary body on charges of "conduct inconsistent with her duties, mismanagement and insubordination".

Rushwaya was found guilty of sending the national team to play unauthorised matches in Asia in 2009. Her sacking followed her suspension in July 2010 on suspicion of fixing matches in a Malaysian tournament. She was also found guilty of requesting a loan of $103,000 from Zimbabwe's sports commission, an amount that is now unaccounted for.

The national team's matches against Thailand, Syria and a Malaysian club were accepted without the permission of ZIFA's Board or Zimbabwe's Sports Commission, which must authorise foreign trips taken by Zimbabwe teams. Rushwaya also allowed the former Zimbabwe champions Monomotapa to go to Malaysia in 2009 masquerading as the national team of Zimbabwe.

Both tours are suspected of being set up by betting syndicates, a report by the Forum for African Investigative Reporters stated in September 2010.

Rushwaya was acquitted after a fully contested trial and also due to lack of incriminating evidence. Some theorists allege that her prosecution was a conspiracy linked to ZIFA President Cuthbert Dube.
