= Martha Kaplan =

American anthropologist

Martha Kaplan is a cultural anthropologist who has written a number of articles and books from her research conducted in Fiji, India, and Singapore. Dr. Kaplan is currently a professor of anthropology at Vassar College in New York.

== Personal and professional life ==
Martha Kaplan was born in 1957. Ms. Kaplan earned her AB (better known as B.A. or Bachelor of Arts degree) from Bryn Mawr College in 1979, where she graduated magna cum laude. She went on to the University of Chicago where, as a student of Marshall Sahlins, she earned her Master of Arts degree in 1981 and PhD in 1988.

After beginning her career at NYU, Martha Kaplan moved to Vassar College in 1990, where she is currently Professor of Anthropology and member of the Asian Studies department steering committee. She specializes in the study of ritual, globalization, colonial and post-colonial societies, and the anthropology of water. She has pursued research in Fiji, Singapore, and India. Martha Kaplan has taught courses including “Introduction to Cultural Anthropology”, “Anthropological Approaches to Myth, Ritual and Symbol” and “Imagining Asia”.

She has carried out much of her research with her husband John D. Kelly, a Professor of Anthropology at the University of Chicago. They have co-authored books and articles, most significantly a critique of Benedict Anderson's Imagined Communities thesis entitled Represented Communities: Fiji and World Decolonization (2001). They have both done research in Fiji and India and used their research as the basis for their books. Martha Kaplan is also the author of Neither Cargo nor Cult: Ritual Politics and the Colonial Imagination in Fiji.

Her research has been supported by Fulbright, National Science Foundation, Charlotte Newcombe Foundation, American Institute of Indian Studies and the Wenner Gren Foundation for Anthropological Research.

Martha and John reside in Poughkeepsie, NY, with their two children.

== Selected publications ==
- 2005 Outside Gods and Foreign Powers: Making Local History with Global Means in the Pacific. Ethnohistory special issue 52:1(2005). Contents: Preface by Marshall Sahlins, Introduction by Martha Kaplan; Original papers by John D Kelly, Andrew Lattas, Deborah McDougall, Martha Kaplan, Daniel Rosenblatt, and Margaret Jolly, with Comments by Robert J. Foster and Emiko Ohnuki-Tierney.
- 2005 "The Hau of Other Peoples' Gifts" Ethnohistory 52:1(2005)
- 2004 "Neither Traditional Nor Foreign: Dialogics of protest and agency in Fijian History" In Holger Jebens, Ton Otto, Karl Heinz Kohl eds. Cargo Cult and Culture Critique. Honolulu: University of Hawaii Press pp 59–79.
- 2004 "Promised Lands: From Colonial Law-giving to Postcolonial Takeovers in Fiji" In Sally Engle Merry and Don Brenneis, eds. Law and Empire in the Pacific: Fiji and Hawaii. Santa Fe: School of American Research pp 153–186.
- 2004 "Fiji's Coups: The Politics of Representation and the Representation of Politics:" in Victoria Lockwood, ed. Pacific Islands Societies in a Global World. NJ: Pearson Prentice Hall pp. 72–85
- 2001 (co-authored with John D. Kelly) Represented Communities: Fiji and World Decolonization 1st ed., University Of Chicago Press.
- 1999 "On Discourse and Power: Cults and Orientals in Fiji". American Ethnologist. 26(4): 843–63.
- 1995. Neither Cargo nor Cult: Ritual Politics and the Colonial Imagination in Fiji, Duke University Press Books.
- 1990 (co-authored with John D. Kelly) "History, Structure, and Ritual". Annual Review of Anthropology 19:119-150.
