= Morton Fried =

American anthropologist (1923–1986)

Morton Herbert Fried (March 21, 1923 in Bronx, New York – December 18, 1986 in Leonia, New Jersey), was a distinguished professor of anthropology at Columbia University in New York City from 1950 until his death in 1986. He made considerable contributions to the fields of social and political theory.

== Biography ==
Fried attended Townsend Harris High School and then the City College of New York. At City College, he was originally an English major but changed to anthropology. While a student at CCNY, Fried and his friend Richard F. Shepard formed the Mundial Upheaval Society, which later flourished at Columbia University.

Fried served in the U.S. Army during World War II, after one year of graduate work in anthropology at Columbia. In the Army, he was sent to Harvard to learn Chinese and he went on to specialize in the anthropology of China, earning his Ph.D. at Columbia in 1951. He did fieldwork in 1947–48 in Anhui Province, China, and published his research in The Fabric of Chinese Society (1953).

His mentors were Julian Steward and Karl Wittfogel.

His cohort included Elman Service, Eric Wolf, Sidney Mintz and Stanley Diamond. His first graduate teaching assistant was Marvin Harris and his first graduate student was Marshall Sahlins.

He taught one semester at Yale University during the All Term of 1965. He was a visiting professor at the University of Michigan for one year, 1960–61. He married Martha Nemes, and the couple had two children, Nancy Fried Foster, an anthropologist and Elman Steven Fried, a writer and filmmaker.

A resident of Leonia, New Jersey, Fried died at his home there on December 18, 1986.

== Select bibliography ==
- Fried, Morton H. 1959. Readings in anthropology. New York: Crowell.
- Fried, Morton H. 1960. On the evolution of social stratification and the state. Indianapolis: Bobbs-Merrill.
- Fried, Morton. 1965. "A Four Letter Word that Hurts." SATURDAY REVIEW, October 2,. 1965
- Fried, Morton H. 1967. The evolution of political society an essay in political anthropology. Random House studies in anthropology, AS 7. New York: Random House.
- American Anthropological Association, Morton H. Fried, Marvin Harris, and Robert Francis Murphy. 1968. War: the anthropology of armed conflict and aggression. Garden City, N.Y.: Published for the American Museum of Natural History [by] the Natural History Press.
- Fried, Morton H. 1969. Fabric of Chinese society; a study of the social life of a Chinese county seat. New York: Octagon Books.
- Fried, Morton H. 1975. The notion of tribe. Menlo Park, Calif: Cummings Pub. Co.
- Fried, Martha Nemes, and Morton H. Fried. 1980. Transitions: four rituals in eight cultures. New York: Norton.
- Fried, Morton H. 1987. Reflections on Christianity in China. AMERICAN ETHNOLOGIST 14:1, Frontiers of Christian Evangelism, (Feb., 1987): 94-106.
