= Gananath Obeyesekere =

Sri Lankan anthropologist (1930–2025)

- Born: 2 February 1930; Meegama, British Ceylon
- Died: 25 March 2025 (aged 95); Colombo, Sri Lanka
- Education: University of Peradeniya (BA); University of Washington (MA; PhD)
- Occupations: Anthropologist, professor
- Scientific career
- Fields: Anthropology
- Institutions: Princeton University (1980–2000)

Gananath Obeyesekere (2 February 1930 – 25 March 2025) was a Sri Lankan anthropologist of religion and professor of anthropology at Princeton University.

His research focused on psychoanalysis and anthropology and how personal symbolism is related to religious experience, in addition to the European exploration of Polynesia in the 18th century and after, and the implications of these voyages for the development of ethnography.

His books include Land Tenure in Village Ceylon, Medusa's Hair, The Cult of the Goddess Pattini, Buddhism Transformed (coauthor), The Work of Culture, The Apotheosis of Captain Cook: European Mythmaking in the Pacific, and Making Karma. He did much of his fieldwork in Sri Lanka.

== Life and career ==
Obeyesekere was born in Meegama, British Ceylon (now in Western Province, Sri Lanka). He completed a B.A. in English (1955) at the University of Ceylon, Peradeniya, followed by an M.A. (1958) and PhD (1964) at the University of Washington.

Before his appointment to Princeton, Obeyesekere held teaching positions at the University of Ceylon, the University of Washington and the University of California, San Diego. He was chair of the Princeton University Anthropology department and a professor from 1980 until his retirement in 2000.

Obeyesekere received several academic awards, including the Thomas H. Huxley medal by the Royal Anthropological Institute in recognition of his scholarly contributions to the discipline. He was awarded a Guggenheim fellowship in 1978.

He died in Colombo on 25 March 2025, at the age of 95.

== Debate with Marshall Sahlins ==
In the 1990s, Obeyesekere entered into a well-known intellectual debate with Marshall Sahlins over the rationality of indigenous peoples. The debate was carried out through an examination of the details of the death of James Cook in the Hawaiian Islands in 1779.

At the heart of the debate was how to understand the rationality of indigenous people. Obeyesekere insisted that indigenous people thought in essentially the same way as Westerners and was concerned that any argument otherwise would paint them as "irrational" and "uncivilized".

In contrast, Sahlins argued that each culture may have different types of rationality that make sense of the world by focusing on different patterns and explain them within specific cultural narratives, and that assuming that all cultures lead to a single rational view is a form of Eurocentrism.

== Books ==
- Land Tenure in Village Ceylon: A Sociological And Historical Study, 1967
- Medusa's Hair: An Essay On Personal Symbols And Religious Experience, 1981 ISBN 0226616002
- The Cult of the Goddess Pattini, 1984 ISBN 0226616029
- Buddhism Transformed: Religious Change in Sri Lanka (with Richard Gombrich), 1988 ISBN 9780691226859
- The Work Of Culture: Symbolic Transformation in Psychoanalysis And Anthropology, 1990 ISBN 0226615987
- The Apotheosis Of Captain Cook: European Mythmaking in the Pacific, 1992 ISBN 9780691057521
- Imagining Karma: Ethical Transformation in Amerindian, Buddhist, and Greek Rebirth, 2002 ISBN 9780520936300
- Cannibal Talk : The Man-Eating Myth and Human Sacrifice in the South Seas, 2005 ISBN 9781597345224
- Karma and Rebirth, 2005
- The Awakened Ones: Phenomenology of Visionary Experience, 2012 ISBN 9780231527309
- The Doomed King: A Requiem For Sri Vikrama Rajasinha, 2017
- Histories: Sri Lankan Pasts and The Dilemmas of Narrative Representation, 2019
- The Many Faces of the Kandyan Kingdom: 1591–1765, Lessons for our Time, 2020
- Placating the Demons: Ritual Practices Among Sri Lankans, 2021
- Vädda Presence in the Kandyan Kingdom: A Re-Examination, 2022

== Other works ==
- Kataragama: A God For All Seasons, 1973
