= Nqobile Magwizi =

Zimbabwean businessman and ZIFA president

- Born: 22 January 1979 (age 47); Zimbabwe
- Education: University of South Africa (BCom); University of Cape Town; University of Salford (MSc); Stellenbosch University (MPhil)
- Occupations: Businessman, Football Administrator
- Organization: Tatu Advertising
- Title: President of Zimbabwe Football Association (ZIFA)
- Term: January 2025 – Present

Nqobile Magwizi (born 22 January 1979) is a Zimbabwean businessman and football administrator who serves as the President of the Zimbabwe Football Association (ZIFA) since January 2025. Elected with 66 of 77 votes in a ZIFA electoral assembly that marked the end of a three-year FIFA normalisation committee administration, his appointment was widely covered across regional media outlets as a significant shift in Zimbabwean football governance. In his opening months, Magwizi prioritized preparing Zimbabwe's national team for the 2025 Africa Cup of Nations, whilst committing to institutional reforms aimed at restoring stakeholder confidence in ZIFA. Magwizi is also co-founder and non-executive chairman of Tatu Advertising, established in 2004, which marked its 20th anniversary in 2024.

== Early life and education ==
Magwizi was born in Zimbabwe. According to The Herald, he holds a Bachelor of Commerce in Marketing Management from the University of South Africa (UNISA) and a certificate in Property Development and Investment from the University of Cape Town (UCT). He completed postgraduate studies with an MSc in International Banking and Finance from the University of Salford in the United Kingdom and a Master of Philosophy (MPhil) in Development Finance from Stellenbosch University. He is also a qualified Chartered Accountant (ACCA).

== Business career ==
Magwizi co-founded **Tatu Advertising** on 5 October 2004 alongside Carl Joshua Ncube and Chido Madzivanyika. The agency, whose name means "three" in Shona, reflecting its three founders, expanded to become a prominent marketing and communications firm in Zimbabwe. As of 2025, Magwizi serves as non-executive chairman. The company marked two decades of operation with celebration events in October 2024.

Magwizi also founded **NC and Banat Strategic Partners**, a property and infrastructure advisory firm. The company has been involved in major national projects, including coordination roles in the refurbishment of Rufaro Stadium and rehabilitation works on the Harare-Beitbridge Road, one of Zimbabwe's primary transport corridors.

== Football administration ==
=== Early involvement ===
Magwizi has held board positions within Zimbabwean football administration, serving as a member of Banket Football Club's board of directors since 2017. In 2022, he was appointed to the board of the Sports and Recreation Commission (SRC), a statutory body overseeing sports governance in Zimbabwe.

=== Sponsorship facilitation ===
Magwizi became known in football administration circles for his role in facilitating commercial partnerships. He is credited with brokering sponsorship arrangements between international investors and Zimbabwe's major football clubs. Through negotiations with Sakunda Holdings, a significant Zimbabwean business entity, Magwizi helped arrange a multi-year sponsorship package valued at US$5.3 million for Highlanders F.C. and Dynamos F.C., the country's two most prominent football clubs. The sponsorship deal, which began in 2021, was renewed in 2024, supporting player development and operational budgets for both clubs.

=== ZIFA Presidency ===
On 25 January 2025, Magwizi was elected President of ZIFA, winning 66 of 77 votes cast by member associations and football stakeholders at an electoral assembly held in Harare. His election ended a period of institutional transition; FIFA had imposed a normalisation committee administration on ZIFA since late 2022 over concerns regarding government interference in football matters. The election was among the first major sporting governance votes held in Zimbabwe following the lifting of the international sanctions regime in March 2024.

During his election campaign, Magwizi outlined a platform centred on "driving financial stability through innovative revenue streams and commercialization, investing in modern infrastructure to support players and communities alike." Immediately after his election, he identified the Zimbabwe Warriors' preparation for the 2025 Africa Cup of Nations as the administration's primary immediate objective, stating to media that the tournament represented "a very important assignment" and a "national platform where we could be seen how well we are performing." He also signaled a broader agenda of institutional reform, noting that ZIFA required foundational work "to ensure we come up with best practices of how to make ZIFA an efficient institution that will deliver" and to "rebuild faith and have partners" with commercial and governmental stakeholders.

Following his election, Magwizi was appointed to the FIFA Commercial and Marketing Advisory Committee, a four-year position aligning with FIFA governance structures. His committee role underscored FIFA's confidence in the new ZIFA leadership and provided Magwizi with a formal seat in FIFA's commercial and governance discussions affecting African football.

== Personal life ==
Magwizi was listed on the United States Department of the Treasury's Specially Designated Nationals and Blocked Persons List (SDN) from approximately 2018 to 2024, designating him as a person associated with sanctioned business interests. The listing was connected to his business associations with Kudakwashe Tagwirei, a Zimbabwean businessman whose companies had been subject to U.S. financial sanctions. Magwizi was officially removed from the SDN list in March 2024, following the Biden administration's revocation of the broader Zimbabwe sanctions regime, which had been in place for over two decades.
