= Peter Sahlins =

American historian of France and Europe (born 1957)

- Born: April 26, 1957 (age 69)
- Education: Harvard University; Princeton University
- Occupation: Historian
- Father: Marshall Sahlins

Peter Sahlins (born April 26, 1957) is an American historian of France and Europe. A Professor Emeritus in the History Department at the University of California, Berkeley, Sahlins taught from 1989 to 2019.

Sahlins founded and directed multiple entities at UC Berkeley, including the France-Berkeley Fund (1992-2002), UC Paris (2002-5) and the Interdisciplinary Studies Field in the Undergraduate Division (2013-9). From 2006 to 2008 he was on leave at the Social Science Research Council as its Director of Academic Programs, where he directed the major fellowship programs and led a new environmental programming initiative. Since 2007, Sahlins has served on the Board of Directors of the international NGO Bibliothèques sans frontiéres (Libraries Without Borders).

In 2026, he and philosopher Ramona Naddaff took over as executive publishers of Prickly Paradigm Press. The press publishes pamphlets spanning disciplines and topics –– from anarchism to artificial intelligence –– to bring depth to questions of broader public concern.

== Biography ==
Sahlins was born into a Jewish family. His father was the noted anthropologist Marshall Sahlins.

Sahlins received his B.A. from Harvard in 1979 and his Ph.D. in history from Princeton in 1986. He taught at Columbia and Yale before joining the history department at the University of California, Berkeley, in 1989. He has served widely on university and professional committees, was executive director of the France-Berkeley Fund (1994-2002) and founding director of the University of California's Paris Study Center and its international programs. He is a former director of the Interdisciplinary Studies Field major at Berkeley.

He lives in France, dividing his time between Paris and Arcy-sur-Cure.

== Work ==
Peter Sahlins’ research spans France and Spain from the seventeenth to the nineteenth century, focusing on questions of boundaries and identities; immigration, naturalization, and citizenship; the history of forests and forestry in France; human animal relations; and the history of prehistory.

He has written on a range of topics, including the formation of national identities and frontiers (Boundaries: The Making of France and Spain in the Pyrenées, UC Press, 1989 ISBN 978-0520074156); Forest Governance, Peasant Culture and Protest in the Nineteenth Century (The War of the Demoiselles in Nineteenth-Century France, Harvard University Press, 1994 ISBN 978-0674308961); State-Building and Immigration in Seventeenth-Century France (with Jean-Francois Dubost, Et si on faisait payer les étrangers? Louis XIV, les immigrés et quelques autres, Flammarion, 1999 ISBN 978-2082118064); The Premodern History of Nationality Law (Unnaturally French: Foreign Citizens in the Old Regime and After, Cornell University Press, 2004 ISBN 978-0801488399); and most recently on animals, 1668: The Year of the Animal in France (New York: Zone Books, 2017 ISBN 978-1935408994).

His most recent work, Neanderthals Among Us: The Making of a Prehistoric Human (London: Oneworld; and Cambridge, MA: Harvard University Press, 2026 ISBN 978-0-674-30847-3).
