= Keith Hart (anthropologist) =

British anthropologist

Keith Hart (born in Manchester, England in 1943, died November 6, 2025) was a British anthropologist and writer living in Paris. His main research focused on economic anthropology, Africa and the African diaspora, and money. He taught at universities including East Anglia, Manchester, Yale and the Chicago, as well as at Cambridge University where he was director of the African Studies Centre. He contributed the concept of the informal economy to development studies and has published widely on economic anthropology. He is the author of The informal economy in development: Evidence from German, British and Australian New Guinea. His written work focuses on the national limits of politics in a globalised economy.

== Early life and education ==
Hart was born in Manchester and attended Manchester Grammar School. He later studied at Cambridge University. He started as classicist before switching to the anthropology of religion, and then studied his PhD at Cambridge in migrant politics in Ghana.

In 1993, Keith Hart and Anna Grimshaw started a small press called Prickly Pear. Together, they published a series of ten pamphlets. "We emulate the passionate amateurs of history who circulated new and radical ideas to as wide an audience as possible," they said. "And we hope in the process to reinvent anthropology as a means of engaging with society." In 2001, Prickly Paradigm established itself as a new incarnation of Prickly Pear with Marshall Sahlins as publisher.

== Academic career ==
Hart studied for two years the Frafra people of Northern Ghana made famous as the Tallensi by his department head, Meyer Fortes, and submitted his PhD thesis in 1969. His doctoral research focused on the life histories of small- to medium-sized entrepreneurs in urban Ghana. This work laid the foundation for the concept of the informal economy an idea he introduced in the early 1970s to describe economic activities outside formal state regulation. He initially presented the idea at a conference in Sussex in 1971, aiming to translate ethnographic insights into terms intelligible to economists.

Several commentators pointed out that this was the idea of Hart’s conference paper, ‘Informal income opportunities and urban employment in Ghana’, published a year later in 1973. He intended to focus analytical and empirical attention on the interaction of the formal/informal pair, not to found a concept defining a new and separate field of study. He therefore ignored the idea’s growing prominence until the late 1990s. In the first decade of the new century, the general focus turned to dynamic linkages between formal and informal branches of local economy. Hart published several comparative essays on this relationship. But ‘the informal economy’ as a label citing his 1973 paper persists as an academic and bureaucratic field of study until now. Hart taught at a dozen universities, including East Anglia, Manchester, Yale, Michigan, McGill, Chicago and Goldsmiths, and for 14 years at the University of Cambridge, later as Centennial Professor of International Development at the London School of Economics. At the University of Pretoria, he co-directed the Human Economy Programme for doctoral and postdoc fellows aiming to develop alternatives to mainstream economics.

== Research and contributions ==
Hart is best known for pioneering the concept of the informal economy through his ethnographic research in West Africa, especially Ghana, during the 1970s. His work highlighted the significance of informal employment and economic practices outside of formal state or corporate systems. This contribution influenced development studies, anthropology, geography, sociology and policy discussions on employment and economic inclusion.

== Public anthropology and digital publishing ==
Hart was a longstanding advocate of open access, using both print and online media to bring anthropology to a general readership and to foster a wider community among anthropologists. From 1993 he and Anna Grimshaw produced the Prickly Pear Pamphlets (Prickly Pear Press), a Cambridge series aimed at a wide public and intended, in their words, "to reinvent anthropology as a means of engaging with society". He took the same approach online around 2000 with the website and blog The Memory Bank, which reproduces the full text of his book of that name together with his other writings. In 2009 he and Justin Shaffner founded the Open Anthropology Cooperative, a Ning-hosted network (with its own imprint, OAC Press) that grew out of a forum the two had set up on The Memory Bank. It aimed to link anthropologists worldwide, professional and amateur alike, and reached several thousand members over roughly a decade. In his later years he also wrote on Substack, as A Better World Somewhere.
