= Johane Masowe =

Zimbabwean prophet, founder of the Gospel of God Church, and Izwi raMwari

- Born: Shoniwa Masedza Tandi Moyo; 1914 or 1915; Gandanzara village, Makoni, eastern Zimbabwe
- Died: 13 September 1973 (aged 58); Ndola, Zambia
- Occupations: Prophet, religious leader, saviour
- Known for: Founder of the Gospel of God Church (Izwi raMwari); African liberation theology; embodiment of the Word of God for Africa

Shoniwa Masedza Tandi Moyo (born 1914 or 1915 – 13 September 1973), known by his prophetic name Johane Masowe ("John of the Wilderness"), was a Zimbabwean prophet, saviour figure, and founder of the Gospel of God Church (also known as Izwi raMwari or "Voice of God") in 1932,according to Dillon Malone. The Dictionary of African Christian Biography identifies him as the "Founder of the Gospel of God Church in Zimbabwe." Dillon-Malone documents that Masowe taught his followers that he is Izwi raMwari (the Word or Voice of God) and Mudzimu waMwari (the Spirit of God), and they continue to regard him as such—the unique divine messenger and saviour for African peoples. Mukonyora describes this movement as the "Masowe Apostles" and notes that its sacred texts are collected in a volume called the Gospel of God. Masowe is widely regarded as one of the most significant African religious figures of the 20th century, having built a continent-wide movement without foreign financial support while enduring persistent colonial persecution. His prophetic name later gave rise to a separate religious movement, the Johane Masowe weChishanu Church, though Masowe himself never named a church after his own person. His name alludes to John the Baptist and his practice of worshipping in the wilderness.

== Early life ==
Johane Masowe was born in 1914 or 1915 in Gandanzara village in Makoni district of eastern Zimbabwe, the second of six sons and a daughter born to Jack and Efie Masedza, of the Manyika subgroup of the Shona people. The area was part of the former Rozvi confederation, and traditional spirit mediums (vasvikiro) who had been closely connected with the Rozvi kings still exercised ritual authority. Significantly, Masowe was a Tandi from the Makoni district, and the holder of the Rozvi title, Tandi, whose presence was required at the installation of a Makoni, was living there. Dillon-Malone notes that "the influence of traditional Shona religious beliefs must have played a major part in conditioning his religious awareness and outlook."

Mukonyora notes that the Gospel of God text describes his birthplace as Gandanzara, meaning "Land of Hunger," reflecting the impact of colonial land seizures that pushed Africans to more barren areas.

As a young man, Masowe left his rural home and moved to Salisbury (now Harare), the capital of the British colony of Southern Rhodesia. There he worked a series of odd jobs, including as a "garden boy" (domestic servant), a carpenter's apprentice, and later as an assistant in a cobbler's shop. These early experiences of urban poverty and racial discrimination under white colonial rule shaped his later prophetic message, which combined spiritual renewal with social and economic critique.

== Divine calling and theophany ==
=== The illness, vision and deep religious experience ===
In 1932, while working as a carpenter's helper in Salisbury, Masowe suffered a prolonged illness characterized by severe headaches. The condition became so serious that he lost the ability to speak or walk. During this period of physical debility, he experienced a powerful dream in which he died and journeyed to the afterlife. In this vision, he heard voices announcing that his name was now John—a reference to John the Baptist.

According to the account he gave to colonial authorities on 1 November 1932, as recorded in the National Archives of Zimbabwe and reproduced by Dillon-Malone: "During my sickness, I had a dream one day. I dreamt that I was dead. I heard a voice telling me to pray to God. When I awoke, I prayed to God and lit seven candles that I had in the hut. It was during my illness that I heard voices telling me that I was John. I had never been called that name before. I thought that I was meant to be called 'John the Baptist'. I therefore used that name. I felt that when that name was given to me that I should go and preach to the natives. I think that I was given that name, 'John the Baptist', by God."

Police records from the white colonial regime, preserved in the National Archives of Zimbabwe, document Masowe's explanation of his experience. He told authorities: "I really do believe that I have been sent from heaven to carry out religious work among the natives. I think that I am 'John the Baptist,' as the voice told me so. No human being has guided me in my teachings."

=== The forty-day fast on Marimba Hill ===
Following his recovery, Masowe proceeded to Marimba Hill, located near the town of Norton, approximately 40 kilometers southwest of Salisbury. There he engaged in an extended period of prayer and fasting that lasted forty days. According to his account, he did not sleep during this entire period and survived only on wild honey found in the area.

Dillon-Malone records Masowe's own words to the Chief Native Commissioner: "When I got better, I left the compound that I was staying in and went to a hill near Norton and remained there for forty days praying by myself. The only food I had during this time was wild honey. I prayed to heaven day and night. I did not sleep. Whilst staying on the hill, I used to hear a voice saying, 'I have blessed you. Carry on with the good work. Tell the natives to throw away their witchcraft medicines, not to commit adultery or rape. . . .'"

At the conclusion of this forty-day ordeal, Masowe reported that a voice spoke to him from a burning bush—an explicit parallel to the biblical account of Moses's calling in the Book of Exodus. Dillon-Malone records: "The voice would come to me through a bush that was burning quite near me. When the voice ceased, the fire would go out." After receiving this commission, his headaches ceased permanently.

== Divinity and Christological Status: Izwi raMwari ==
    1. The Word and Spirit of God

According to Dillon-Malone's extensive ethnographic research, the central belief of the Masowe Apostles concerns the unique divine status of their founder. Johane Masowe is referred to by his followers as Izwi raMwari (the Word or Voice of God) and as Mudzimu waMwari (the Spirit of God). Dillon-Malone notes that these are "both traditional concepts within the Shona religious belief system" that have been reappropriated to express Masowe's singular role as the divine mediator for Africa.

The theological framework of the Masowe Apostles is centered entirely upon "Jehovah's choice of African peoples through their saviour, Johane Masowe." Dillon-Malone identifies four interconnected aspects that pivot upon the mediating role of Johane Masowe: 1. Johane Masowe as the expression of the spirit and of the word of God 2. The record of 'The Good News of Johane Masowe for Africa' as proof of the authenticity of Johane's God-given mission 3. The Bible as the written word of God for African peoples brought by Johane 4. The collective body of Sisters as the visible sign and symbol of the presence of the spirit of God with his people

    1. The embodiment of Scripture

Dillon-Malone documents that Masowe's followers did not initially identify his Bible as an ordinary Bible, for it had been given to him by God specifically to carry out his mission among Africans. Masowe encouraged his followers to throw away their Bibles which had become "too closely associated with the white Christ and the white mission churches." The Book which he himself had brought was "the special word of God for Africa."

Crucially, Dillon-Malone states: "Only he, as the lawfully appointed messenger of God, was in a position to interpret the meaning of this Book. Indeed, Johane himself was the word of God for Africa and, by listening to him, African peoples would learn what God wanted them to do."

When the Apostles later began to study the Bible more seriously, they identified the Bible with what their founder was saying. Dillon-Malone records: "Today, it has become accepted as the word of Johane Masowe who himself is the word of God for Africa."

    1. The saviour for Africa

Dillon-Malone records the foundational narrative of the Masowe Apostles from the Bvuma account. In this sacred text, all races are represented in heaven except for the Africans, who are blocked because they had not yet received their saviour through whom they could be properly baptized. Johane, however, was going to return to earth to remedy the situation.

When confronted by white authorities who insisted that Jesus is "the new way," Johane responded: "I am John the Baptist... I was sent as a messenger to the Africans... In God's language, 'Johane' means 'a new beginner' or 'the beginner of new things'. I am making a new way amongst black people. Our fathers never learnt this way."

Dillon-Malone notes that Masowe's struggle is portrayed as primarily against the evils of traditional Shona society—witches and all that is connected with them—in order to bring his people the saving power of baptism. His struggle against white political and religious powers exists only insofar as they have failed to help his own people or are attempting to prevent him from saving them from evil.

    1. Miraculous prison escapes

The Bvuma account recorded by Dillon-Malone describes that, like Peter in Acts 12:6–17, an angel was sent to Masowe to release him from prison miraculously. His white garment, staff, and Bible were taken from him because the white powers knew that his new power rested in these objects.

    1. No successor

Following Masowe's death in 1973, a Synod of loyalist Apostles was held at Gandanzara from 24 September to 2 October 1974. This synod was not only intended to decide on the question of succession but also—in accordance with traditional Shona religious custom—to complete the burial rites and decide on the proper allocation of the wives and property of the deceased.

The very fact that a synod was required to address succession indicates that Masowe, as the unique embodiment of the Word of God for Africa, left no appointed successor. His role as Izwi raMwari was singular and unrepeatable.

== Founding of Gospel of God Church(Izwi raMwari) ==
Emboldened by his visionary experiences, Masowe began his public ministry in 1932, founding the movement he named Izwi raMwari (the "Voice of God"), commonly translated as the Gospel of God Church. Mukonyora confirms that the Gospel of God is "a collection of sacred texts" compiled by Dillon-Malone with some of the immediate followers of Johane Masowe, and that these texts "tell stories about the founder of the Masowe Apostles, Johane Masowe, the pillar of a church inspired by stories from the Bible."

This original movement, whose members are known as vaPostori (Apostles) or the "Masowe Apostles," observed Saturday as the Sabbath and is characterized by white garments, shaved heads (for men), and barefoot worship in open spaces called masowe (wilderness). The movement's distinctive practices—rejection of formal church buildings, emphasis on direct spiritual experience, and commitment to self-reliance—would become hallmarks of Masowe's religious vision.

== Itinerant ministry and persecution ==
=== Early preaching and response ===
Masowe's message spread rapidly among the African population of Southern Rhodesia. He preached a radical gospel that demanded both spiritual purification and social transformation. His core requirements for followers were clear: they must destroy all objects associated with witchcraft, including charms and fetishes, and they must abstain from adultery and rape.

Crowds responded enthusiastically to his preaching. Native Commissioners' documents from the colonial administration indicate that authorities witnessed large numbers of Africans handing over their fetishes and charms to Masowe, along with other items dedicated to witchcraft practices. This wholesale rejection of traditional spiritual objects represented a significant break with established African religious practices and signaled the emergence of a new religious movement.

By June 1933, the Assistant Native Commissioner of Wedza reported that the followers of Johane Masowe had begun to refer to themselves as Apostles, causing confusion with the Apostolic Faith Mission. The report noted that adherents of the AFM had "virtually allied themselves with him and are daily gaining more and more adherents in this district, in many cases taking away members of other Churches."

Complaints poured in to the authorities from African chiefs and elders, as well as from many established mission churches, concerning the dangerous effect which certain preachers were having on younger people. Children were being drawn away from school to participate in the activities of these preachers, and young people were spending nights on hillsides in what authorities considered to be highly dubious circumstances.

    1. Arrests and imprisonment

The colonial authorities viewed Masowe's growing influence with alarm. He had first been arrested in February 1932 for trespassing at Norton, at which time he had been traveling under the fictitious name of 'Mtunyane' and had not been in possession of a registration certificate. On 1 November 1932, he was brought before the Chief Native Commissioner for questioning—once again not being in possession of a registration certificate.

According to the Dictionary of African Christian Biography, Masowe "had no intention of abiding by colonial restrictions on his movements, but continued to preach and baptize wherever he went, even after he was arrested and imprisoned several more times." Documents from Native Commissioners' offices show that colonial authorities kept Masowe under constant surveillance, tracking his movements and monitoring his influence among African populations.

Despite multiple arrests and periods of imprisonment, Masowe refused to modify his message or curtail his activities. His defiance of colonial authority became itself a powerful symbol for his followers, many of whom experienced similar racial discrimination and legal harassment under the white minority regime.

=== Cross-cultural mission to Matabeleland ===
At the end of the 1930s, Masowe moved south to Matabeleland, the territory of the Ndebele people. Dillon-Malone records that "he found large numbers of Ndebele waiting to be baptised. Although the Ndebele had never been on good terms with the Shona, the dynamic evangelist, Lazarus Chipanga, had preached the message of the Shona prophet with great success."

Dillon-Malone draws a significant parallel: "The Shona and Ndebele had joined once before in 1896–97 in military uprisings against a common white foe; now, they had responded together to the appearance of an African saviour. If the Ndebele tended to reject Johane as a Shona, many readily accepted his message and what he stood for as a God-sent messenger to African peoples."

The Apostles established their headquarters at Bulawayo where they began to organise themselves on a more secure basis. Positions of authority were allocated to various members and economic enterprises were undertaken.

== Economic Liberation and Self-Reliance: The Korsten Basketmakers ==
    1. The search for a permanent home

Harassment from Government authorities and African chiefs began to interfere once again with the activity of the Apostles, forcing them to look for a suitable place in South Africa to which they might move their headquarters. Johane himself and a number of his followers had already travelled to the Transvaal a number of times at the beginning of the 1940s, and numerous converts had already been made there.

The Apostles settled for a few years in the Transvaal, moving between the location of Eastwood in Pretoria and those of Everton and Orlando in Johannesburg. Dillon-Malone notes that "these were years of great hardship, and the Apostles found it very difficult to eke out a livelihood. They also suffered harassment from the authorities there."

Between 1943 and 1947, Johane travelled south as far as Cape Town and east as far as Durban in an attempt to find a place where he and his followers might settle without disturbance. It was not until the end of the 1940s that he finally settled with a small group of followers in the Korsten district of Port Elizabeth.

    1. The Korsten years: prosperity and self-organisation

From 1947 onwards, groups of Masowe Apostles continued to join their founder in Korsten where his headquarters had become established. Despite the slum conditions of Korsten, Dillon-Malone records that the Masowe Apostles looked upon these years as "years of prosperity and peace, years in which they were not troubled by outsiders, years in which they had become organised on a secure and stable basis."

It was in Korsten that the Apostles came to regard themselves as an officially established church with officially recognised ministers. Membership cards were printed and distributed to all so that they might be able to obtain exemption from pass laws and travel concessions.

    1. The church stamp: symbol of Africa's enlightenment

An official church stamp was designed which comprised a seven-branched candlestick mounted on a globe with the map of Africa facing outwards. Dillon-Malone records the explanation given by Elliot Gabellah, who designed the stamp: "I was thinking about the word of God overlapping the globe and going right round the world, not being restricted to any particular area. The candlestick was symbolic of the holy place, the Holy of Holies. In the Hebrew set-up, the number seven is quite important and therefore there are seven lights to enlighten the world."

The Bible text referred to was Rev. 4:5: '… and there are seven lamps of fire burning before the throne, and these mean the seven spirits of God.' The symbolic significance of the stamp, according to Dillon-Malone, is that "the Apostles are the light of God to Africa."

    1. Self-help projects and the Basketmaker identity

Masowe initiated self-help craft projects in Korsten that became a trademark of his followers. These projects, focused on basket weaving and other artisanal crafts, earned Masowe's followers the nickname "Korsten Basketmakers." Dillon-Malone notes that "when outsiders refer to them as the 'Basketmakers', they are proudly reminded of their days in Korsten."

The self-help projects embodied Masowe's commitment to economic self-reliance and his rejection of dependency on white missionary institutions or colonial welfare. They provided practical skills and income for his followers while also serving as a model of African economic independence. To those who had lived there, Korsten continues to stir up nostalgic memories; to those who had never been there, it is surrounded by a mysterious quality.

=== Deportation from South Africa ===
On 7 June 1962, the first trainload of Basketmakers arrived at Plumtree in Southern Rhodesia. From there, they were moved to a temporary reception camp which had been erected at Mutunduluka about seven miles away. The last trainload arrived on 16 June, and the total number of Basketmakers deported from South Africa had come to 1,880 persons. The total cost of transportation was borne by the South African Government, and no custom duty was charged on the Basketmakers' personal belongings when entering Southern Rhodesia.

This mass deportation could have destroyed a less resilient movement, but the Masowe Apostles adapted and continued to grow.

== Continental expansion and global reach ==
From Zambia, where many followers had settled, the movement spread throughout central and east Africa. Masowe himself took up residence in Dar es Salaam, Tanzania, in 1964, and later lived in Arusha, Tanzania, and Nairobi, Kenya.

The expansion continued throughout the late 1960s and early 1970s. According to the DACB, the vaPostori entered Kenya in 1967, Mozambique in 1969, and Congo (Zaire) in 1972.

Mukonyora (2020) provides a comprehensive list of the countries to which the Masowe Apostles migrated, documenting the full continental reach of the movement: "migration from Zimbabwe to Botswana, South Africa, Mozambique, Zambia, Malawi, Tanzania, Kenya, and beyond."

By the time of Masowe's death, the movement had established a significant presence across the African continent, from South Africa in the south to Kenya in the east and Congo in the center.

Dillon-Malone records that the Synod of loyalist Apostles held at Gandanzara from 24 September to 2 October 1974 was attended by representatives from Rhodesia, South Africa, Botswana, Zambia, Malawi, Mozambique, and Kenya. The total number present was 16,500 people, of whom two thousand were elders (i.e., ordained members) including 135 heads of congregations.

By 1974, the Masowe Apostles had become established in nine different African countries: Rhodesia (Zimbabwe), South Africa, Botswana, Mozambique, Zambia, Tanzania, Malawi, Kenya, and Zaire (Congo).

Mukonyora further notes that Masowe Apostles have since spread beyond Africa and "can be found in big cities in England and North America."

== Death and the question of succession ==
Masowe died in Ndola, Zambia, in September 1973. His body was flown by airplane to his birthplace in Gandanzara, Zimbabwe, for burial.

By the time of his death, the movement he had founded without any foreign financial support or missionary training had grown dramatically. According to the Dictionary of African Christian Biography, "the number of Masowe vaPostori exceeded half a million people in nine nations of southern, central, and east Africa." Dillon-Malone records that the General Secretary of the Masowe Apostles in Nairobi claimed in early 1975 that their total number exceeded half a million—not taking into account the split which had occurred. Large numbers had been baptised in Southern Rhodesia, Northern Rhodesia, and Nyasaland.

Mukonyora confirms that "Johane Masowe's own journey left behind thousands of followers in southern, central and east Africa because he became the prophet setting an example by 'wandering in the wilderness.'"

The DACB emphasizes the remarkable nature of this achievement: "Without foreign help, he raised up a group of disciples from numerous people groups and languages who followed him wholeheartedly."

Following Masowe's death, a Synod of loyalist Apostles was held at Gandanzara from 24 September to 2 October 1974. Dillon-Malone records that this synod was "not only intended to decide on the question of succession but also—in accordance with traditional Shona religious custom—to complete the burial rites and decide on the proper allocation of the wives and property of the deceased." The very fact that a synod was required to address succession indicates that Masowe, as the unique embodiment of the Word of God for Africa, had left no appointed successor.

== Theology and practices ==
=== Critique of African traditional religion and Christianity ===
Masowe's theology represented a radical departure from both African traditional religion and the Christianity practiced by European missionaries.

On one hand, he demanded that Africans abandon witchcraft and traditional spiritual practices. His followers were required to surrender their charms, fetishes, and other objects associated with traditional religion. This rejection of indigenous spiritual heritage was a form of religious purification that positioned Masowe's movement as a new departure rather than a continuation of existing traditions.

On the other hand, Masowe rejected the Christianity brought by European missionaries. According to the DACB, "He could not support a religion like the white Christianity that he knew, where Africans were second-class and had to get an education in order to preach or come close to God."

This dual critique—rejecting both African traditional religion and colonial Christianity—allowed Masowe to position his movement as an authentically African form of Christianity that was neither a simple adaptation of imported European religion nor a continuation of pre-colonial traditions.

    1. Rejection of the Bible

One of Masowe's most controversial positions was his initial rejection of the Bible. The DACB explains that "he initially even rejected the Bible because Africans did not originally have books; the Bible in book form implied the need for European education and money in order to know what God wants."

Dillon-Malone provides deeper insight into this rejection. Masowe encouraged his followers to throw away their Bibles which had become "too closely associated with the white Christ and the white mission churches." The Book which he himself had brought was "the special word of God for Africa. Only he, as the lawfully appointed messenger of God, was in a position to interpret the meaning of this Book. Indeed, Johane himself was the word of God for Africa and, by listening to him, African peoples would learn what God wanted them to do."

When Masowe eventually accepted the Bible, he still objected to how Europeans used it. The DACB notes that "he still objected to how Europeans used it, believing white Christianity was too academic and failed to touch Africans' deepest needs. He preferred to do what people in the Bible did—supernatural healings, prophetic utterances, exorcisms, and ecstatic worship—rather than only read about it."

    1. Liberation theology

Mukonyora has developed the most systematic analysis of Masowe's theological significance. She describes Masowe Apostles as "theologians of liberation whose understanding of God is lived, dramatized, and embodied."

Instead of simply reading stories about Moses, John the Baptist, and Jesus wandering in the wilderness as described in Scripture, Masowe Apostles "ground it in their ritual behavior"—walking to the outskirts of cities, removing their shoes, and spending hours praying on the earth.

Mukonyora argues that Masowe "constructs a distinctly African theology of liberation by using the Exodus as symbolic language expressive of human suffering and hope for the redemption of African victims of oppression."

This theological framework transformed the biblical wilderness—traditionally a place of punishment and exile—into "symbolic language expressive of human suffering and hope for the redemption of African victims of oppression." For Masowe and his followers, the wilderness became a site of divine encounter and liberation rather than abandonment.

=== Worship practices ===
The vaPostori continue to practice the forms of worship established by Masowe. They do not have church buildings but meet under trees in open-air venues called masowe (wilderness).

Their worship is characterized by: - Preaching focused on repentance and moral transformation - Baptisms conducted in rivers or dams, which are called "Jordans" in reference to the biblical Jordan River - White garments worn by all participants, symbolizing purity and equality before God - Shaved heads for men, representing humility and separation from worldly concerns - Barefoot worship, acknowledging the holiness of the ground on which they pray

These practices embody Masowe's emphasis on direct, unmediated access to God, unencumbered by the institutional structures and material trappings of European Christianity.

== Legacy ==
=== As Izwi raMwari: The Word of God for Africa ===
According to Dillon-Malone's research, the central and enduring legacy of Johane Masowe is his identity as Izwi raMwari—the Word or Voice of God for Africa. His followers believe that "Johane himself was the word of God for Africa and, by listening to him, African peoples would learn what God wanted them to do." The Bible itself has become "accepted as the word of Johane Masowe who himself is the word of God for Africa."

This understanding places Masowe in a unique category among African religious figures. Unlike prophets who merely convey a message, Masowe is understood by his followers to be the message incarnate. As Dillon-Malone documents, his role is that of a saviour for African peoples, sent from heaven to remedy the situation of Africans who were blocked from entering heaven because they had not yet received their own saviour.

    1. Liberation theology

Mukonyora argues that Masowe "constructs a distinctly African theology of liberation by using the Exodus as symbolic language expressive of human suffering and hope for the redemption of African victims of oppression." Unlike other African Independent Church founders who often accommodated aspects of colonial Christianity, Masowe constructed a complete theological system that rejected Western epistemological hegemony. The Masowe theology of creation is constructed on "a theology of liberation and ecojustice focusing on the notion of God of the Wilderness (re-enacting the Exodus narrative)."

Masowe's innovation was not merely religious but political. He used the Exodus narrative to legitimate his migration from his rural home to urban centers and across international borders, transforming forced displacement caused by colonialism into a spiritual quest for liberation. The term masowe refers simultaneously to a liminal place for divine intervention, draws attention to "problems of displacement caused by colonialism and postcolonial oppression in Zimbabwe," and adapts Christianity to the difficult human conditions that forced him and his followers to migrate during the economic depression of the 1930s.

    1. Colonial persecution

Masowe was arrested and persecuted by colonial authorities. Police records indicate he was arrested in 1932 for "traveling around preaching without proper documents." He was imprisoned "several more times" thereafter, yet "had no intention of abiding by colonial restrictions on his movements." Native Commissioners' documents show authorities kept Masowe under constant surveillance, tracking his movements and monitoring his growing influence among African populations.

Engelke describes his rejection of the Bible as "an act of political defiance" against the colonial state, where literacy and the Book were "particularly charged instruments of struggle." Despite constant harassment, arrest, imprisonment, and surveillance, Masowe continued his ministry without financial resources or foreign support. The DACB notes that "without foreign help, he raised up a group of disciples from numerous people groups and languages who followed him wholeheartedly."

    1. Economic self-reliance: The Basketmaker model

Masowe's legacy includes a powerful model of economic self-reliance. The self-help projects he initiated in Korsten, which earned his followers the nickname "Basketmakers," became a trademark of his movement. Dillon-Malone records that "when outsiders refer to them as the 'Basketmakers', they are proudly reminded of their days in Korsten."

Despite the slum conditions of Korsten, the Masowe Apostles looked upon these years as "years of prosperity and peace, years in which they were not troubled by outsiders, years in which they had become organised on a secure and stable basis." This model of self-organisation and economic independence stands as a lasting contribution to African religious and social thought.

    1. Comparison with other African reformers

Unlike other early African reformers who often worked within or alongside mission structures—such as John Chilembwe (who was educated by American Baptists) or Simon Kimbangu (whose movement was suppressed and who died in captivity)—Masowe maintained complete independence from white missionary control from the outset. He "could not support a religion like the white Christianity that he knew, where Africans were second-class and had to get an education in order to preach or come close to God."

Whereas many African initiated church founders eventually sought accommodation with colonial authorities, Masowe "had no intention of abiding by colonial restrictions" and continued to preach and baptize even after repeated imprisonment. His movement was uniquely self-reliant, developing self-help projects that became a "vaPostori trademark and earned them the name 'Korsten Basketmakers.'"

Mukonyora notes that Masowe's theological achievement was to transform the biblical wilderness—traditionally a place of punishment and exile—into "symbolic language expressive of human suffering and hope for the redemption of African victims of oppression."

    1. Enduring global impact

Masowe's followers, the Masowe Apostles, have migrated "from Zimbabwe to Botswana, South Africa, Mozambique, Zambia, Malawi, Tanzania, Kenya, and beyond." They "can be found in big cities in England and North America." The movement he founded with no financial resources and under constant colonial persecution became one of the most widespread African-initiated churches, with followers across multiple continents.

The Dictionary of African Christian Biography summarizes his achievement: "Without foreign help, he raised up a group of disciples from numerous people groups and languages who followed him wholeheartedly. By the time Masowe died, the number of Masowe vaPostori exceeded half a million people in nine nations."

== Succession and later groups ==
Upon Masowe's death in 1973, several groups emerged claiming his legacy.

The Gospel of God Church (Izwi raMwari), observing Saturday as the Sabbath, represents the direct continuation of the movement Masowe founded and named in 1932. He led this movement until his death in 1973. This is the body documented by the Dictionary of African Christian Biography as the "Gospel of God Church." Mukonyora refers to this original movement as the "Masowe Apostles" and notes that its sacred texts are preserved in the Gospel of God compiled by Dillon-Malone with Masowe's immediate followers.

A separate group, the Johane Masowe weChishanu Church (weChishanu meaning "of Friday"), observes Friday as the Sabbath. This church is named after Masowe's prophetic calling name ("John of the Wilderness"), not after the name Masowe himself gave to his original movement. The weChishanu church claims its origins in Masowe's early ministry, with some sources repeating a church tradition that it was founded in 1931. However, no archival or contemporary records from 1931 support this dating. All verifiable evidence—including colonial police records from 1932 held at the National Archives of Zimbabwe, the movement's own text Izwi raMwari muAfrica (1932), Dillon-Malone's research, Mukonyora's scholarship, and the Dictionary of African Christian Biography—places the beginning of Masowe's ministry and the founding of his church in 1932.

Masowe himself never named a church after his own person. He named his original movement the Gospel of God Church (Izwi raMwari). The use of "Johane Masowe" as a church name is a later development, primarily associated with the weChishanu (Friday) branch.

== See also ==
- Vapostori
- African initiated churches
- Liberation theology
- Simon Kimbangu
- John Chilembwe
