= Natural frontiers =

International borders based on physical features

Natural frontiers is a diplomatic policy that indicates international boundaries and borders should be based on distinct physical features such as coastlines, rivers, mountains, deserts and water basins.

This concept originated in France and has been historically used by Paris to justify claims to certain neighbouring territories. Thus both Louis XIV and Napoleon I used the policy it to claim that the Natural borders of France lay well beyond what was considered acceptable by their neighbouring countries. Revolutionary France used the idea to justified conquest of the Rhineland in 1792–1797.

== See also ==
- Frankfurt proposals
- Natural borders of France
- Roman military frontiers and fortifications
