= Frankfurt proposals =

1813 peace proposal to end the War of the Sixth Coalition

France in its "natural borders" as of 1801

The Frankfurt proposals (also called the Frankfurt memorandum) were peace terms offered to Napoleon I by the Allies in November 1813 during the War of the Sixth Coalition. Drafted at Frankfurt under the direction of Austrian foreign minister Klemens von Metternich, they would have allowed Napoleon to remain emperor while reducing France to its so-called "natural borders". Napoleon delayed his response, and the offer was later withdrawn as Allied war aims hardened.

== Origins ==
The proposals were a Coalition peace initiative designed by Austrian foreign minister Klemens von Metternich. They were offered to French Emperor Napoleon I in November 1813 after he had suffered a decisive defeat at the Battle of Leipzig. The goal was a peaceful end to the War of the Sixth Coalition. The Allies had recaptured most of Germany up to the Rhine, but they had not decided on the next step. Metternich took the initiative. The Allies, meeting in Frankfurt, drafted the proposals under Metternich's close supervision. The British diplomat in attendance, Lord Aberdeen, misunderstood London's position and accepted the moderate terms.

== Terms offered ==
The proposal was that Napoleon would remain as Emperor of France, but France would be reduced to what the French revolutionaries claimed as France's "natural borders." The Natural frontiers were the Pyrenees, the southwest border with Spain, the Alps, the southeast border with Italy, and the Rhine, the border with the German States. France would retain control of Belgium, Savoy, and the Rhineland (the west bank of the Rhine), conquered and annexed by the French Military during the early wars of the French Revolution, while giving up other occupied territories, including parts of Spain, Poland, and the Netherlands, as well as most of Italy and Germany east of the Rhine.

== Meeting at Dresden ==
At a private meeting at Dresden in June, Napoleon and Metternich had already discussed the terms. The final version was relayed to Napoleon by the Baron de Saint-Aignon in November. Metternich told Napoleon that these were the best terms the Allies were likely to offer; after further victories, the terms would become harsher and harsher. Metternich's motivation was to maintain France as a balance against Russian threats, while ending the highly destabilizing series of wars.

== Rejection of the proposals ==
Napoleon, expecting to win the war, delayed too long and lost this opportunity. By December, Austria had signed treaties with the Allies, and London rejected the terms because they might allow Belgium to become a base for an invasion of Britain, and as a result the offer was withdrawn. When the Allies invaded France in late 1813, Napoleon was heavily outnumbered and tried to reopen peace negotiations on the basis of accepting the Frankfurt proposals. The Allies now had new, harsher terms that included the retreat of France to its 1791 boundaries, which meant the loss of Belgium and the Rhineland. Napoleon adamantly refused and after military defeats in France and Paris surrendering, he was finally forced to abdicate on 6 April 1814.

== See also ==
- Napoleonic Wars
