= French irredentism =

Irredentist movement of France

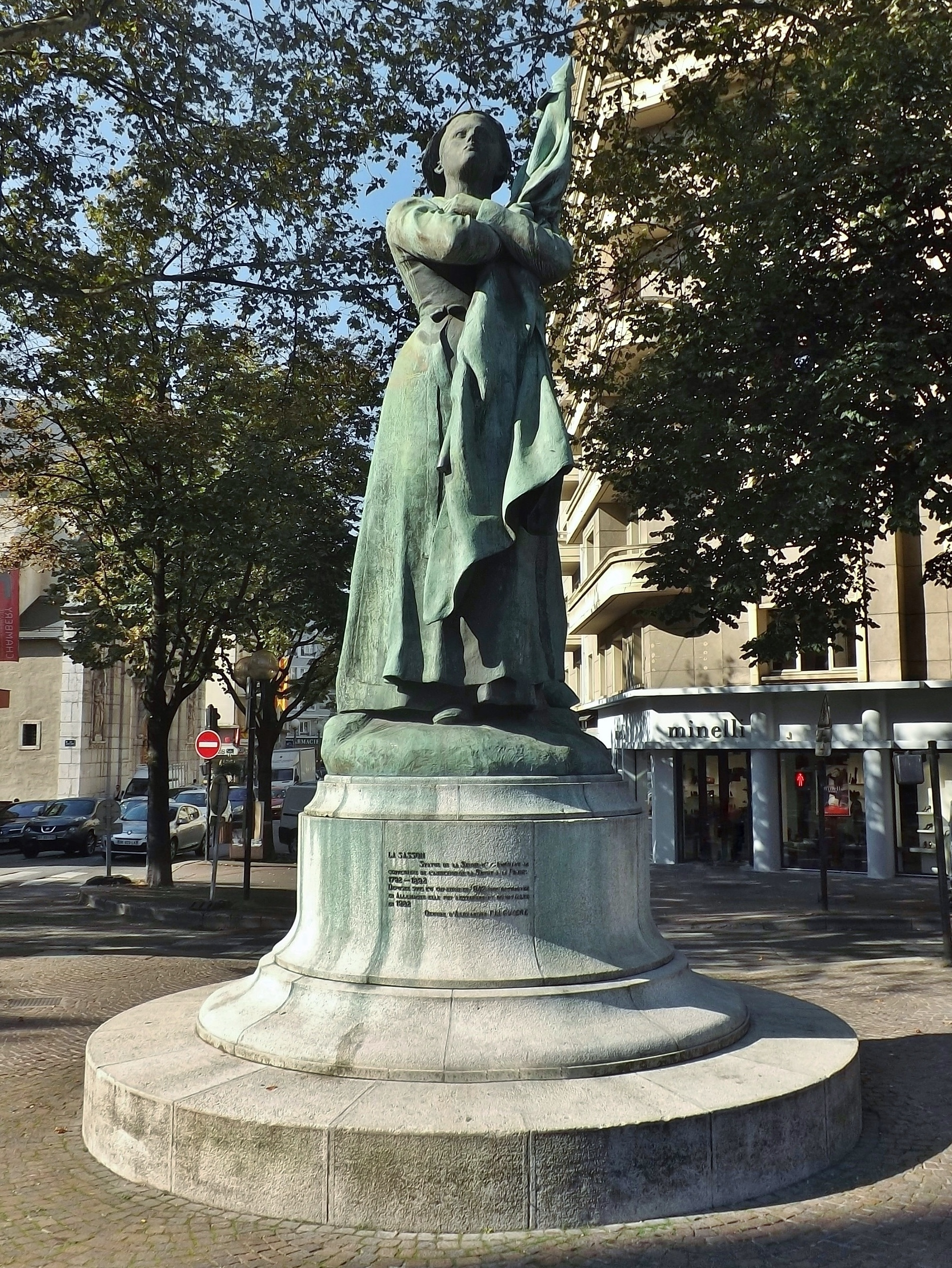
A photo of La Sasson, a statue located in Chambèry inaugurated in 1892 by President of the Republic Sadi Carnot in order to commemorate the first annexation of Savoy to France in November 1792, during the French Revolution.

Throughout the years various claims which could be identified as French irredentism (French: l'irrédentisme français) originated to promote the annexation of majority French-speaking territories, adjacent territories and strategically important territories to the nation of France. French irredentism focused on the territories held by modern-day Germany and Italy, with an irredentist narrative gaining traction between the 19th and 20th Century. Unlike irredentism in some other nations, French irredentism is largely episodic.

== Definition ==
In a general sense, "irredentism" is a term that explains the dynamic between two nations, one of which, the one practicing irredentism, desire to annex the territory of the other nation on the basis of ethnic reasons. It differs itself from revanchism in its dynamic due to revanchism being focuses on the will to reclaim a territory, currently within the possession of another nation, which was once part of said revanchist nation.

France rarely experienced irredentist tendencies, and only did so episodically. Historically French nationalism was not focused on French identity and ethnic unity, and only did so in specific episodes.

== History ==
=== Origins and the idea of the Natural borders of France ===
The origins of French irredentism are debated and can be tied to the idea of the natural borders of France, which, according to some historians, including Norman J. G. Pounds and Pernot François, was first theorized by Cardinal Richelieu in 1642 within the context of an apocryphal statement. However, according to other historians, such as Peter Sahlins and Lucien Zeller, Richelieu had not even wrote such statement himself, and instead it had been written by a Jesuit Father Philippe Labbe and that the statement itself had not called for a "restoration of Gaul" to its natural borders (French: frontières naturelles), but rather, this was a historiographic interpretation given in the following centuries to such doctrine for political scopes. The goals to pursue a Rhine-to-the-Alps border, at the time, was not pursued in a systematic matter by the Kingdom of France, and was rather anachronistic. What has been historically proven was that the doctrine showcased within the statement called for securing fortified positions on rivers and within strategic places of central Europe (including Metz and Breisach) as to avoid being encircled by the Habsburgs and their domains and serve French interests in central Europe during the Thirty Years' War.

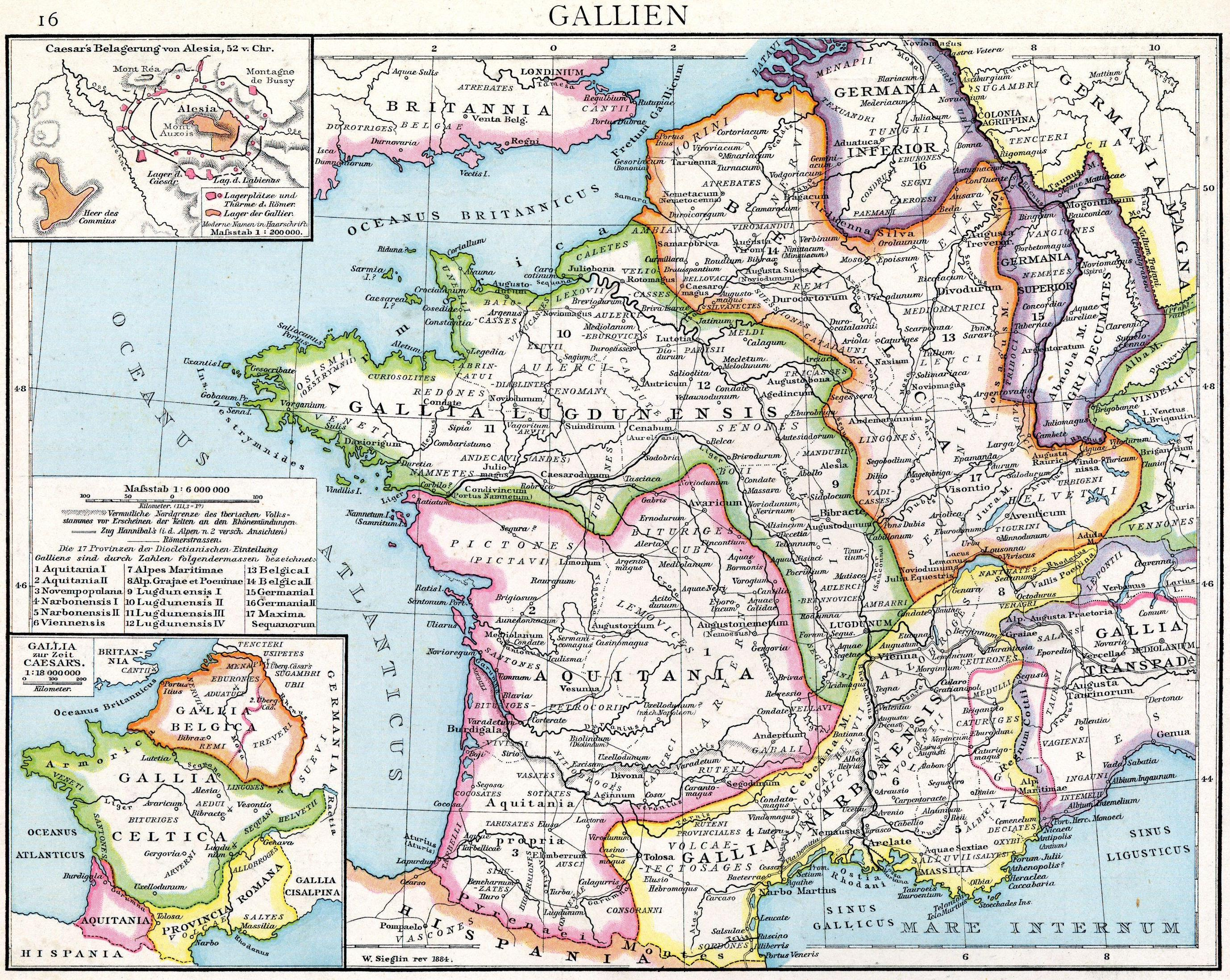
Old historic map of Gaul under Roman domination, taken from the Historical Atlas of Droysen, 1886.

Modern era historian Gaston Zeller 's analysis of the topic aligned with Sahlins' idea that looking at the idea of French natural borders in the early modern era and identifying them as irredentistic nationalistic ideas similar to those following the French Revolution was a form of contemporary teleological reading. The French monarchy had portrayed itself as a natural successor to Roman Gaul in the past as well as embracing the legacy of Clovis and Charlemagne symbolically, and such model were used as to justify past territorial expanionism in the past during the Grand Siècle, however they were never adopted as systematic policies for future gains and were not a full representation in the Kingdom's own political agenda.

==== 18th Century France to Napoleonic France ====
Ideas related to the myth of Gaul continued onto the 18th Century and even became known and theorized outside of France itself, with the Prussian Anacharsis Cloots releasing Wishes of a Gallophile (French: Voeux d'un gallophile), in favor of French annexation of the Left Bank of the Rhine.

In the immediate aftermath of the initial phases of the French Revolution the revolutionaries, as stated on 22 May 1790, renounced wars of conquest, and thus expansionistic goals that the Ancien Régime still retained, regardless of intent. Figures like Lazare Carnot would continue to insist, even in latter phases of the Revolution, that pushing upon "natural borders", especially in the Rhineland, was unnecessary and dangerous.

Historical analysis, including those of Jordan R. Hayworth and Peter Sahlin, however, state that the actual origin of French irredentism and French natural borders as a state-pursued policy, despite initial rejection of such policy from within, dates back to the French Revolution out of necessity to have a strong natural border protected by natural barriers after the weakening of the French military during the revolution and the ongoing external threats by neighbouring nations, with once again, myths such as the one of Roman Gaul and Charlemagne being brought up as a symbolic justification for irredentism.

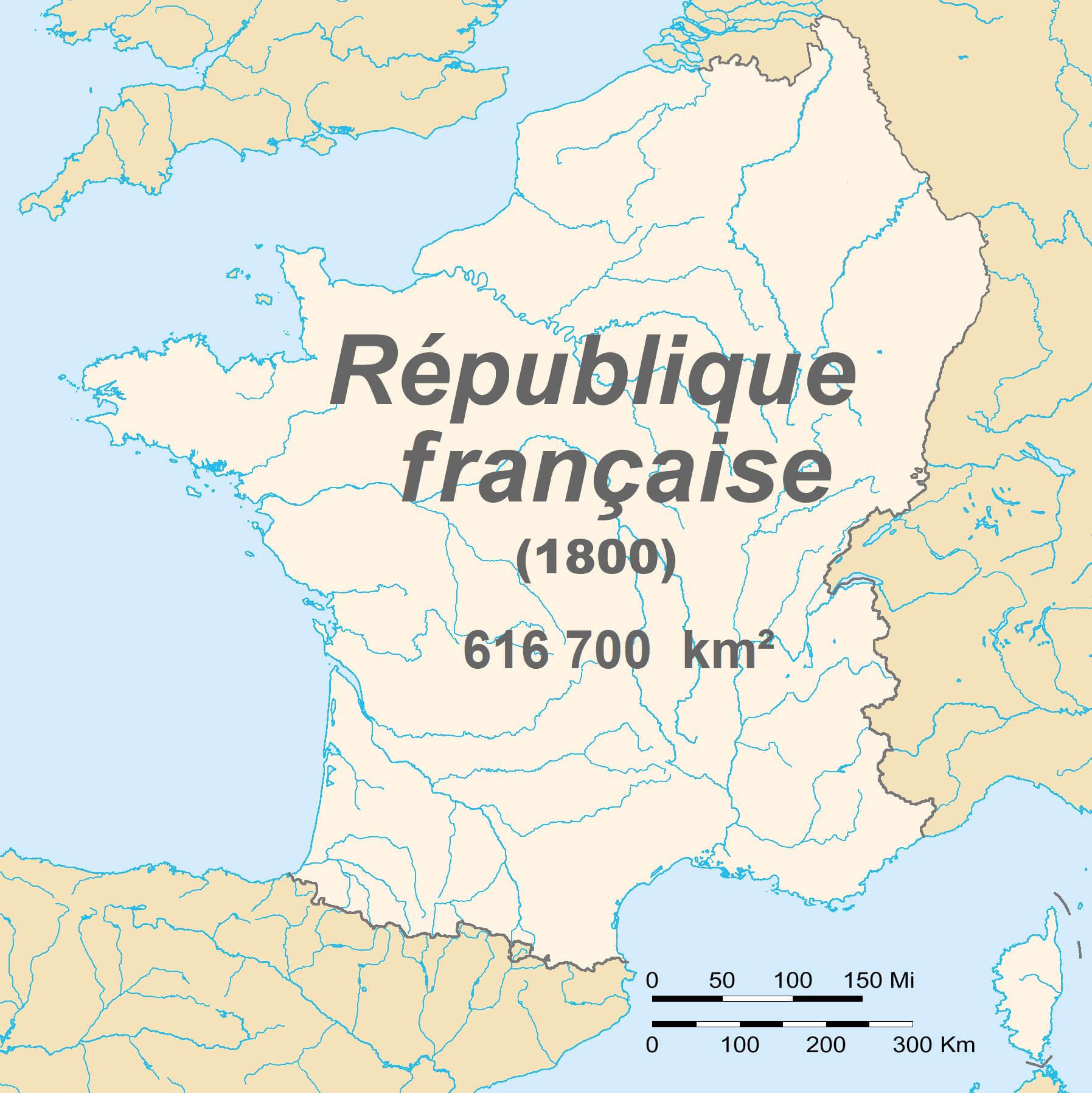
The French First Republic in 1800. The borders of France then corresponded closely to the 'natural borders' as defined by the French revolutionaries.

Initially, the focus was merely defensive, in order to protect the gains made in the French Revolution, however, French operations soon enough turned offensive, and thus did their claims onto Savoy, Low Countries and the Rhineland. Once conquered these territories were not merely occupied but became integral parts of France, with law and order monopolized by French authorities and administrative areas being created, putting the policy into actual practice. These annexations also were justified through a sense of new found nationalism, and the general public started to adopt irredentist and nationalistic ideals to a wider scale in a way never seen before. The idea that a set of territories were rightfully to be annexed to France based on French identity and right to expand there started to be popularized in both the public and the institutions, building the basis of the idea of an irredentist "rightful territory" that would later develop in Napoleonic times and diversify from merely being a strategical policy and transforming into an ideological one.

Specific geographic places such as the Pyrenees, the Alps and the Rhine river remained well established geographical and historical claims beyond the ancien régime's borders during the Napoleonic times and Napoleon went even beyond such theorized borders.

=== Systematic irredentism ===
==== 19th century ====
The idea of that the Rhine was the "natural eastward border" of France started to be less tied to the Gaullic Myth following the fall of Napoleon and into the 1840s, and instead, it started to have a more personal, national, contemporary, nationalistic and non merely strategic tone. The claim was used as to rally support to the government by the prime minister at the time, Adolphe Thiers, but it never led to a systematic agenda. So whilst the question of the Rhine border had transformed into a national one, it had not become an active irredentist claim unlike back in the time of the Revolutionary period where it was not merely a question of national unity but rather a piece of the government's own agenda (which was actually pursued).

Map of Italy in 1843, showcasing the dates in which countries either become a dominion of the House of Savoy, or were ceded by it. The regions of Nice and Savoy showcased in the map were ceded to France in 1860, during the Treaty of Turin, and were a former French claim.

Most territorial claims by France in the 19th century or even the 20th century were not tied to language, ethnicity and historical claims unlike German and Italian irredentism but they instead were based on an elective conception of nationality. There are a few exceptions however, which can be classified as irredentism, and in the 1800s that exception was the Second French Empire attitude towards Savoy and Nice, which led to the Treaty of Turin in 1860. This was a claim based on identity, national unity, linguistics and historical claims, thus, irredentist, with the nation systematically pursuing such claims in its agenda even before the treaty. Various historians, including Paul Guichonnet highlighted that social, linguistic, and cultural affinities were used in an irredentist manner before and after the treaty as to justify it. The annexation was complete and even supported by the nation that had given up the territory, the Kingdom of Sardinia-Piedmont, as well as his king, King Victor Emanuel II, which supported French irredentist claims in exchange of Napoleon III's support of Italian unification.

Only two areas of the former "historical Savoy" were left out of the Treaty of Turin, the towns of Tende and La Brigue. These territories remained Italian due to King Emanuel II request, stating that they were part of the royal hunting ground and thus could not be handed over to the French. However, the real reason these towns were not handed over were due to their strategic position which could have been useful in the event of a Franco-Italian war in the future, something Italian generals and officials within the army warned and pushed Emanuel II to consider. While the situation fluctuated along the lines of the evolution of the French-Italian relations over the years, local and French regret over not annexing the towns and the adjacent territories grew over the years on the basis of French identity, with French newspaper lamenting it on irredentistic grounds. Such irredentist sentiments would linger up until the end of World War II, following the results of the Treaty of Paris.

Other territorial claims started to be prevalent following the Franco-Prussian War, which ended in 1871. Territorial ambitions to regain the lost territory of Alsacce-Lorraine became part of the public discourse and the political agenda of France. However, such territorial ambitions were revanchistic and not irredentist, as they were directed towards a directly lost territory and do not fit the definition.

==== 20th century ====
During World War II resentment grew between the Kingdom of Italy and the Third French Republic and its Allied-aligned successors due to the Italian entry in WW2 and the Italian occupation of French territories during the war, such as their occupation of Nice and Corsica. This resentment was from both the French officials in exile and also the population residing in occupied zones, with a group of resistance forming in 1943 within them, including in La Brigue. This group's goal was to await liberation and the expulsion of the local Carabinieri before expelling all Italian residents residing in their respective areas of operation and then opt for a French-oriented redrawal of the Italian border. The movement was led by Vincent Paschetta, Louis Fulconis, Joseph Aubert and Léonard Wirz, and had pursued such goals up until September 1944 when an Allied advance towards the occupied areas was temporarily stopped. After such date the focus remained French accession. In Tende and Brigue alone the adherence to the movement amounted to 1200 members. Members of the resistance group sent a letter directly to Charles de Gaulle, explaining in detail why the towns which were left out of the Treaty of Turin should be annexed and why further adjustments on the border should have occurred.

De Gaulle's ambitions however did not stop to annexing Tende and La Brigue, and as early as in October 1943, one month after the Armistice of Cassibile, he expressed France's territorial ambitions in Italy, and then vocalized them in an official statement held in Algiers where he supported the annexation of territories in the Roya Valley, Susa valley, province of Imperia, parts of the province of Savona (up to Pietra Ligure), Aosta Valley, La Brigue, Tende and other adjacent territories on the basis of national security as well as the "interest of the local population" and the unification of the local French-speaking communities into France and alleged liberation from italianization. While not publicly stated, some sources suggest that ambitions went as far as annexing Turin. French irredentist ideals seems to have had some support Winston Churchill, who addressed it in the Tehran Conference by showcasing and incorporated such wills in his Italy plan.

After the new Italian government led by Pietro Badoglio and King Victor Emanuel III was recognized by the Allied Powers, France's claims on Italy started to lose significant support from its allies and France's political position was severely weakened. This led Georges Bidault and Maurice Couve de Murville to tell Charles de Gaulle to opt for a diplomatic solution rather than an irredentist attitude, however, De Gaulle openly refused. According to Charles de Gaulle, Italy had to be punished for their alliance with Nazi Germany by demilitarizing their border with France and annexing bordering territories in the alpine border regions on the basis of the French-speaking demographic presence in the area and concepts of national unity and utility of "rightful French lands". In November 1944, according to French secret services information, if a referendum was to take place following the war in the Ligurian riviera, they estimated at least 90% of the people would vote in favor.

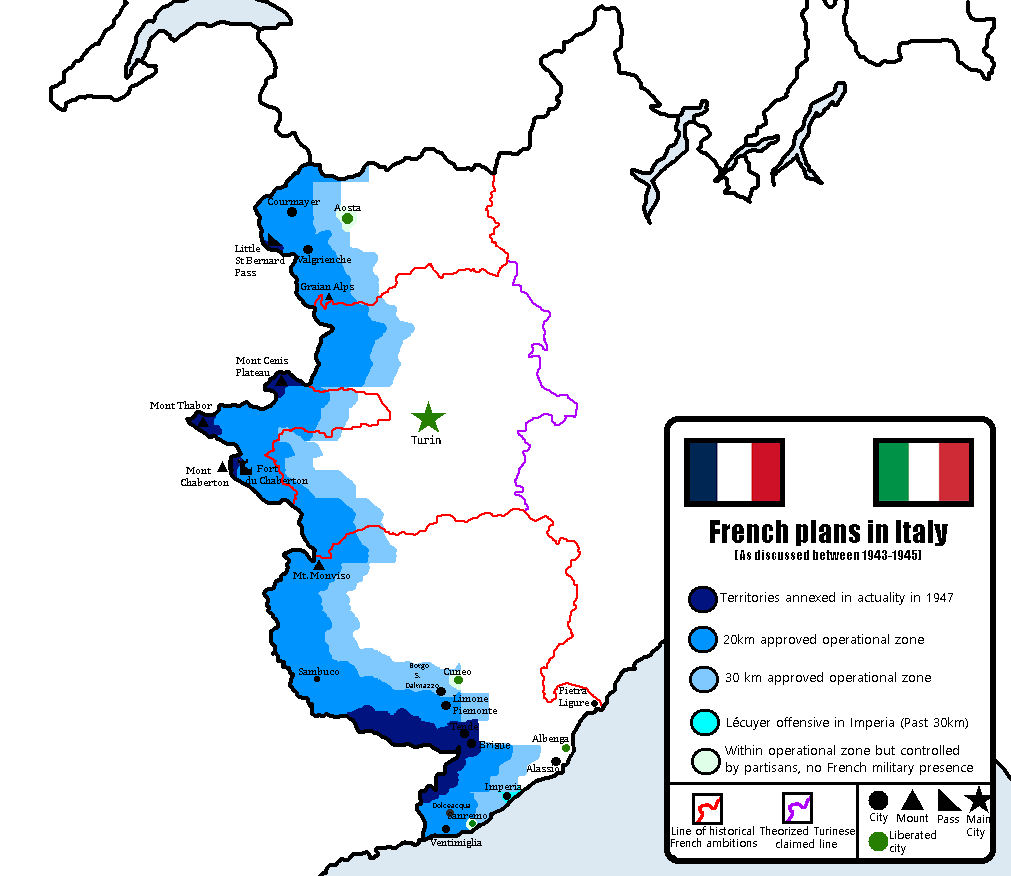
A map showcasing French ambitions, operations and plans within the region.

On 23 December 1944 the National Defense Committee decided to create the Alpine Army Detachment and planned to use the eventual defeat of the Germans as an opportunity to militarily occupy areas claimed by France in Italy. Charles de Gaulle believed that once stationed, it would have been difficult for other nations, including Italy and possibly France's own allies, to kick France outside of Italy and thus they would have been able to secure and annex the occupied territories into France. This strategy had already been laid out in late 1943 by the Comité Français de Libération Nationale. At the same time, in Aosta Valley and adjacent areas, Operation Mont Blanc had begun, giving funds to Cesare Olietti and other local pro-French partisans and civilians to promote the idea of French annexation in the region and sway the public, even through the use of lobbying directly from the French secret services, to join France.

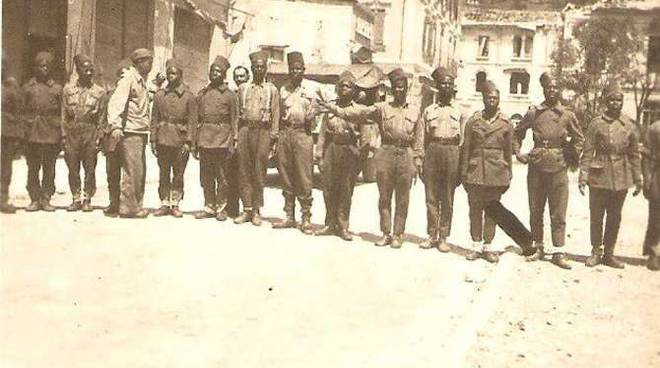
Senegalese French colonial troops were stationed in the city of Imperia under the orders of occupation.

The French in 1945 were allowed to enter by the Allied command up until 20 kilometers within French territory in order to coordinate local resistance against the Italian Social Republic, and soon after the French were allowed to occupy territories up to 30 kilometers from the Italian border. The French occupied cities such as Ventimiglia and Imperia (the latter laying over the 30 kilometers limit) and started to establish local administrations, border control facilities, border guards and military presence, preparing for annexation.

In the immediate aftermath of World War II general Harold Alexander ordered the creation of an Alpine, and specifically Aostan, military government as to better manage the territory and asked French general Paul-André Doyen to retreat his troops and withdraw to the borders prior to the Italian entry in World War II, however, under the orders of Charles de Gaulle, Doyen refused and threatened he would impede the creation of a military government under official French orders. U.S. president Harry S. Truman then called Charles de Gaulle, threatening him that he would cut all supplies towards France aside from rations if he had not retreated, forcing Charles de Gaulle to retreat aside from some key territories, including Le Brigue and Tende.

After the war, La Brigue and Tende were annexed to France following the Treaty of Paris of 1947 and referendums held in the region with widespread public support. All other territories not included were left by the French.

== See also ==
- Italian irredentism
- Natural borders of France
- Pan-Germanism
