= Natural border =

Boundaries that follow geographic features such as rivers or mountains

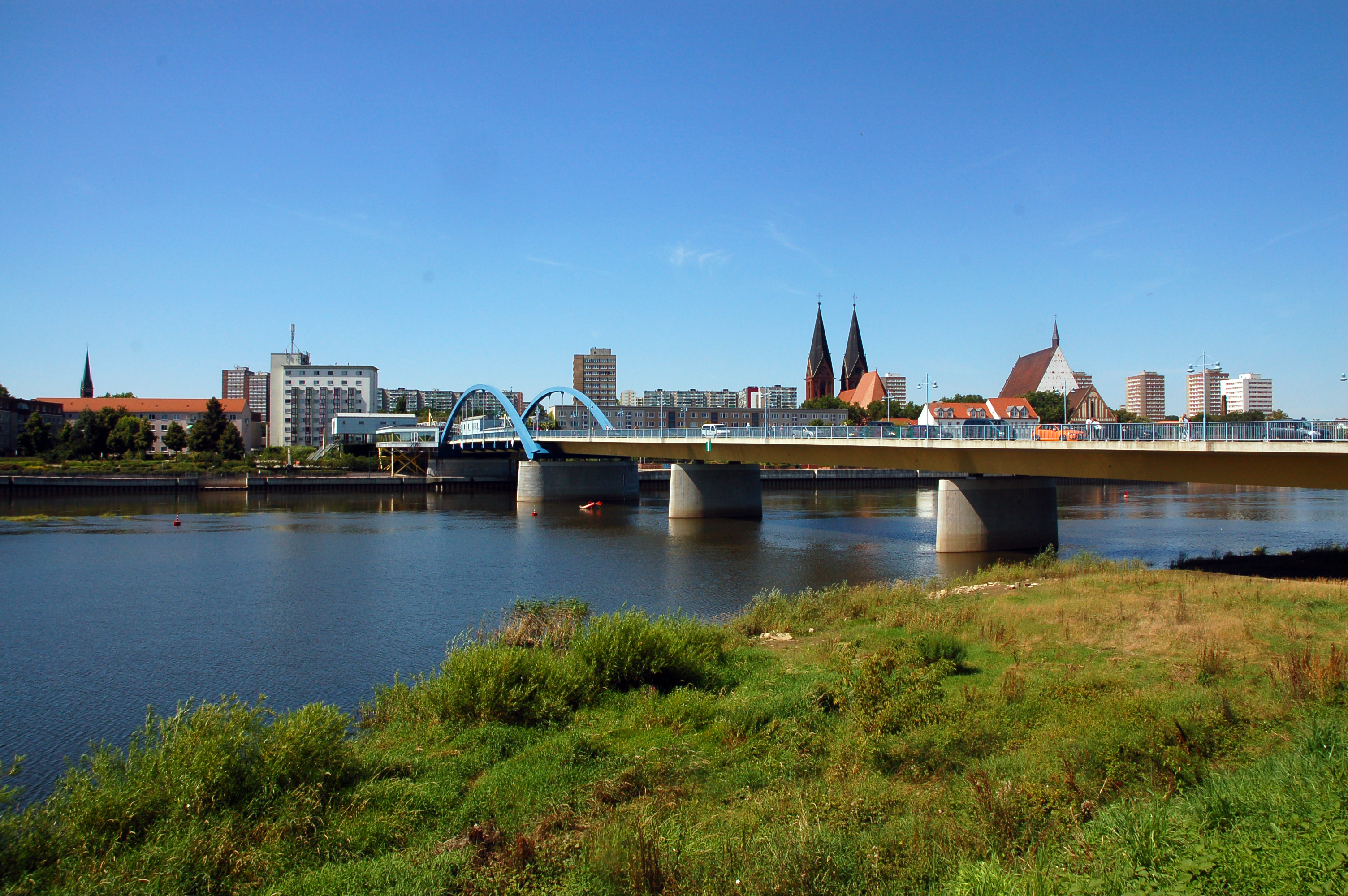
The Oder, a natural border between Poland and Germany

A natural border is a border between states or their subdivisions which is concomitant with natural formations such as rivers or mountain ranges. The "doctrine of natural boundaries" developed in Western culture in the 18th century being based upon the "natural" ideas of Jean-Jacques Rousseau and developing concepts of nationalism. The similar concept in China developed earlier from natural zones of control.

Natural borders have historically been strategically useful because they are easily defended. Natural borders remain meaningful in modern warfare even though military technology and engineering have somewhat reduced their strategic value.

Expanding until natural borders are reached, and maintaining those borders once conquered, have been a major policy goal for a number of states. For example, the Roman Republic, and later, the Roman Empire expanded continuously until it reached certain natural borders: first the Alps, later the Rhine river, the Danube river and the Sahara desert. From the Middle Ages onwards until the 19th century, France sought to expand its borders towards the Alps, the Pyrenees, and the Rhine River.

Natural borders can be a source of territorial disputes when they shift. One such example is the Rio Grande, which defines part of the border between the United States and Mexico, whose movement has led to multiple conflicts.

Natural borders are not to be confused with landscape borders, which are also geographical features that demarcate political boundaries. Although landscape borders, like natural borders, also take forms of forests and bodies of water, they are manmade instead of natural. Installing a landscape border, usually motivated by demarcating treaty-designated political boundaries, goes against nature by modifying the borderland's natural geography. For one, China's Song Dynasty built an extensive defensive forest in its northern border to thwart the nomadic Khitan people.

== Criticism ==
In Chapter IV of his 1916 book The New Europe: Essays in Reconstruction, British historian Arnold J. Toynbee criticized the concept of natural borders. Specifically, Toynbee criticized this concept as providing a justification for launching additional wars so that countries can attain their natural borders. Toynbee also pointed out how once a country attained one set of natural borders, it could subsequently aim to attain another, further set of natural borders; for instance, the German Empire set its western natural border at the Vosges Mountains in 1871 but during World War I, some Germans began to advocate for even more western natural borders—specifically ones that extend all of the way up to Calais and the English Channel—conveniently justifying the permanent German retention of those Belgian and French territories that Germany had just conquered during World War I. As an alternative to the idea of natural borders, Toynbee proposes making free trade, partnership, and cooperation between various countries with interconnected economies considerably easier so that there would be less need for countries to expand even further—whether to their natural borders or otherwise. In addition, Toynbee advocated making national borders based more on the principle of national self-determination—as in, based on which country the people in a particular area or territory actually wanted to live in.

== In the United States ==
There are many notable natural borders of the United States, with most consisting of rivers, and a few examples of mountains. The U.S. has 5 true natural state borders within the continental U.S. (true natural borders are where 3 rivers meet up at a single point, 2 rivers, an invisible line drawn, would not count as a true natural border) (true natural border can mean mountains, but this never occurs in the U.S.)

The list of true natural borders are listed near the bottom of the page: List of tripoints of U.S. states with each one starting with the note, "One of 5..." on the note section on the right.

Most U.S. islands are true natural border as well.

== See also ==
- Natural borders of France
