= Border =

Geographic boundaries of political entity

Borders are generally defined as geographical boundaries, imposed either by features such as oceans and terrain, or by political entities such as governments, sovereign states, federated states, and other subnational entities. Political borders can be established through warfare, colonization, or mutual agreements between the political entities that reside in those areas.

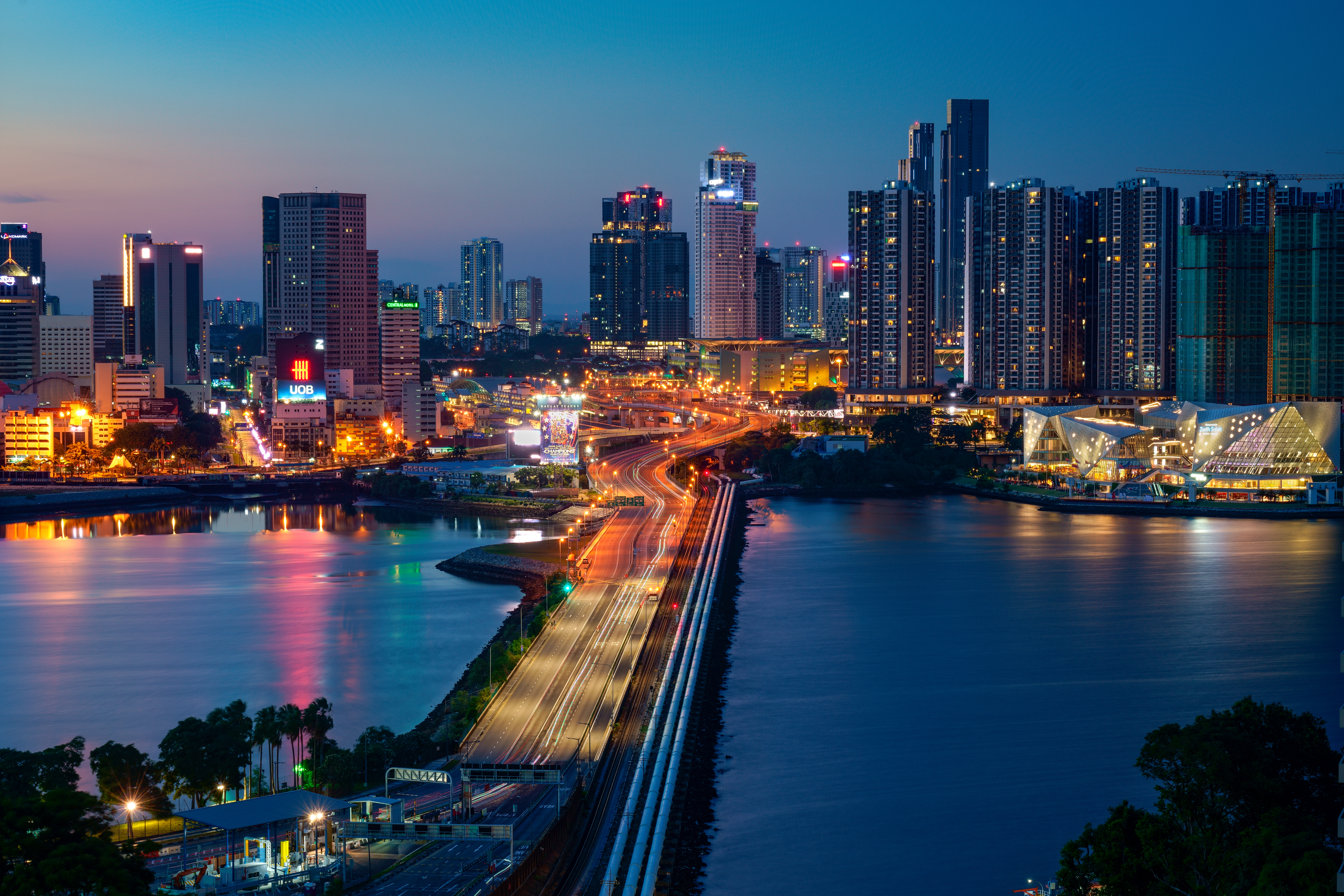
Johor–Singapore Causeway and Johor Bahru skyline. This causeway across the Strait of Johor is among the world's busiest border crossings.

Some borders—such as most states' internal administrative borders, or inter-state borders within the Schengen Area—are open and completely unguarded. Most external political borders are partially or fully controlled, and may be crossed legally only at designated border checkpoints; adjacent border zones may also be controlled. For the purposes of border control, airports and seaports are also classed as borders. Most countries have some form of border control to regulate or limit the movement of people, animals, and goods into and out of the country. Under international law, each country is generally permitted to legislate the conditions that have to be met in order to cross its borders, and to prevent people from crossing its borders in violation of those laws.

Buffer zones may be set up on borders between belligerent entities to lower the risk of escalation. While border refers to the boundary itself, the area around the border is called the frontier.

== History ==
In the pre-modern world, the term border was vague and could refer to either side of the boundary, thus it was necessary to specify part of it with borderline or borderland. During the medieval period the government's control frequently diminished the further people got from the capital. Therefore borderland (especially impassable terrain) attracted many outlaws, as they often found sympathizers.

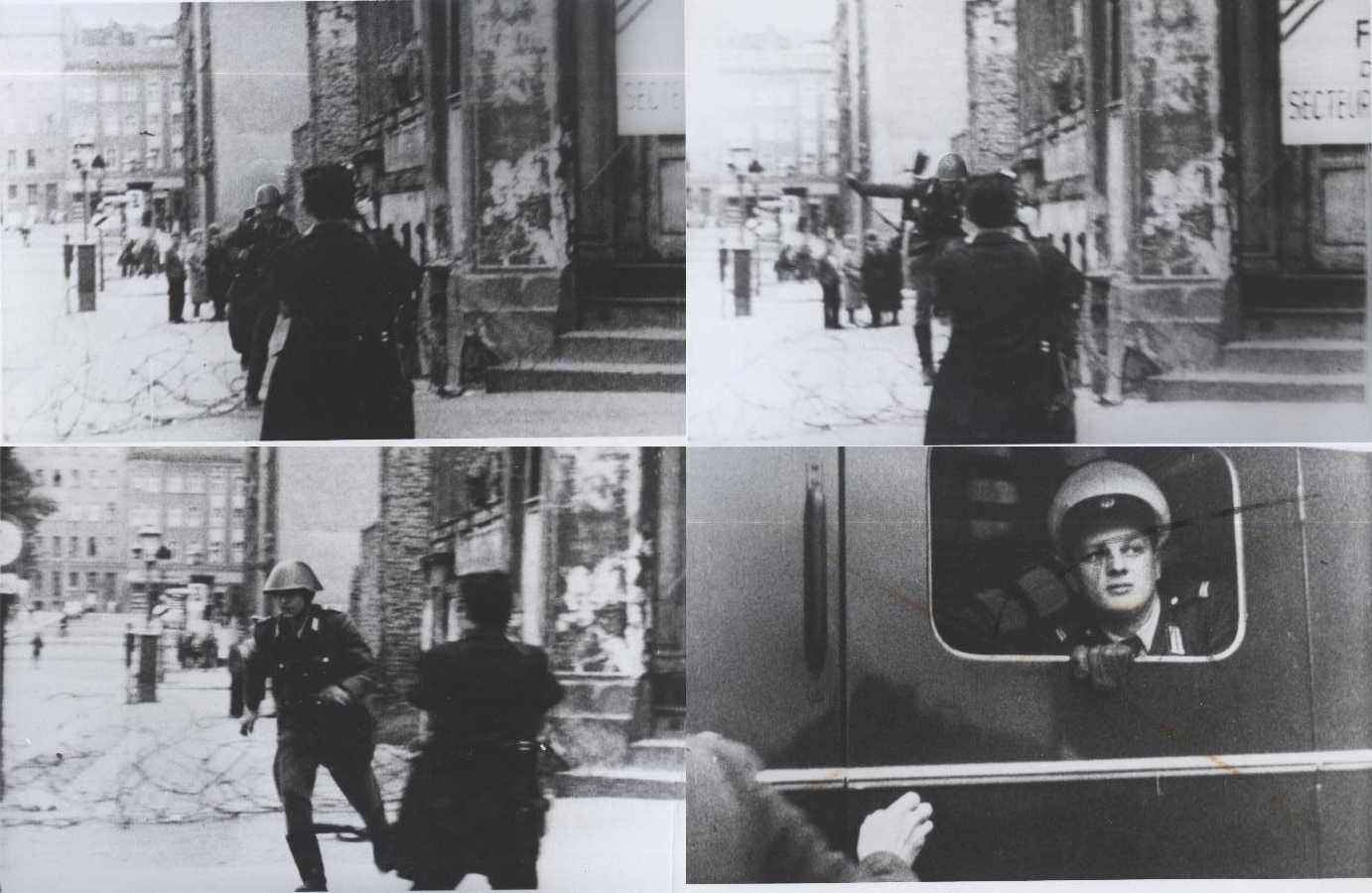
Konrad Schumann, an East German border guard, fleeing East Germany towards West Germany in 1962

In the past, many borders were not clearly defined lines; instead there were often intervening areas often claimed and fought over by both sides, sometimes called marchlands. Special cases in modern times were the Saudi Arabian–Iraqi neutral zone from 1922 to 1991 and the Saudi Arabian–Kuwaiti neutral zone from 1922 until 1970. In modern times, marchlands have been replaced by clearly defined and demarcated borders.

== Classification ==
=== Political borders ===
Political borders are imposed on the world through human agency. That means that although a political border may follow a river or mountain range, such a feature does not automatically define the political border, even though it may be a major physical barrier to crossing.

Political borders are often classified by whether or not they follow conspicuous physical features on the earth. William Miles said that Britain and France traced close to 40% of the entire length of the world's international boundaries.

=== Natural borders ===
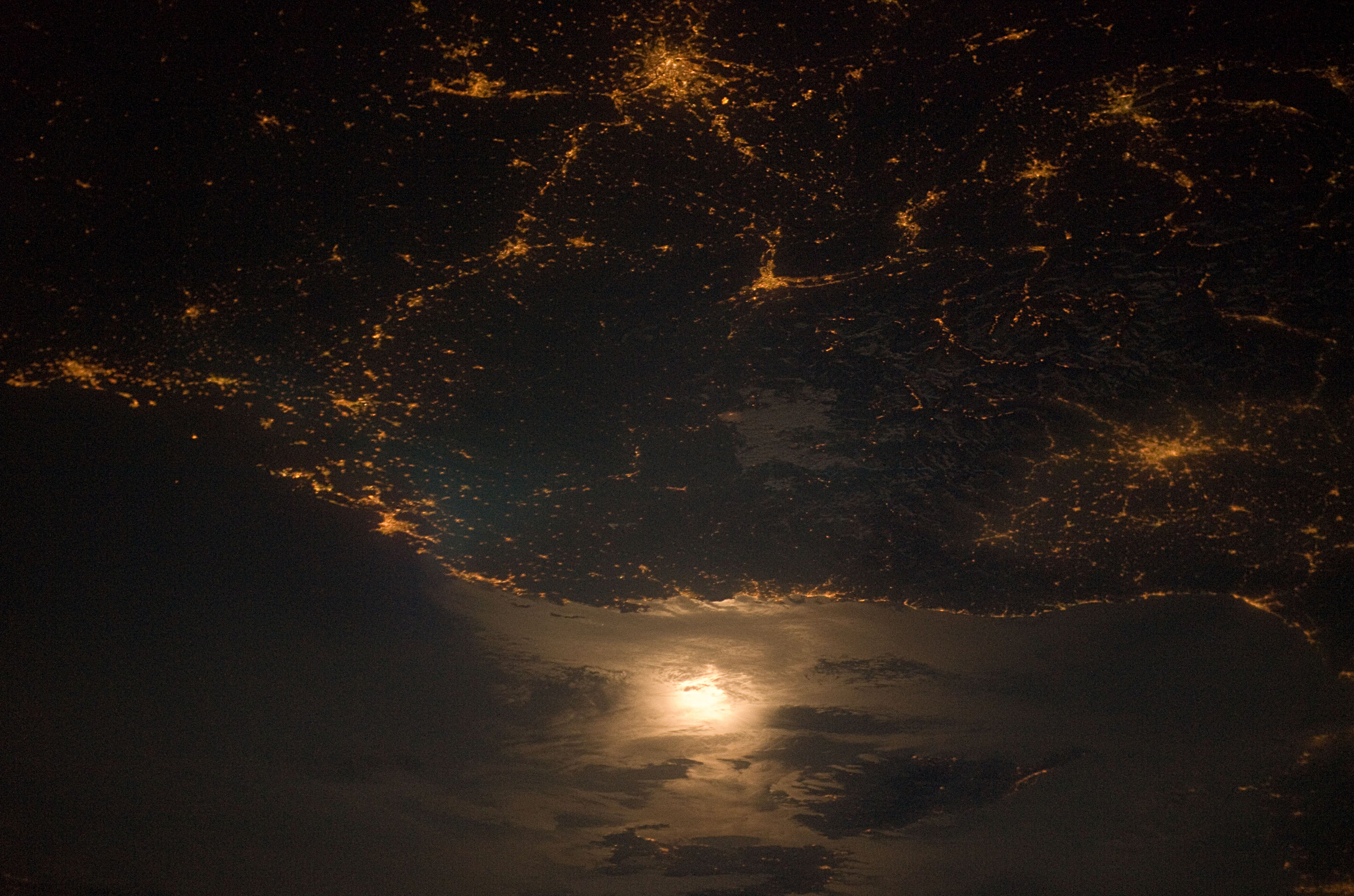
A photograph of the France–Italy border at night. The southwestern end of the Alps separates the two countries.

Natural borders are geographical features that present natural obstacles to communication and transport. Existing political borders are often a formalization of such historical, natural obstacles.

Some geographical features that often constitute natural borders are:

- Oceans: oceans create very costly natural borders. Very few countries span more than one continent. Only very large and resource-rich states are able to sustain the costs of governance across oceans for longer periods of time.
- Rivers: Some political borders have been formalized along natural borders formed by rivers. If a precise line is desired, it is often drawn along the thalweg, the deepest line along the river.
- Lakes: larger lakes create natural borders.
- Forests: denser jungles or forests can create strong natural borders.
- Mountain ranges: Many nations have their political borders defined along mountain ranges, often along a drainage divide.

Throughout history, technological advances have reduced the costs of transport and communication across the natural borders. That has reduced the significance of natural borders over time. As a result, political borders that have been formalized more recently, such as those in Africa or Americas, typically conform less to natural borders than very old borders, such as those in Europe or Asia, do.

=== Landscape borders ===
A landscape border is a mixture of political and natural borders. One example is the defensive forest created by China's Song dynasty in the eleventh century. Such a border is political in the sense that it is human-demarcated, usually through a treaty. However, a landscape border is not demarcated by fences and walls but instead landscape features such as forests and water bodies. It is different from a natural border, however, in the sense that the border landscape is not natural but human-engineered. Such a landscape usually differs from the borderland's natural geography and its building requires tremendous human labour and financial investment.

=== Geometric borders ===
Geometric boundaries are formed by straight lines (such as lines of longitude), or occasionally arcs (such as lines of latitude or the Pennsylvania/Delaware border), regardless of the physical and cultural features of the area. Such political boundaries are often found around the states that developed out of colonial holdings, such as in North America, Africa and the Middle East. The Canada–United States border follows the 49th parallel for roughly 2,175 miles (3,500 km) from Lake of the Woods (Ontario and Minnesota) west to the Pacific Ocean.

=== Fiat borders ===
A generalization of the idea of geometric borders is the idea of fiat boundaries by which is meant any sort of boundary that does not track an underlying bona fide physical discontinuity (fiat, Latin for "let it be done", a decision). Fiat boundaries are typically the product of human demarcation, such as in demarcating electoral districts or postal districts.

=== Relic borders ===
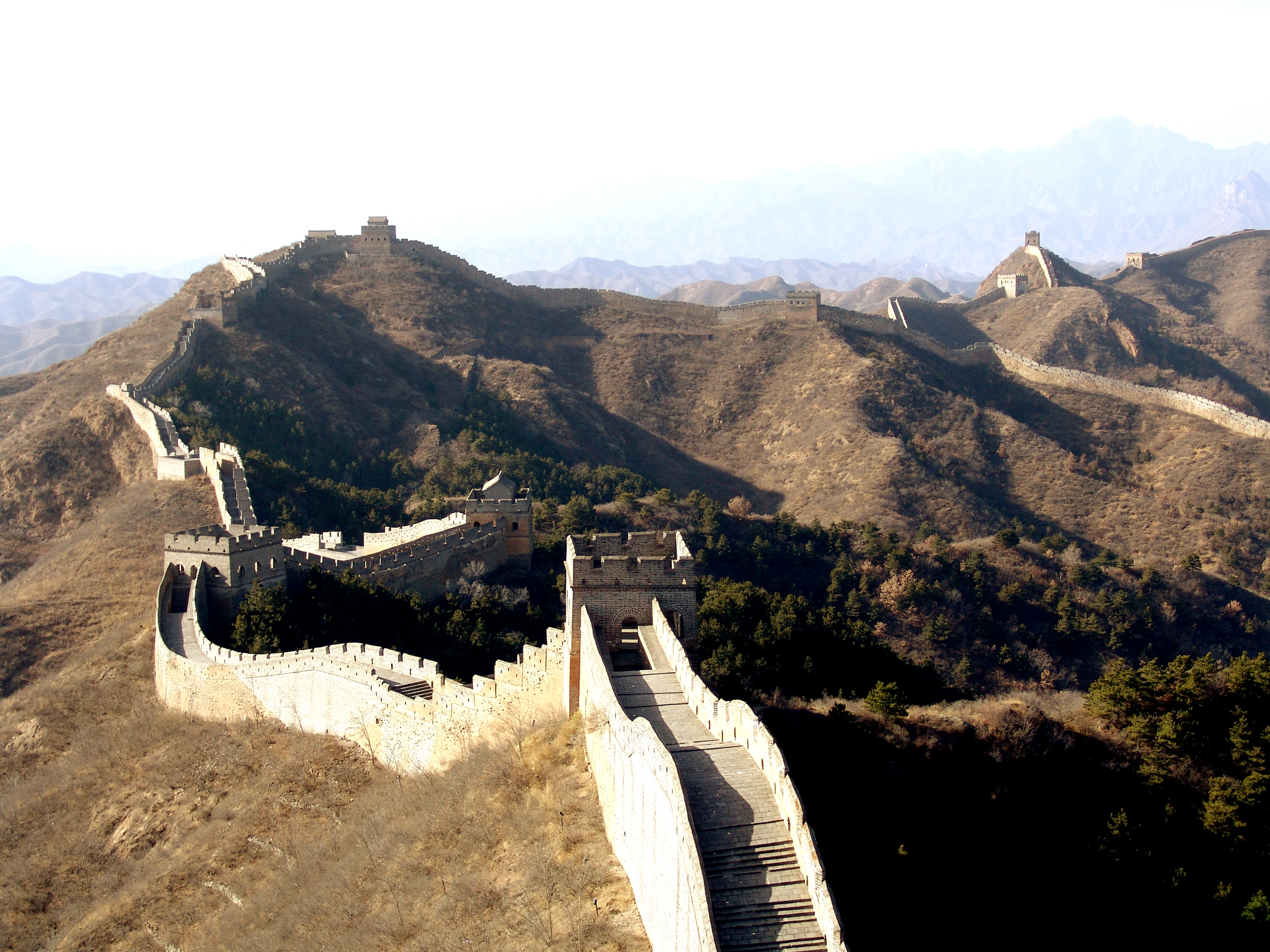
The purpose of the Great Wall of China was to stop people and militaries from crossing the northern border of China. Today it is a relic border.

A relic border is a former boundary, which may no longer be a legal boundary at all. However, the former presence of the boundary can still be seen in the landscape. For instance, the boundary between East and West Germany is no longer an international boundary, but it can still be seen because of historical markers on the landscape; it remains a cultural and economic demarcation in Germany. Other examples include the Demilitarized Zone between North and South Vietnam (defunct since 1975) and the border between North and South Yemen (defunct since 1990). Occasionally a relic border is reconstituted in some form, for example the border between British Somaliland and Italian Somaliland ceased to exist when the two colonies merged to form the independent state of Somalia in 1960, however when the former British Somaliland declared independence in 1991 it claimed the former British-Italian line as its eastern border.

=== Lines of control ===
A line of control (LoC) refers to a militarized buffer border between two or more nations that has yet to achieve permanent border status. LoC borders are typically under military control and are not recognized as an official international border. Formally known as a cease-fire line, an LoC was first created with the Simla Agreement between India and Pakistan. Similar to a cease-fire line, an LoC is typically the result of war, military stalemates and unresolved land ownership conflict.

=== Maritime borders ===
A maritime border is a division enclosing an area in the ocean where a nation has exclusive rights over the mineral and biological resources, encompassing maritime features, limits and zones. Maritime borders represent the jurisdictional borders of a maritime nation and are recognized by the United Nations Convention on the Law of the Sea.

Maritime borders exist in the context of territorial waters, contiguous zones, and exclusive economic zones; however, the terminology does not encompass lake or river boundaries, which are considered within the context of land boundaries.

Some maritime borders have remained indeterminate despite efforts to clarify them. This is explained by an array of factors, some of which illustrate regional problems.

=== Airspace borders ===
Airspace is the atmosphere located within a country's controlled international and maritime borders. All sovereign countries hold the right to regulate and protect air space under the international law of Air sovereignty. The horizontal boundaries of airspace are similar to the policies of "high seas" in maritime law. Airspace extends 12 nautical miles from the coast of a country and it holds responsibility for protecting its own airspace unless under NATO peacetime protection. With international agreement a country can assume the responsibility of protecting or controlling the atmosphere over International Airspaces such as the Pacific Ocean. The vertical boundaries of airspace are not officially set or regulated internationally. However, there is a general agreement of vertical airspace ending at the point of the Kármán line. The Kármán line is a peak point at the altitude of 62 mi (100 km) above the Earth's surface, setting a boundary between the atmosphere (airspace) and outer space (which is governed by space law).

=== Frontier ===
The frontier is a border that is open-ended to one side, identifying an expanding borderland to one side.

This type of border can be fairly abstract and has been identified as a particular state of mind for human activity. As such frontiers have been applied to borderlands identifying and claiming them as terra nullius, such as Marie Byrd Land in West Antarctica, the only territory in Antarctica unclaimed by any sovereign nation.

== Types of border regulation ==
In places where smuggling, migration, and infiltration are a problem, many countries fortify borders with fences and barriers, and institute formal border control procedures. These can extend inland, as in the United States where the U.S. Customs and Border Protection service has jurisdiction to operate up to 100 miles from any land or sea boundary. On the other hand, some borders are merely signposted. This is common in countries within the European Schengen Area and on rural sections of the Canada–United States border. Borders may even be completely unmarked, typically in remote or forested regions; such borders are often described as "porous". Migration within territorial borders, and outside of them, represented an old and established pattern of movement in African countries, in seeking work and food, and to maintain ties with kin who had moved across the previously porous borders of their homelands. When the colonial frontiers were drawn, Western countries attempted to obtain a monopoly on the recruitment of labor in many African countries, which altered the practical and institutional context in which the old migration patterns had been followed, and some might argue, are still followed today. The frontiers were particularly porous for the physical movement of migrants, and people living in borderlands easily maintained transnational cultural and social networks.

=== Regulated borders ===
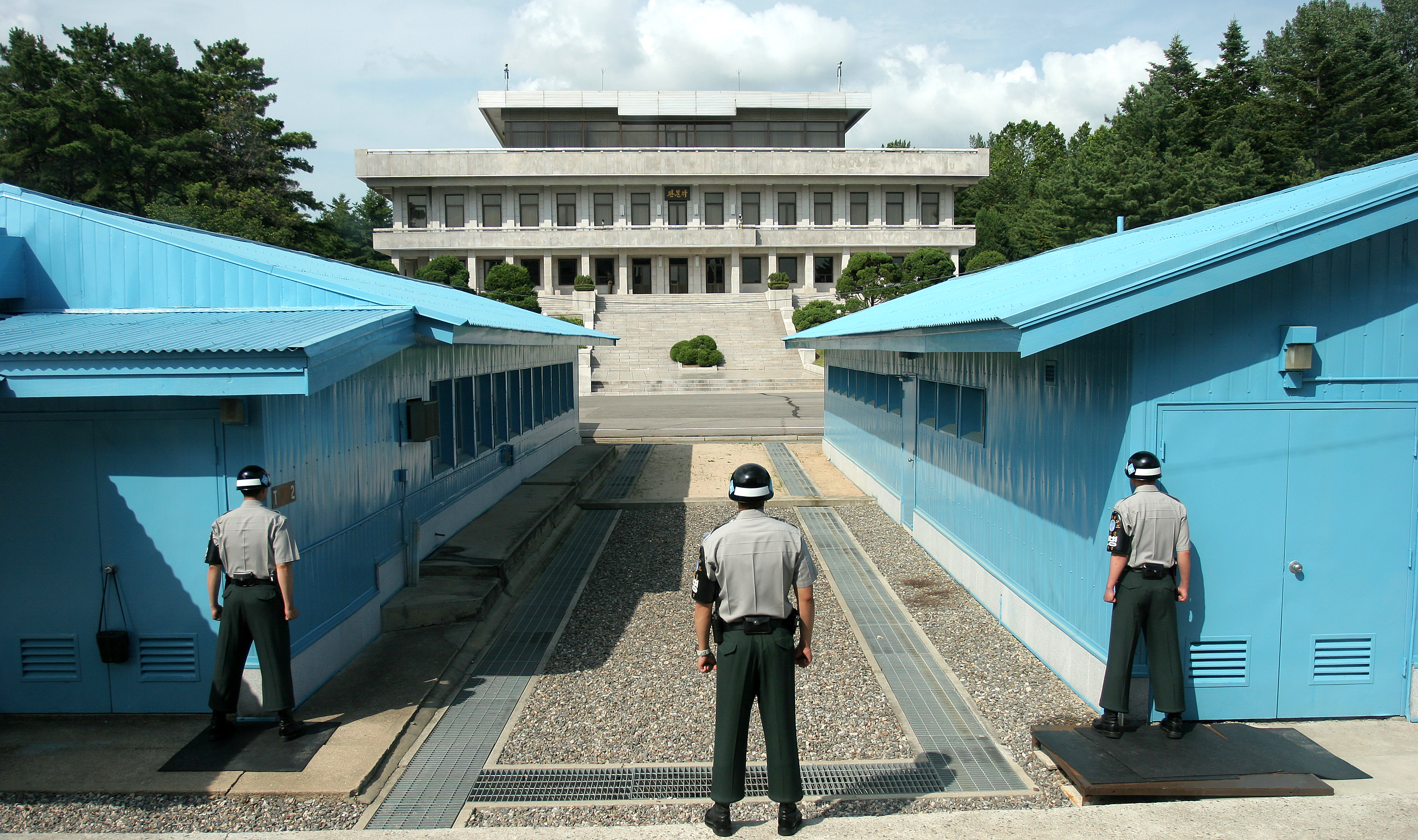
South Korean policemen standing guard at the North Korea-South Korea border. View from South Korea.

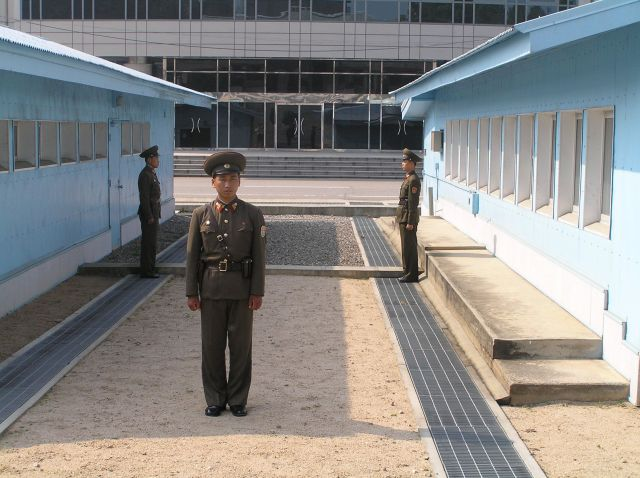
North Korean policemen standing guard at the North Korea-South Korea border. View from North Korea.

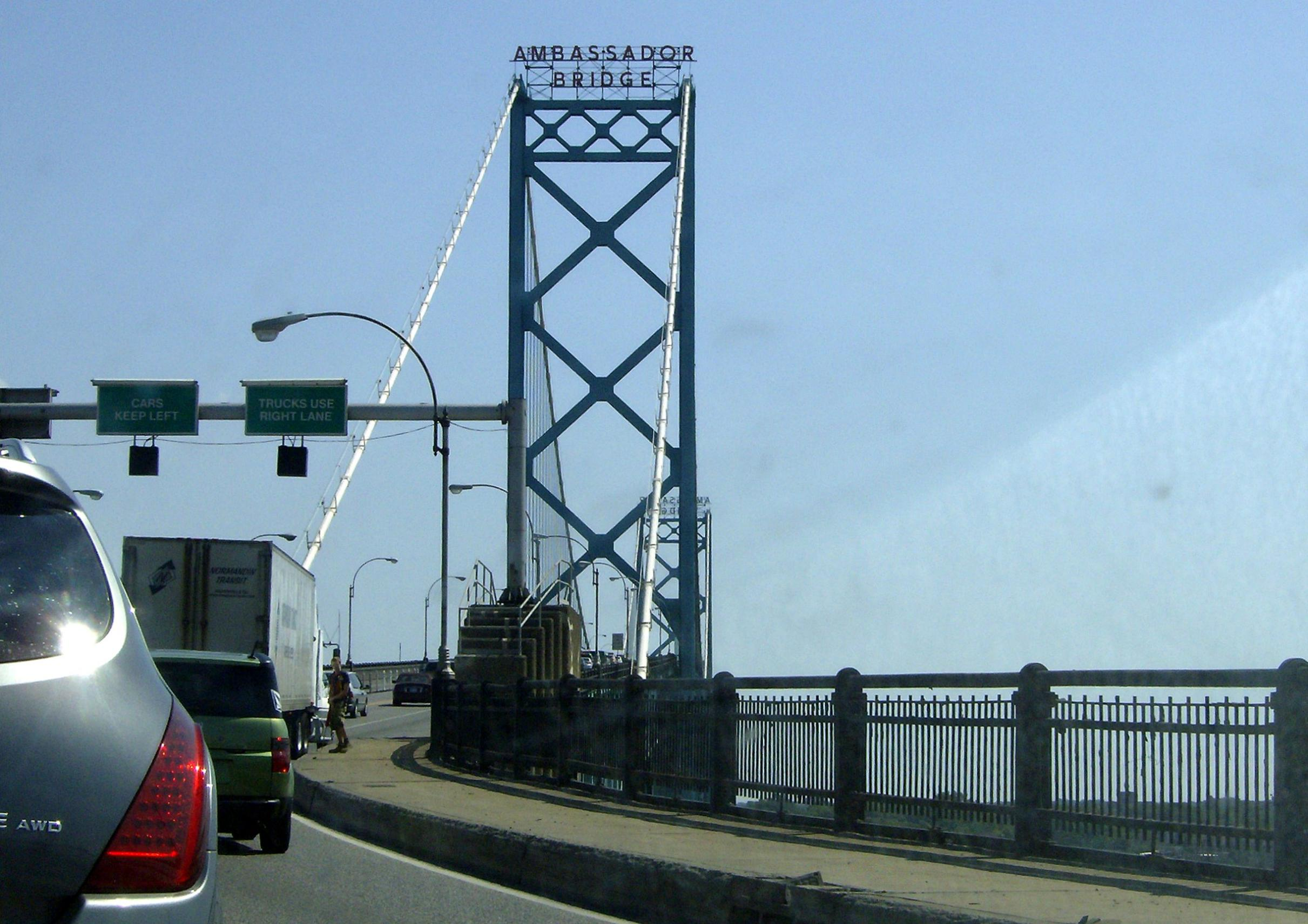
Crossing the Ambassador Bridge into Canada from the US

Regulated borders have varying degrees of control on the movement of persons and trade between nations and jurisdictions. Most industrialized nations have regulations on entry and require one or more of the following procedures: visa check, passport check or customs checks. Most regulated borders have regulations on immigration, types of wildlife and plants, and illegal objects such as drugs or weapons. Overall border regulations are placed by national and local governments and can vary depending on nation and current political or economic conditions. Some of the most regulated borders in the world include: Australia, the United States, Israel, Canada, the United Kingdom, and the United Arab Emirates. These nations have government-controlled border agencies and organizations that enforce border regulation policies on and within their borders.

=== Open borders ===
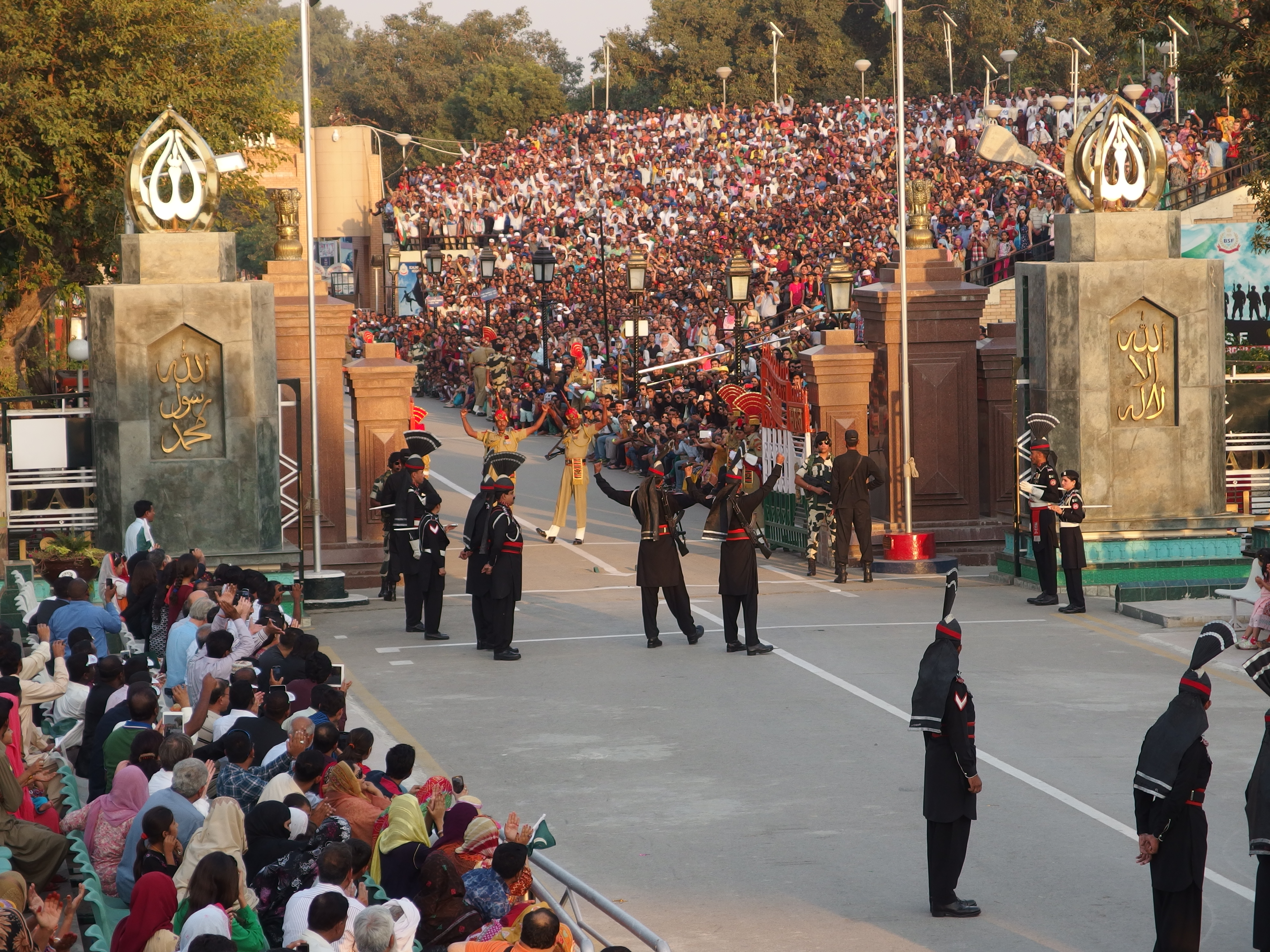
Indian and Pakistan border officers at the India-Pakistan border

An open border is the deregulation and or lack of regulation on the movement of persons between nations and jurisdictions. This definition does not apply to trade or movement between privately owned land areas. Most nations have open borders for travel within their nation of travel, though more authoritarian states may limit the freedom of internal movement of its citizens, as for example in the former USSR. However, only a handful of nations have deregulated open borders with other nations, an example of this being European countries under the Schengen Agreement or the open Belarus-Russia border. Open borders used to be very common amongst all nations, however this became less common after the First World War, which led to the regulation of open borders, making them less common and no longer feasible for most industrialized nations. An example of Open orders include the Schengen Area where 29 European nations mutually abolished their border control.

=== Demilitarized zones ===
A demilitarized zone (DMZ) is a border separating two or more nations, groups or militaries that have agreed to prohibit the use of military activity or force within the border's bounds. A DMZ can act as a war boundary, ceasefire line, wildlife preserve, or a de facto international border. An example of a demilitarized international border is the 38th parallel between North and South Korea. The Korean demilitarized zone acts as a safe space for endangered species like the Asiatic black bears, yellow marten, deer, otters and others species; it has been called a rare haven for species at risk of being lost. Other notable DMZ zones include Antarctica and outer space (consisting of all space 100 miles away from the earth's surface), both are preserved for world research and exploration. The prohibition of control by nations can make a DMZ unexposed to human influence and thus developed into a natural border or wildlife preserve, such as on the Korean Demilitarized Zone, the Vietnamese Demilitarized Zone, and the Green Line in Cyprus.

== Border economics ==
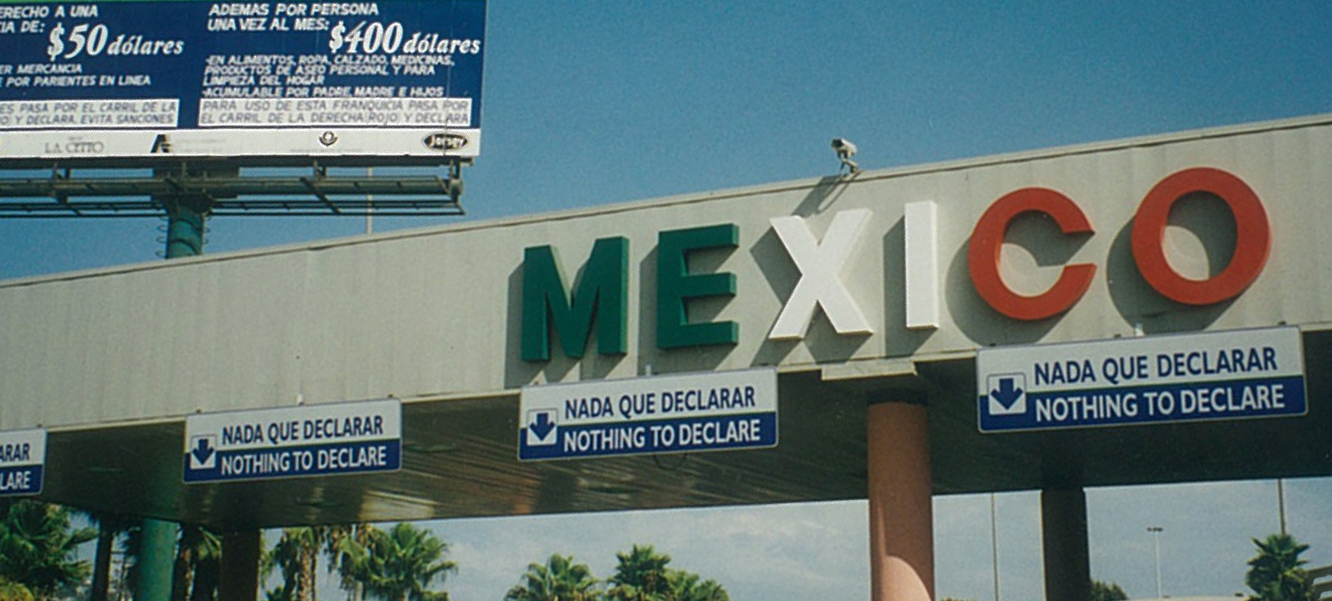
The United States–Mexico border: San Diego–Tijuana.

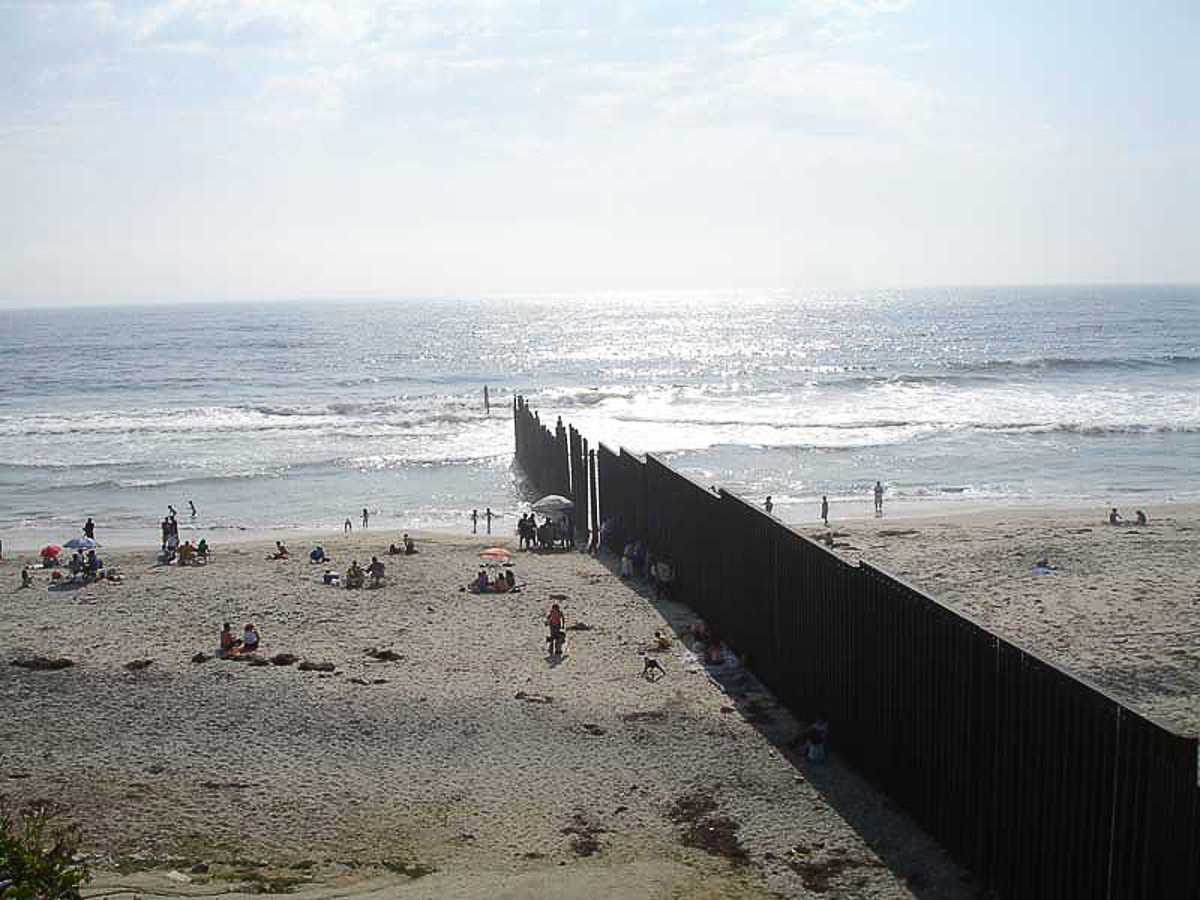
A border wall on a beach separating the United States and Mexico

Borders undermine economic activity and development by reducing trade activity.

The presence of borders often fosters certain economic features or anomalies. Wherever two jurisdictions come into contact, special economic opportunities arise for border trade. Smuggling provides a classic case; contrariwise, a border region may flourish on the provision of excise or of import–export services — legal or quasi-legal, corrupt or legitimate. Different regulations on either side of a border may encourage services to position themselves at or near that border: thus the provision of pornography, of prostitution, of alcohol, fireworks, and/or of narcotics may cluster around borders, city limits, county lines, ports and airports. In a more planned and official context, Special Economic Zones (SEZs) often tend to cluster near borders or ports.

Even if the goods are not perceived to be undesirable, states will still seek to document and regulate the cross-border trade in order to collect tariffs and benefit from foreign currency exchange revenues. Thus, there is the concept unofficial trade in goods otherwise legal; for example, the cross-border trade in livestock by pastoralists in the Horn of Africa. Ethiopia sells an estimated $250 to $300 million of livestock to Somalia, Kenya and Djibouti every year unofficially, over 100 times the official estimate.

Human economic traffic across borders (apart from kidnapping) may involve mass commuting between workplaces and residential settlements. The removal of internal barriers to commerce, as in France after the French Revolution or in Europe since the 1940s, de-emphasizes border-based economic activity and fosters free trade. Euroregions are similar official structures built around commuting across boundary.

== Politics ==
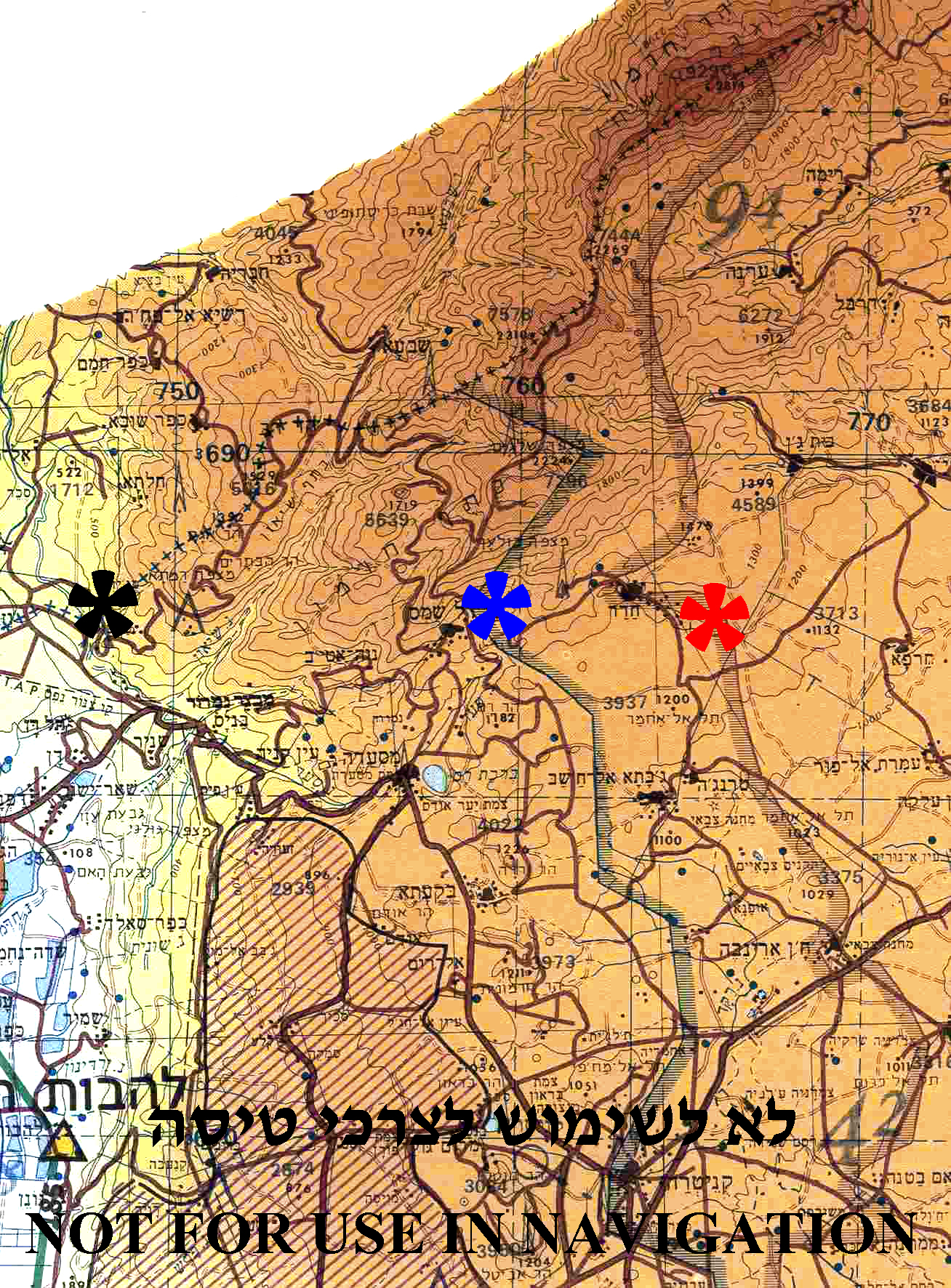
Borders between Israel, Syria and Lebanon in Mount Hermon region. The Blue Line between Israel and Lebanon—marked by black asterisk. Disengagement Israeli front line with Syria (1974)—marked by blue asterisk. Disengagement Syrian front line with Israel (1974)—marked by red asterisk.

Political borders have a variety of meanings for those whom they affect. Many borders in the world have checkpoints where border control agents inspect persons and/or goods crossing the boundary.

Some borders require presentation of legal paperwork like passports and visas, or other identity documents, for persons to cross borders. To stay or work within a country's borders aliens (foreign persons) may need special immigration documents or permits; but possession of such documents does not guarantee that the person should be allowed to cross the border.

Moving goods across a border often requires the payment of excise tax, often collected by customs officials. Animals (and occasionally humans) moving across borders may need to go into quarantine to prevent the spread of exotic infectious diseases. Most countries prohibit carrying illegal drugs or endangered animals across their borders. Moving goods, animals, or people illegally across a border, without declaring them or seeking permission, or deliberately evading official inspection, constitutes smuggling. Controls on car liability insurance validity and other formalities may also take place.

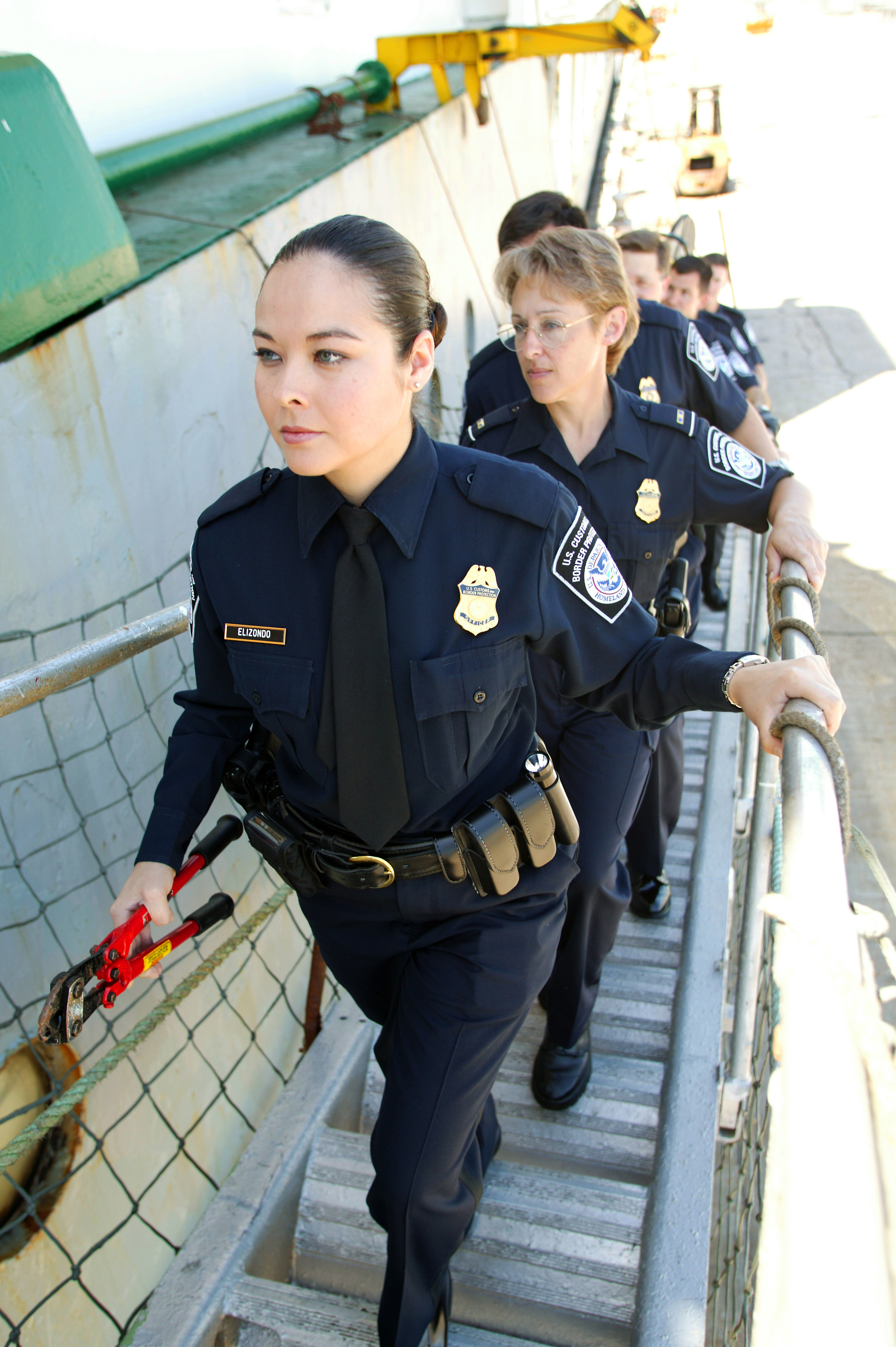
US customs and border officers boarding a ship at the border.

A border may have been:

- Agreed by the countries on both sides
- Imposed by the country on one side
- Imposed by third parties, e.g. an international conference
- Inherited from a former state, colonial power or aristocratic territory
- Inherited from a former internal border, such as within the former Soviet Union
- Never formally defined.

In addition, a border may be a de facto military ceasefire line. In much of Europe, controls on persons were abolished by the 1985 Schengen Agreement and subsequent European Union legislation. Since the Treaty of Amsterdam, the competence to pass laws on crossing internal and external borders within the European Union and the associated Schengen Area states (Iceland, Norway, Switzerland, and Liechtenstein) lies exclusively within the jurisdiction of the European Union, except where states have used a specific right to opt out (United Kingdom and Ireland, which maintain the Common Travel Area amongst themselves).

The United States has notably increased measures taken in border control on the Canada–United States border and the United States–Mexico border during its war on terrorism (See Shantz 2010). One American writer has said that the 3,600 km (2,200 mi) US-Mexico border is probably "the world's longest boundary between a First World and Third World country".

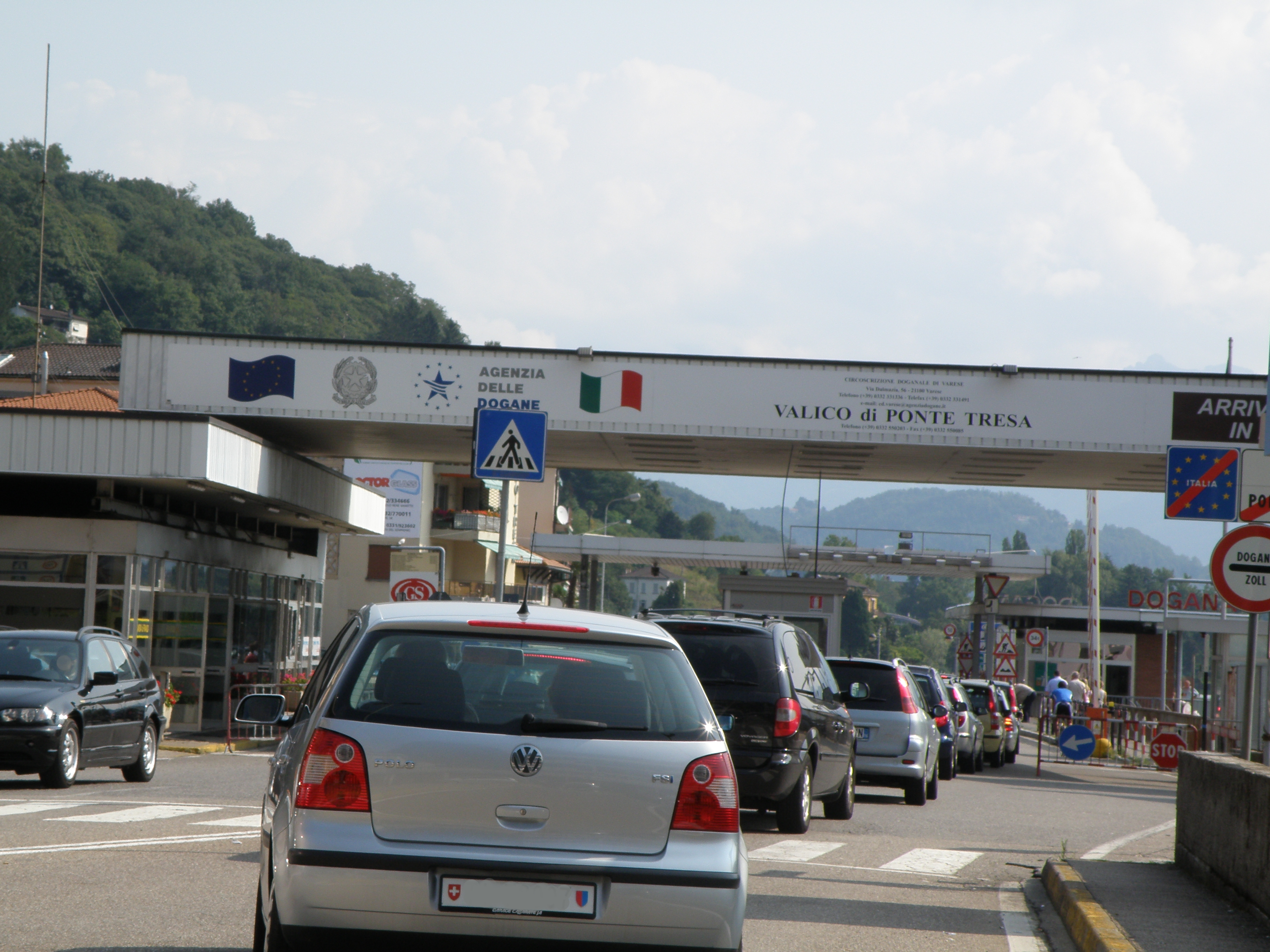
The Swiss–Italian border

Historic borders such as the Great Wall of China, the Maginot Line, and Hadrian's Wall have played a great many roles and been marked in different ways. While the stone walls, the Great Wall of China and the Roman Hadrian's Wall in Britain had military functions, the entirety of the Roman borders were very porous, which encouraged Roman economic activity with neighbors. On the other hand, a border like the Maginot Line was entirely military and was meant to prevent any access in what was to be World War II to France by its neighbor, Germany; Germany ended up going around the Maginot Line through Belgium just as it had done in World War I.

=== Border conflict ===
Border conflicts are disputes between territories that occur at the borders separating said territories. They occur when one party constructs identities or interests related to the border which are incompatible with the other party's identities and interests. Border conflicts or the potential of such are the reason why many borders feature fortifications and zoning like no man's lands, demilitarized zones, demarcation lines and buffer zones. Examples of border conflicts include skirmishes and wars, such as the 38th Parallel (between North and South Korea), Western Sahara conflict, and Kashmir region conflicts between India and Pakistan.

A border conflict can occur due to several reasons. Most commonly, territorial disputes can result in border conflicts, as it is the case with the Kashmir conflict.

== Border construction and crossings ==
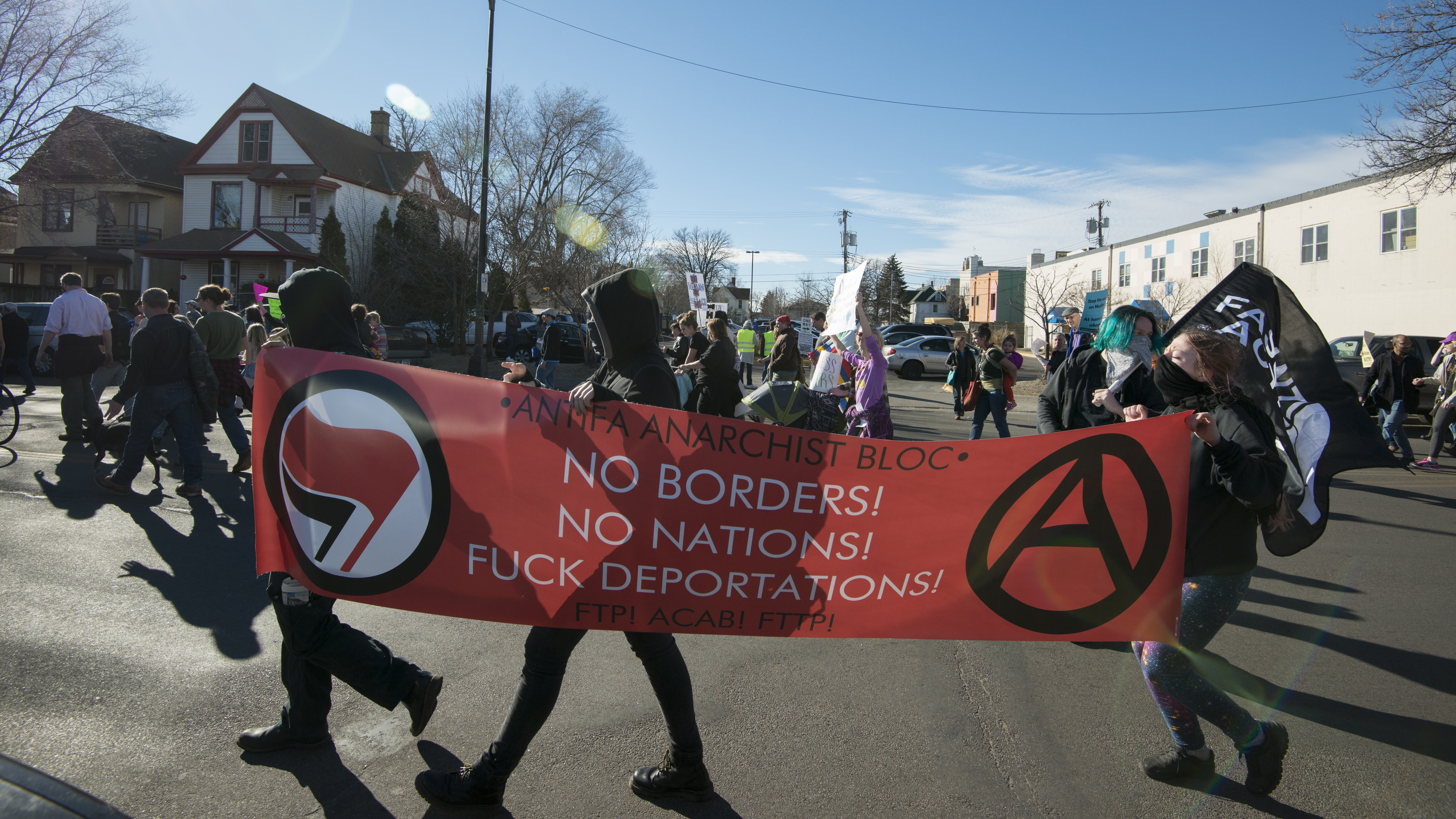
Anarchist protest against borders and deportations in Minneapolis, United States

While many borders are based on specific natural landscape features, some borders have additional man-made infrastructure. Fencing is used for security reasons, mainly to prevent unauthorised activity between the borders, including the travelling and transport of humans and goods. In a state of increased tension, borders may also be heavily fortified, with defensive infrastructure being built. Crossings may be built into a border to allow for regulated crossing into such territory.

=== Crossings and transition ===
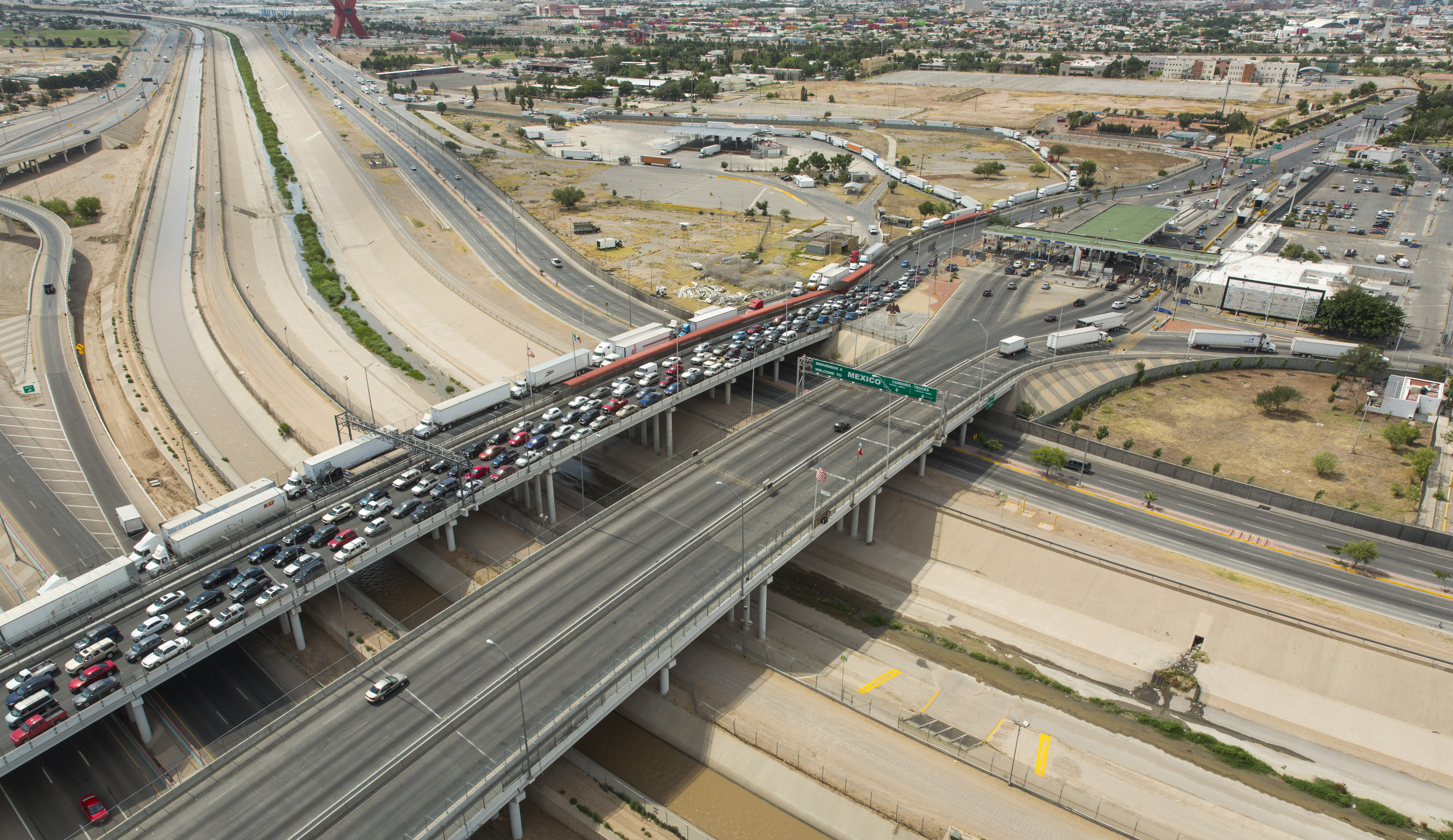
US-Mexico border crossing

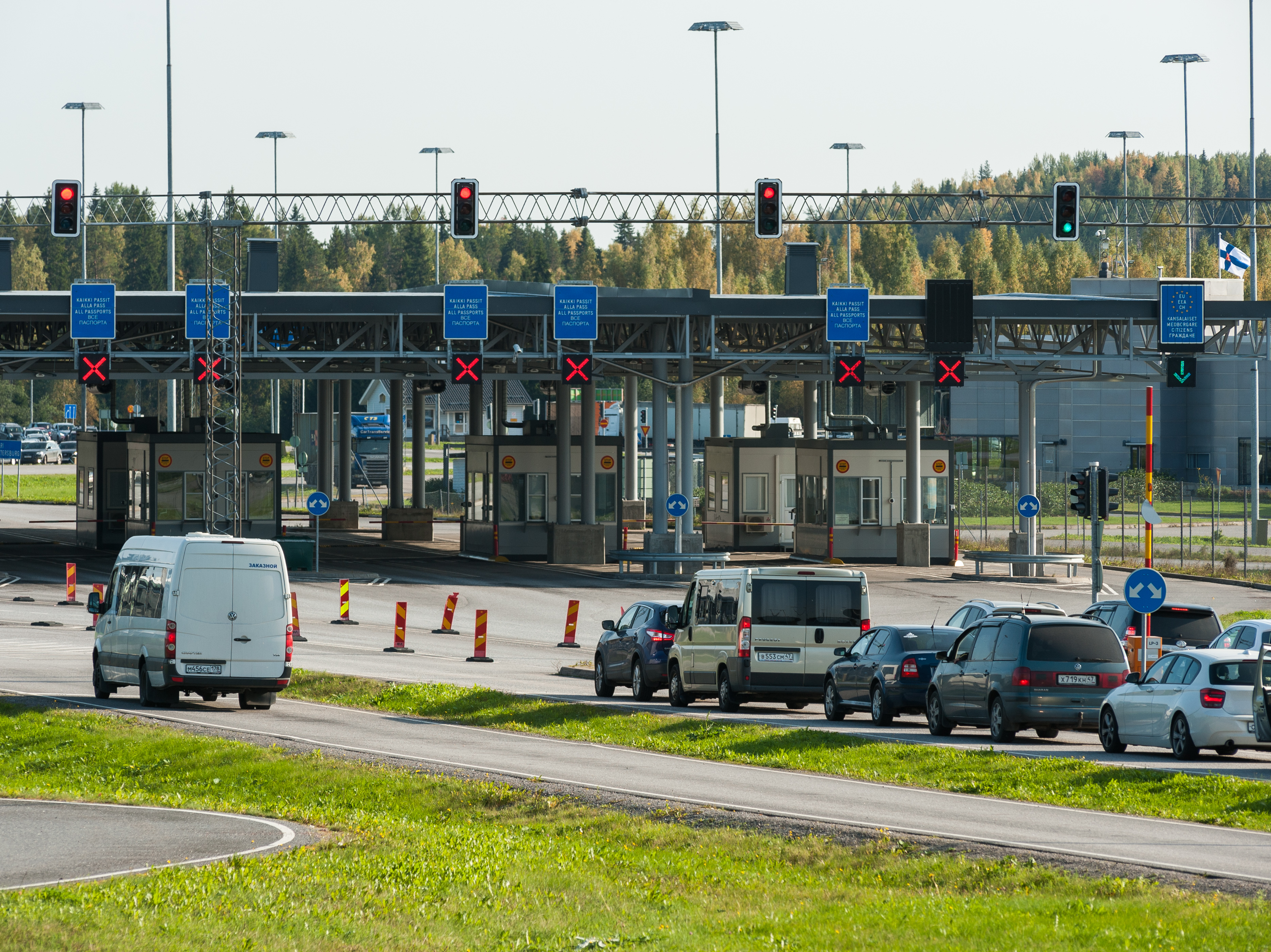
The car traffic on the Finnish side of the Russian border at the Nuijamaa Border Crossing Point in Nuijamaa, Lappeenranta, Finland

Even the most fortified borders reserve specific places to allow crossing. The many forms of borders have different ways of enabling and controlling passage.

=== Movement and permeability ===
Borders can have a significant impact on and function for movement. It can enable and stop movement, across as well as along borders.

The permeability of borders depends on its construction, availability of crossings, regulation and types or scope of activity. The permeability can vary, borders can be barriers for humans, but also for animal migration or types of pollution.

== Overlap and cooperation ==
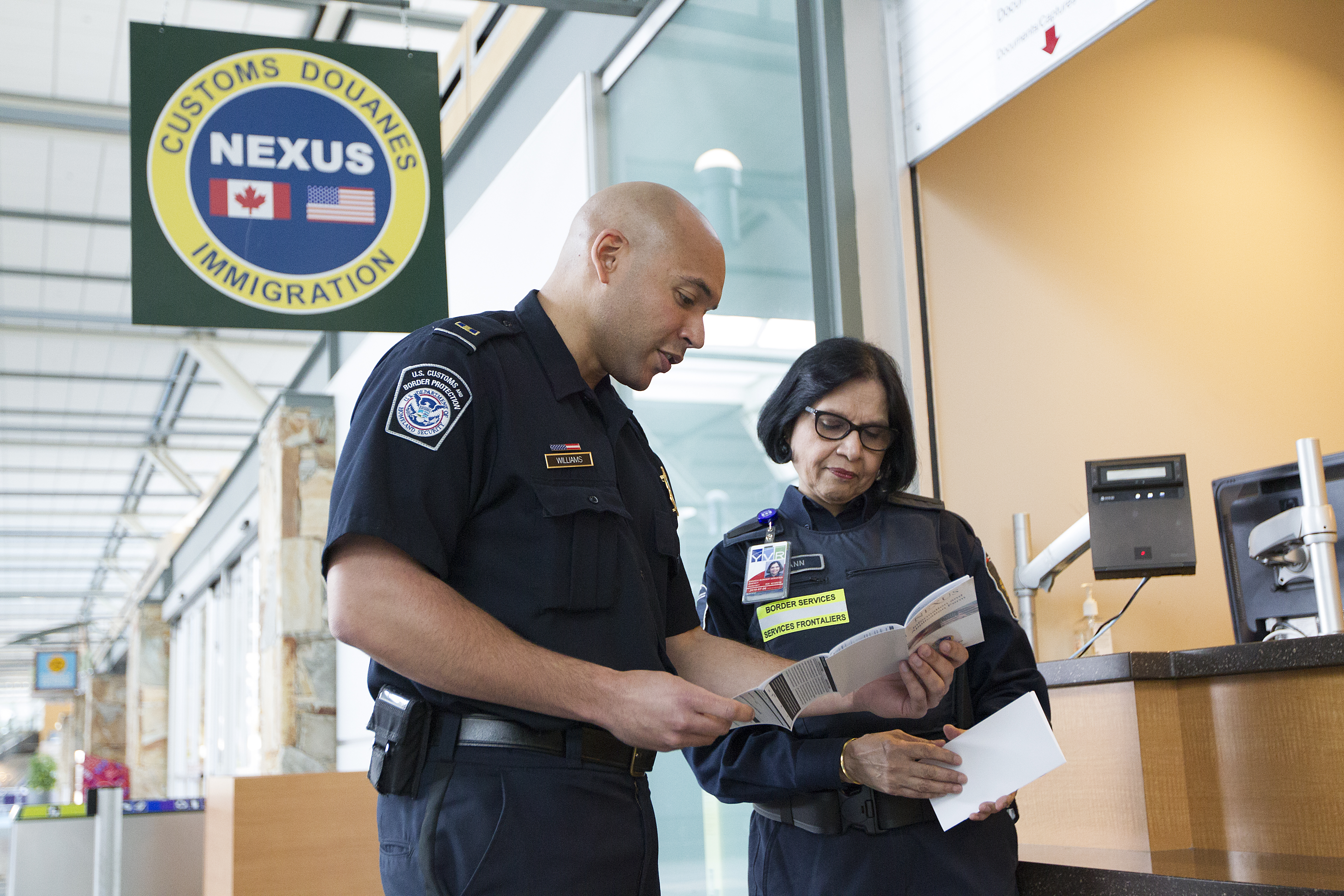
Canadian and American border security officers working together

Borders facilitate or block hybrids like border overlap and cooperation beyond mere encounter and exchange.

=== Cross-border regions ===
Macro-regional integration initiatives, such as the European Union and NAFTA, have spurred the establishment of cross-border regions. These are initiatives driven by local or regional authorities, aimed at dealing with local border-transcending problems such as transport and environmental degradation. Many cross-border regions are also active in encouraging intercultural communication and dialogue as well as cross-border economic development strategies.
In Europe, the European Union provides financial support to cross-border regions via its Interreg programme. The Council of Europe has issued the Outline Convention on Transfrontier Co-operation, providing a legal framework for cross-border co-operation even though it is in practice rarely used by Euroregions.

== Border studies ==
There has been a renaissance in the study of borders starting with the end of the 1990s, partially from the creation of a counter-narrative to the discourse about the world becoming a borderless and deterritorialized place, which has accompanied theories about globalization. Examples of recent initiatives are the Border Regions in Transition network of scholars, the International Boundaries Research Unit at the University of Durham, the Association for Borderlands Studies based in North America, the African Borderlands Research Network and the founding of smaller border research centres at Nijmegen and Queen's University Belfast.

== Border art ==
Border art is a contemporary art practice rooted in the socio-political experience(s), such as of those on the U.S.-Mexico borderlands, or frontera. Since its conception in the mid-1980s, this artistic practice has assisted in the development of questions surrounding homeland, borders, surveillance, identity, race, ethnicity, and national origin(s).

Border art as a conceptual artistic practice, however, opens up the possibility for artists to explore similar concerns of identity and national origin(s) but whose location is not specific to the U.S-Mexico border. A border can be a division, dividing groups of people and families. Borders can include but are not limited to language, culture, social and economic class, religion, and national identity. In addition to a division, a border can also conceive a borderland area that can create a cohesive community separate from the mainstream cultures and identities portrayed in the communities away from the borders, such as the Tijuana-San Diego border between Mexico and the United States.

Border art can be defined as an art that is created in reference to any number of physical or imagined boundaries. This art can but is not limited to social, political, physical, emotional and/or nationalist issues. Border art is not confined to one particular medium. Border art/artists often address the forced politicization of human bodies and physical land and the arbitrary, yet incredibly harmful, separations that are created by these borders and boundaries. These artists are often "border crossers" themselves. They may cross borders of traditional art-making (through performance, video, or a combination of mediums). They may at once be artists and activists, existing in multiple social roles at once. Many border artists defy easy classifications in their artistic practice and work.

== See also ==
- Border barrier
- Border control
- Border irregularities of the United States
- Boundaries between the continents of Earth
- National boundary delimitation
- Enclave and exclave
- Illegal entry
- List of border conflicts
- List of bordering countries with greatest relative differences in GDP (PPP) per capita
- List of countries and territories by land borders
- List of countries by land and maritime borders
- List of countries that border only one other country
- List of divided islands
- List of international river borders
- List of land borders with dates of establishment
- List of national border changes from 1815 to 1914
- List of national border changes (1914–present)
- List of territorial disputes
- Maritime boundary
- Natural frontiers
- Quadripoint
- Tripoint
