= Natural borders of France =

Political and geographic theory developed in France

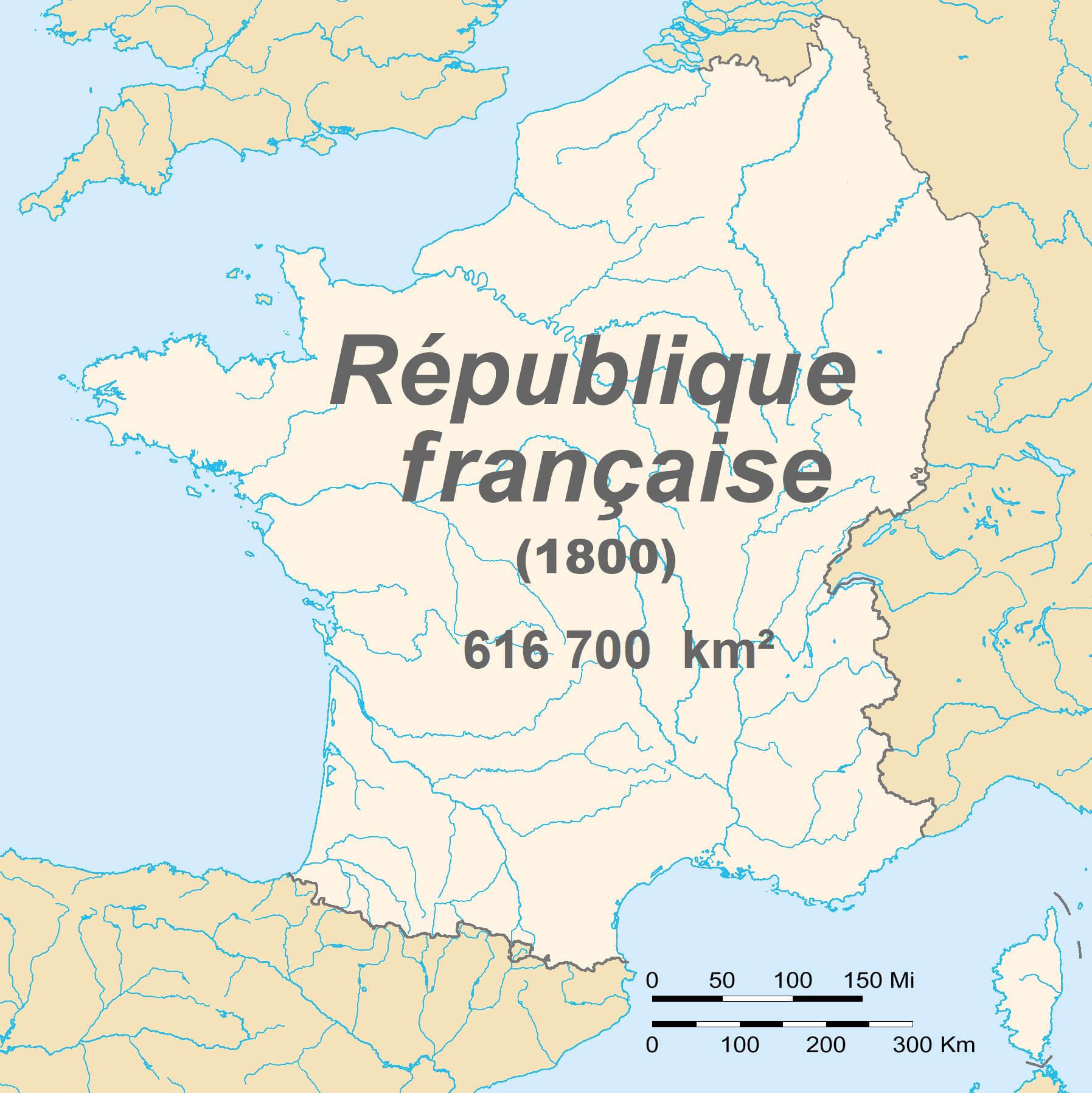
The French First Republic in 1800. The borders of France then corresponded closely to the 'natural borders' as defined by the French revolutionaries.

The natural borders of France (French: Frontières naturelles de la France) were a nationalist model of French state-building developed during the French Revolution that called for the expansion of France's borders to prominent natural boundaries. These boundaries correspond to the Rhine, the Alps, the Mediterranean Sea, the Pyrenees and the Atlantic Ocean.

== Theory ==
The first mention of the natural borders appeared in 1642 in an apocryphal statement by Cardinal Richelieu.

However, it was not until 1786 that the idea started to develop again. The Prussian Anacharsis Cloots published that year the Wishes of a Gallophile (French: Voeux d'un gallophile) and pronounced himself in favor of the annexation by France of the left bank of the Rhine, "natural boundary of the Gauls" (French: borne naturelle des Gaules). This notion was influential among the French revolutionaries after 1790, notably among the Jacobins. After the victory of Valmy on September 20, 1792, the National Convention urged the soldiers to go after the Prussian armies of the other bank of the Rhine. For General Adam Philippe, Comte de Custine, commander of the Army of the Rhine, "if the Rhine is not the limit of the Republic, it will perish" (Si le Rhin n'est pas la limite de la République, elle périra). On December 17, the Convention adopted the Declaration of the French Revolutionary Administration of Conquered Lands (French: Décret sur l'administration révolutionnaire française des pays conquis), prelude to the annexation of Belgium by France. This was demanded by Georges Danton on January 21, 1793, justifying that "the limits of France are marked by nature, we will reach the four corners of the horizon, to the edge of the Rhine, to the edge of the ocean, to the edge of the Pyrenees, to the edge of the Alps. The boundaries of our Republic must be there."

In his seminal lecture What Is a Nation?, which criticizes primordialist accounts of the nation, the French historian Ernest Renan argues against the notion that France's borders are natural: "The frontiers of France in 1789 had nothing natural or necessary about them."

The theory of France's natural borders was commonplace in French textbooks until the mid-20th century. Peter Sahlins writes "most historians of France today dismiss the "doctrine" of natural frontiers as too teleological a reading of France's history.... As a model of French identity, it formed part of a constitutive myth of the state."

== Application ==
=== In the Alps ===
The Army of the Alps invaded Savoy, part of the Kingdom of Sardinia allied with Austria, and took it with very little resistance between the September 21 and 22, 1792. On October 26, an assembly of Savoyard élites met at Chambéry. The assembly ceased to recognise Victor Amadeus III of Sardinia as the sovereign. On October 29, they pronounced the annexation of Savoy to France. This unification was decreed by the Convention on November 17, 1792, and Savoy became the département of Mont-Blanc. On January 31, 1793, the Convention annexed the County of Nice and the Principality of Monaco to form the département of Alpes-Maritimes.

=== In Rhineland ===
Danton's rhetoric was spread throughout the occupied territories by the representatives of the Convention and the local supporters of the French, in order to prepare and justify the annexation of the territories. Even so, the French were beaten at the Battle of Neerwinden on March 18, 1793, and were forced to leave Belgium. The decisive French victory at the Battle of Fleurus in July 1794 and the founding of the Batavian Republic in January 1795 confirmed the French occupation of Belgium. Prussia started the negotiations that finished with the first treaty of Basel, signed April 5, 1795, by which Prussia ceded to France its territories on the left bank of the Rhine. The victories of Napoleon Bonaparte in Italy forced Austria to sign the treaty of Campo Formio on October 27, 1797. Austria ceded to France all its territories to the west of the Rhine. The French government reorganised the newly enlarged left bank of the Rhine and created four new departments: Mont-Tonnerre, Rhin-et-Moselle, Roer and Sarre.

=== In Belgium ===
After the victory at Fleurus, long debates took place at the Convention to decide the fate of the Austrian Netherlands. Pushed by Merlin de Douai, the Convention feared that a separate Belgian republic, along the lines of the Batavian Republic, would be too weak to resist the British and the Austrians, and would become a buffer state against the French republic. The convention finally voted for annexation of Belgium on October 1, 1795, creating the nine Belgian départements: Dyle, Deux-Nèthes, Escaut, Forêts, Jemmape, Lys, Ourte, Meuse-Inférieure, and Sambre-et-Meuse. This annexation was confirmed by the Treaty of Campo Formio, by which the Austrian Empire ceded the Austrian Netherlands to France, followed by the Treaty of Lunéville in 1801.

== The formation of the Hexagon ==
Under the Consulate and the First French Empire, Napoleon expanded France to its theoretical natural borders through his conquests, mainly with the goal of controlling the coasts. In fact, the war against the United Kingdom rested partly on the ban on all commerce with Great Britain. In 1812, France had 130 departments (134 including the four departments in Catalonia, which were only partially integrated). France's territory was stretched beyond the Rhine by the annexation of the Kingdom of Holland (1810), and the north coast of Germany to Lübeck (1811), beyond the Pyrenees by the annexation of part of Catalonia (1812), and beyond the Alps by the annexation of parts of Italy between 1801 and 1805. After the first abdication of Napoleon on April 6, 1814, France lost, by the Treaty of Paris, all its territories conquered after 1792. France only kept a small part of Savoy. After Waterloo, by the second Treaty of Paris in 1815, France was taken back to its 1790 borders and therefore lost Savoy. Savoy and Nice were definitively annexed by France in 1860 by the Treaty of Turin.

The debate over France's borders continued throughout the nineteenth century. Jules Michelet, in his History of France, saw in it a deterministic cause of the history of France. The debate resurged in 1830 during the Belgian Revolution and then between 1871 and 1918, when Alsace-Lorraine was annexed and incorporated by the German Empire.

== See also ==
- French nationalism
- Rattachism – a movement in (Belgium) Wallonia aiming for unification with France
- Gallia Belgica
- Lebensraum
- Manifest destiny
- Irredentism
- French irredentism
- Revanchism
- Territorial evolution of France
- 130 departments of the First French Empire

== Bibliography ==
- Smets, Josef (1998). "Le Rhin, frontière naturelle de la France" [The Rhine, natural border of France]. Annales historiques de la Révolution française. 314 (314): 675–698. doi:10.3406/ahrf.1998.2206. (in French)
- Sébastien Dubois, "La conquête de la Belgique et la théorie des frontières naturelles de la France (XVIIe ‑ XIXe siècle)," in Laurence Van Ypersele (dir.), Imaginaires de guerre. L'histoire entre mythe et réalité, proceedings at Louvain-la-Neuve from 3 to 5 May 2001, Presses universitaires de Louvain and Academia Bruylant, coll. "Transversalités" (#3), Louvain-la-Neuve, 2003 ISBN 2-87416-004-0; ISBN 2-87209-697-3, pp. 171–200
- Denis Richet, "Frontières naturelles", in François Furet (dir.) and Mona Ozouf (dir.), Dictionnaire critique de la Révolution française, Paris, 1988, 1992, 2007
- (in French) Jean Tulard, Jean-François Fayard and Alfred Fierro, Histoire et dictionnaire de la Révolution française. 1789–1799, Robert Laffont, Bouquins collection, Paris, 1987 (ISBN 270282076X)
