= Campaign against female genital mutilation in colonial Kenya =

Period in Kenyan history (1929–1932)

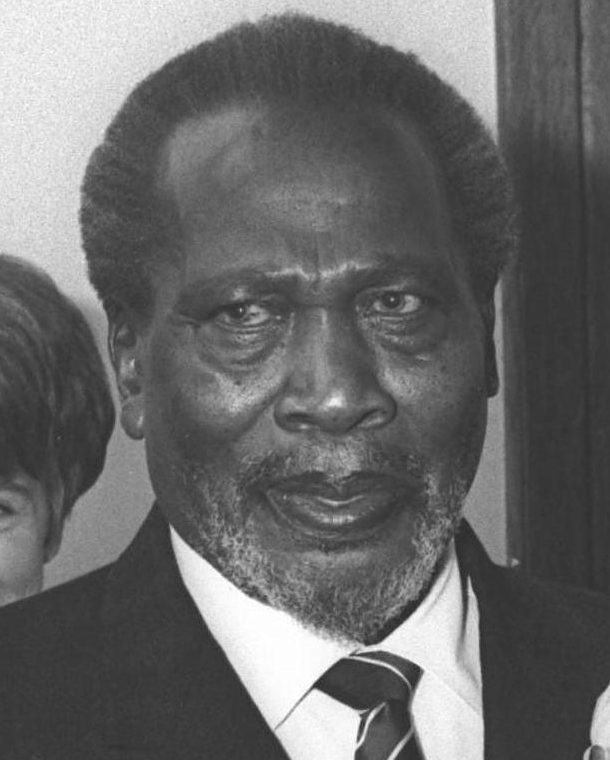
African nationalist leader Jomo Kenyatta, photographed in 1966. Kenyatta was a prominent opponent of efforts to ban female genital mutilation.

The campaign against female genital mutilation in colonial Kenya (1929–1932), also known as the female circumcision controversy, was a period within Kenyan historiography known for efforts by British missionaries, particularly from the Church of Scotland, to stop the practice of female genital mutilation in colonial Kenya. (Note: Lynn M. Thomas (2000): "The years 1929 to 1931 mark what has been termed within Kenyan historiography as the 'female circumcision controversy'.") (Note: Margaret Strobel and Marjorie Bingham (2004): "The 'female circumcision controversy' played a critical role in Gikuyu nationalism.") The campaign was met with resistance by the Kikuyu, the country's largest tribe. According to American historian Lynn M. Thomas, female genital mutilation became a focal point of the movement campaigning for independence from British rule, and a test of loyalty, either to the Christian churches or to the Kikuyu Central Association, the largest association of the Kikuyu people.

== Background ==
The Kikuyu regarded female genital mutilation, which they called irua or circumcision, as an important rite of passage between childhood and adulthood. "Irua" consisted largely of three procedures: removal of the clitoral glans (clitoridectomy or Type I); removal of the clitoral glans and inner labia (excision or Type II); and removal of all the external genitalia and the suturing of the wound (infibulation or Type III). The Kikuyu practised Type II and sometimes Type III.

Uncut Kikuyu women were outcasts, and the idea of abandoning the practice was unthinkable to the vast majority of Kikuyus. Jomo Kenyatta, who became Kenya's first prime minister in 1963, wrote in 1938:

The real argument lies not in the defence of the surgical operation or its details, but in the understanding of a very important fact in the tribal psychology of the Gikuyu—namely, that this operation is still regarded as the very essence of an institution which has enormous educational, social, moral and religious implications, quite apart from the operation itself. For the present it is impossible for a member of the tribe to imagine an initiation without clitoridectomy. Therefore the abolition of the surgical element in this custom means to the Gikuyu the abolition of the whole institution.

== Campaign ==
Muthirigu

Little knives in their sheaths
That they may fight with the church,
The time has come.
Elders (of the church)
When Kenyatta comes
You will be given women's clothes
And you will have to cook him his food.

— from the Muthirigu (1929),
Kikuyu dance-songs against church opposition to FGM

The campaign against female genital mutilation had been led since around 1906 by Dr. John Arthur of the Church of Scotland. In March 1928, the issue came to a head when the Kikuyu Central Association announced that it would contest elections to the Native Council, with the defence of Kikuyu culture, including FGM, as its main platform. The following month the church at Tumutumu announced that all baptised members must offer a declaration of loyalty by swearing their opposition to FGM. Several other church missions followed suit. Robert Strayer and Jocelyn Murray write that the stage was set for a major conflict, with neither side willing to compromise.

In 1929 Marion Stevenson, a Scottish missionary, began referring to the procedures as the "sexual mutilation of women", rather than "female circumcision/initiation", and the Kenyan Missionary Council followed suit. Hulda Stumpf, an American missionary who had taken a strong stand against FGM, was murdered in her home near the Africa Inland Mission station in Kijabe in January 1930. The Times reported that "[t]he medical evidence ... inclined to the view that certain unusual wounds were due to the deliberate mutilation such as might have been caused by the use of a knife employed by native in the form of tribal operation." In November 1930, the Supreme Court in Nairobi, acquitting a man of Stumpf's murder, found no evidence that she had been killed because of the FGM campaign.

The issue of FGM was raised in the House of Commons on 11 December 1929 by Katharine Stewart-Murray, Duchess of Atholl and Eleanor Rathbone. The Duchess of Atholl told the House:

[W]e have been terribly impressed by what we have learned on a subject on which I put a question to-day to the Under-Secretary of State for the Colonies, namely, the existence of a pre-marriage rite among young girls, among many African tribes, a rite which is frequently referred to as the circumcision of girls. We have heard that this obtains in Southern Nigeria and among one tribe in Uganda, but we understand that it exists in its worst form among the Kikuyu tribe in Kenya. ... Our Committee has been assured by medical men, and by missionaries who have attended these women in hospital and in their homes, that the rite is nothing short of mutilation. It consists of the actual wholesale removal of parts connected with the organs of reproduction. The operation is performed publicly before one or two thousand people by an old woman of the tribe armed with an iron knife. No anesthetic is given, and no antiseptics are used.

Rathbone asked that the words "or sex" be added to the motion before the House: "Native self-governing institutions should be fostered; and franchise and legal rights should be based upon the principle of equality for all without regard to race, colour, or sex."

== See also ==
- Presbyterian Church of East Africa – Religious organization in East Africa
- Women in Kenya
