= Dry sex (disambiguation) =

The term dry sex may refer to:

- dry sex, the cultural practice of drying and tightening the vagina prior to sexual intercourse
- Non-penetrative sex, a sexual activity which does not involve penetration
- frotteurism
