= Hulda Stumpf =

American Christian missionary

Hulda Stumpf

Hulda Jane Stumpf (10 January 1867 – 3 January 1930) was an American Christian missionary who was murdered in her home near the Africa Inland Mission station in Kijabe, Kenya, where she worked as a secretary and administrator.

Stumpf may have been killed because of the mission's opposition to female genital mutilation (FGM, also known as female circumcision). Kenya's main ethnic group, the Kikuyu, regarded FGM as an important rite of passage, and there had been protests against the missionary churches in Kenya because they opposed it. The period is known within Kenyan historiography as the female circumcision controversy.

Stumpf is reported to have taken a firm stand against FGM in the Kijabe Girls' Home, which she helped to run. Some apparently unusual injuries on her body suggested to the governor of Kenya at the time that, before or after smothering her, her killer(s) had genitally mutilated her, although a court concluded that there was no evidence she had been killed because of her opposition to FGM.

== Early life and education ==
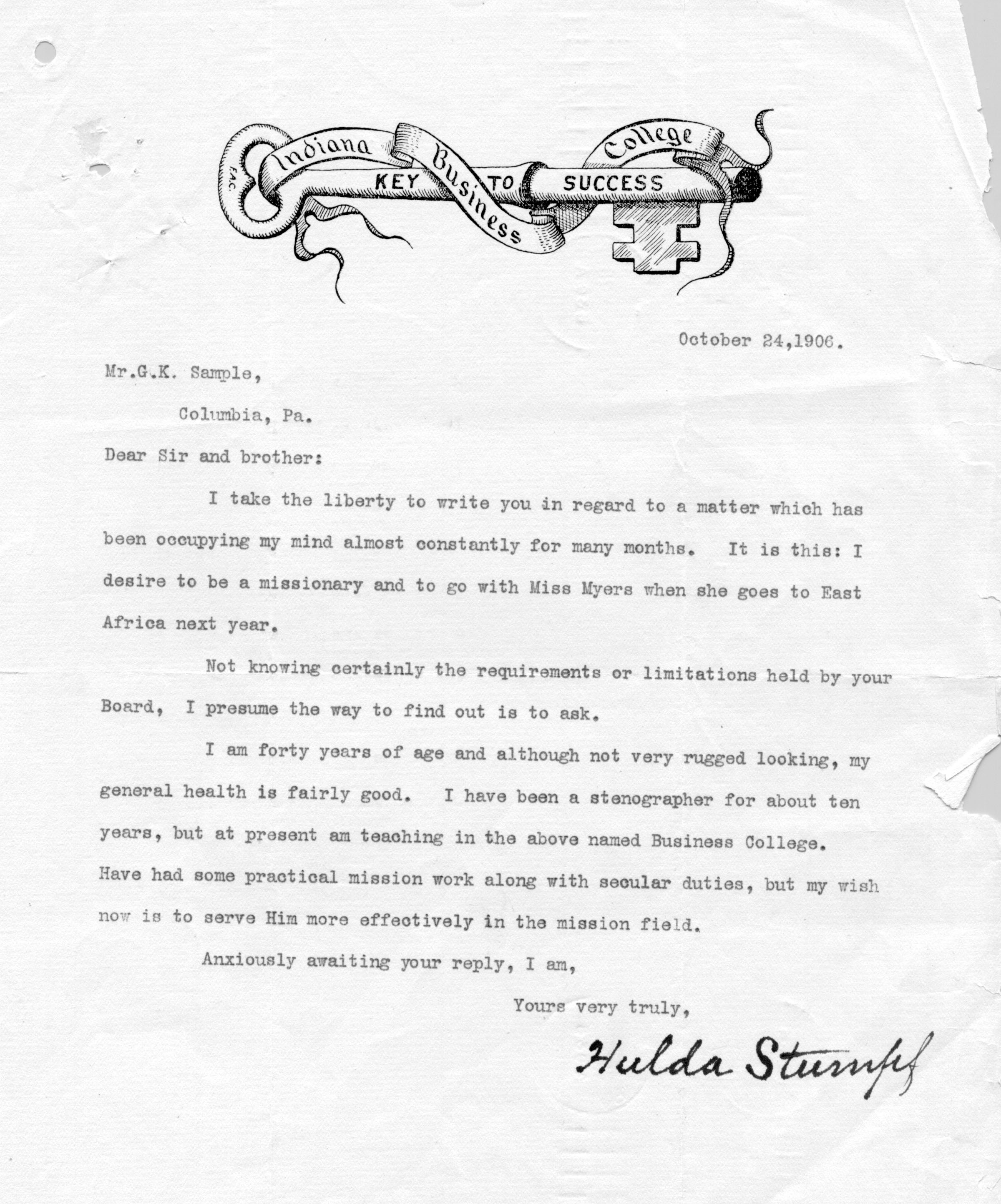
Stumpf's letter of 24 October 1906 to the Africa Inland Mission

Stumpf was born in Big Run, Pennsylvania, to J. R. Stumpf and his wife, and was raised in Indiana, Pennsylvania, one of four children. Her father owned Indiana's first five-and-dime store, located on the 700 block of Philadelphia Street. He was one of the first local people to own a steam car – in 1906 only six cars were registered in the town – and in July 1901 began using it to make deliveries to his customers.

Stumpf attended business school, then New York Music School for two years. After college she worked as a clerk and stenographer, then taught shorthand at Indiana Business College.

In October 1906 she applied for a position as a missionary with the Africa Inland Mission (AIM), describing herself in her first letter as "forty years of age ... and not very rugged looking," but in good health. She wrote on the application form that she wanted to work in Africa because of an "earnest desire, believing the time to be short, when He shall appear, and the need in foreign fields seems to be great."

In November 1906 she told the AIM that she was trying to move away from denominationalism: "There is only one form of church government, as I understand the term, and that is based upon the scriptures, and the scriptures alone, leaving out man's notion as to how a church should be governed." From May 1907 she studied for two months at the Moody Bible Institute in Chicago in preparation for her missionary work. Her college file described her as "direct, businesslike, and kind."

== Work in Africa ==
=== Arrival ===
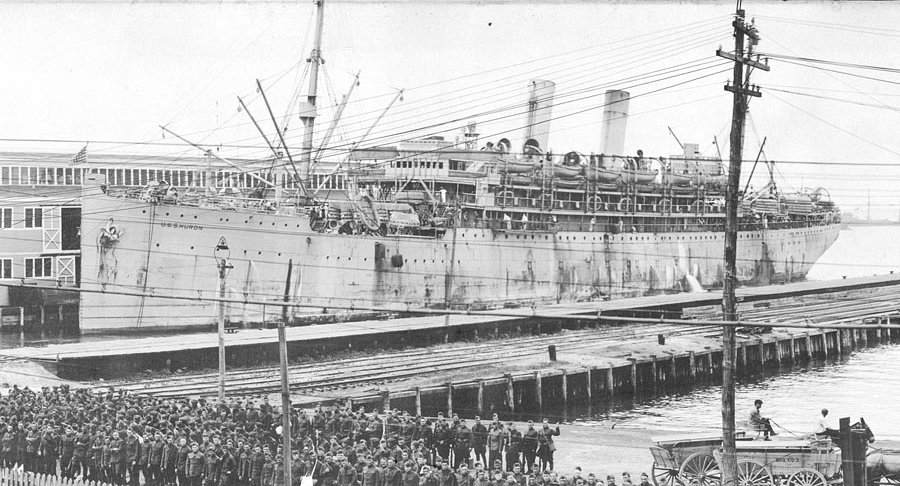
Stumpf sailed from New York on the SS Friedrich der Große in early November 1907.

Stumpf sailed from New York in November 1907 on the SS Friedrich der Große, arriving in Gibraltar on 12 November, and in Naples on 15 November. In December she arrived in Kijabe, Kenya, where she was assigned to work as a secretary for the head of the Africa Inland Mission. She wrote in a letter to the Indiana Gazette, dated 20 December 1907:

Since I am anxious that you should all know something about my trip and the condition of the country as we find it in British East Africa, I am sending this general letter. I have had my first visit to a native village where goats, sheep and human beings occupy the same hut. The houses are built of bamboo and thatched with grass; the center or highest point is about ten feet, sloping to the outer edge until the door or hole to crawl through is about three feet high. ... The chief occupation for the men is herding goats; the women do the gardening, wood chopping, carrying of heavy loads, etc. The women carried all our trunks and baggage from the depot up to the mission station, a distance of about three miles. It is considered a disgrace for a man to carry a load of wood, pail of water, etc.

The clothing consists of a goat skin thrown carelessly over the shoulder, and a great deal of tin and brass jewelry; rings on the ankles, toes, neck and ears, also bands or strings of beads around the head and waist. ... The chief timber just near us is wild olive and cedar. ... The roses and geraniums grow like trees almost and bloom continually. Ferns of all kinds grow wild. All the way from Mombasa to Kijabe, a distance of 1575 miles, we saw banana, coconut and mangoe trees ...

=== Kijabe Girls' Home ===
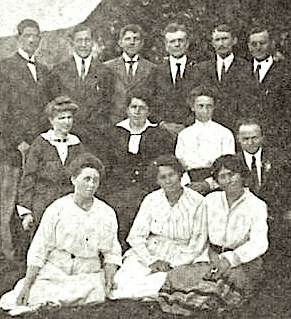
Stumpf (front left) with other students from the Moody Bible Institute, Kijabe, 1917

Stumpf remained in Africa for most of the rest of her life, helping to run the Kijabe mission and writing articles for its monthly magazine, Inland Africa. She lived for many years in the two-room cottage in which she died, 300 yards from the mission building. Her last visit to the United States was in 1925. By the time of her death the Africa Inland Mission had 45 mission stations in East Africa, 225 missionaries and 1,000 African teachers.

According to historian Dana Lee Robert, Stumpf—irascible and hard of hearing, at least toward the end of her life—was a typical missionary woman, viewed by African society as having little status because she was an unmarried woman, and viewed the same way within the mission because of her relatively junior role. Robert describes her as "[m]arginalized both missiologically and physically." Nevertheless, Robert argues, as an agent of Western culture Stumpf represented a significant "challenge to daily life" in Africa.

One of her duties was to help administer the Kijabe Girls' Home and Training School, where girls were taught literacy and agricultural skills, mathematics, sewing and Bible lessons. The school was known locally as Ishai because it had an iron roof, unlike others with grass roofs; ishai meant iron sheet and also place of shelter. It was one of several girls' homes and schools run by the Africa Inland Mission.

The relationship between the missionaries and the Kikuyu members of the AIM's congregation was not one of equals. James Karanja cites a letter Stumpf wrote in June 1916, asking that only plain dresses be sent from the United States for the Kikuyu girls, without "tucks, ruffles, piping, etc." Apparently the previous year dresses had been received by another mission that were regarded as too good for the Kikuyu, and they had been given to missionaries' children instead. The concern, Stumpf wrote (possibly relaying objections, rather than expressing her own), was that the Kikuyu would be "dressed better than white children."

== Female genital mutilation ==
=== Missionary opposition ===
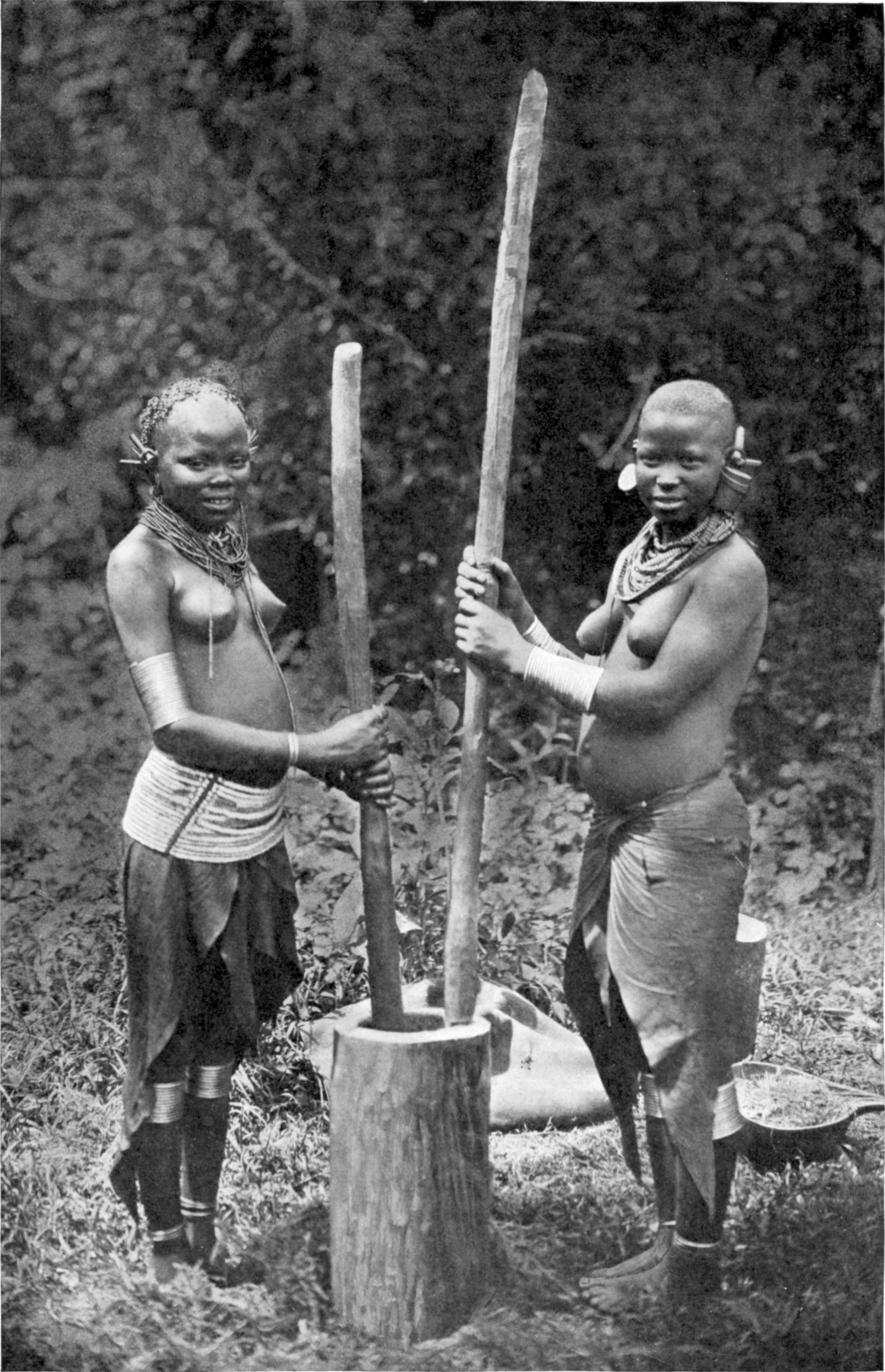
Kikuyu women in 1911

Female genital mutilation (FGM) was regarded by the Kikuyu, Kenya's main ethnic group, as an important rite of passage between childhood and adulthood. The procedures include removal of the clitoris (clitoridectomy), removal of the inner labia (excision), and removal of all the external genitalia and the suturing of the wound (infibulation). The Kikuyu practised excision and sometimes infibulation, calling it irua for female and male circumcision. A memorandum by the Church of Scotland Mission described it, in or around 1929:

Female circumcision, as it exists among the Kikuyu, is an operation which varies in severity, some sections of the tribe practising a more drastic form than others. It involves the removal of not only the Clitoris, but also the labia minora and half the labia majora, together with the surrounding tissue, resulting in the permanent mutilation affecting the woman's natural functions of maturation, menstruation, and parturition, with disastrous results not only to the birth rate, but also to the physique and vitality of the tribe.

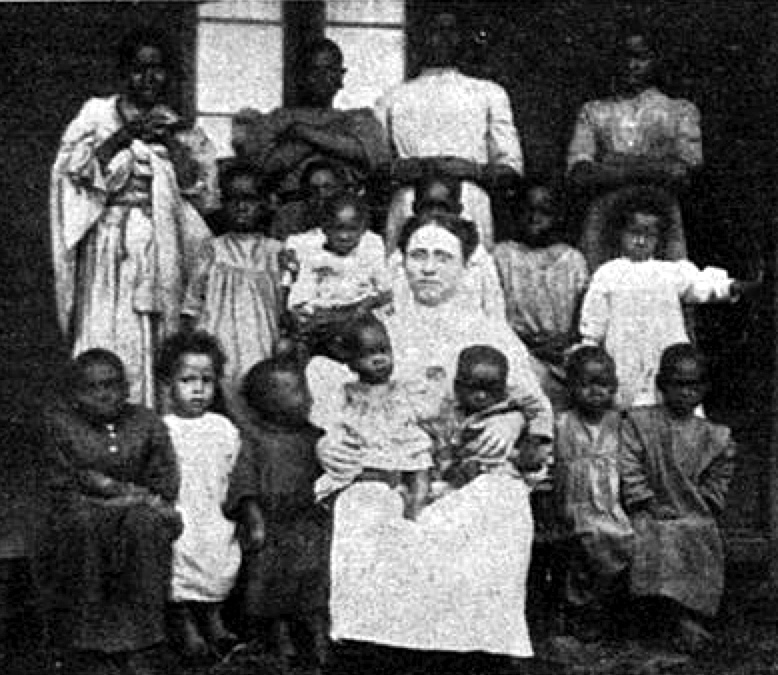
Kijabe Girls' Home, c. 1914. The missionary in the photograph may be Hulda Stumpf.

The medical issues apart, the missionaries objected to the sexual nature of the ceremonies. For the Kikuyu, the ceremonies and procedure were a vital ethnic ritual. Unexcised women (irugu) were viewed as unmarriageable outcasts. The Times of London reported in February 1930: "The young girls represent an economic asset to the parents and, in the eyes of the tribe, their value is completely lost unless the rites are performed. In fact, the older Kikuyu believe that no woman may bear children unless the ceremonies have been observed." There were rumours among the Kikuyu that the British wanted to stop irua so that they could marry the unmutilated girls and thus acquire Kenyan land.

The African Inland Mission began campaigning against FGM in 1914, and in 1916 the Church of Scotland Mission said it would excommunicate African Christians who practised it. The Kenya Missionary Council was the first organization known to call it mutilation; Marion Scott Stevenson, a Church of Scotland missionary, coined the term "sexual mutilation of women" for the practice in 1929, and the Missionary Council followed suit. That year African teachers working in CSM and AIM schools were asked to sign an oath renouncing both FGM and membership of the Kikuyu Central Association, the representative body of the Kikuyu people. Ninety percent of the African congregations chose to leave rather than swear the oath. Ronald Hyam writes that the issue split the Kikuyu Christian community into kirore (abolitionists) and karinga (traditionalists).

=== Stumpf's involvement ===
Elder of the Church,
your uncircumcised daughter is pregnant
and she will give birth to dogs.

— from the Muthirigu

Stumpf took "one of the firmest stands" against FGM at the Kijabe Girls' School, according to Dana Lee Robert. In May 1927 Stumpf described what happened to one teacher who had had FGM performed on his daughter:

About three years ago Muchai along with many others was prohibited from teaching and was excommunicated forever, the sentence read, unless he was willing to confess his wrong and swear allegiance to the white man and his rulings. The confession was sorrow for allowing his daughter to be circumcised.

On 30 September 1929 Stumpf wrote in her diary: "Crisis in native church over female circumcision," and on 2 November, referring to the oath the AIM had asked teachers to swear: "The past week was spent largely in prayer. Nearly all teachers refused to sign the petition re circumcision." On 29 December that year four men were arrested outside the Kijabe mission's church for singing from the Muthirigu, a series of protest dance-songs that thousands of Kikuyu began performing outside mission homes and schools.

== Death ==
Stumpf's headstone

Faithful unto death

Stumpf's body was discovered in her home on the morning of 3 January 1930 by Kakoi, a man who worked for her. She was buried nearby two days later. Another missionary, Helen Virginia Blakeslee, an osteopath, wrote in 1956 that she had examined Stumpf's body shortly after the death, and that there were no circumcision-style wounds:

Hulda Stumpf lay across the bed with a mattress doubled over her face. I was the second person to enter the room after the tragedy, and I made a careful examination of her poor body. She had been brutally treated but was not, as the story was circulated, the victim of a bungling attempt at circumcision. That finally she had been strangled was evident by the large black and blue patches on her throat and neck. She was safe on the other side, but had had a rough passage.

Blakeslee wrote that the death shook the local community and that the Kikuyu elders were horrified by it. African soldiers stood guard outside the mission and the girls were moved out of the school to live with other missionaries. (Note: Helen Virginia Blakeslee, Beyond the Kikuyu Curtain (1956): "The countryside was shaken as the news got around. Government officials came and went. Investigations dragged on throughout the following months with no apparent results. The old Kikuyu tribal elders were shocked and horrified that such a crime should be committed in their midst. African soldiers were sent to guard the station day and night. The girls and I were ordered to leave the school. Temporary quarters were found for us on the side of the ravine with other missionaries, where we would be less exposed to danger. The powers of darkness, unable to endure the presence of the light in their dark domain, had wreaked their vengeance upon us, and for the moment seemed to have the upper hand. Would they be able to drive out the light and envelope Kikuyuland in complete darkness once more?")

== Inquest ==
The inquest, opened on 20 January 1930, concluded that Stumpf had died during the night of 2–3 January and recorded asphyxiation as the cause of death. Medical evidence presented at the inquest showed that there were peculiar injuries to Stumpf's body. Edward Grigg, the governor of Kenya, telegraphed the British Colonial Office on the first day of the inquest to tell them: "Medical evidence shows that Miss Stumpf was circumcised in brutal manner and died under the operation. It is clear that circumcision song and dance is being used to work those participating into a dangerous fanaticism." The Times reported in February 1930:

The medical evidence discounted any theory of rape but inclined to the view that certain unusual wounds were due to the deliberate mutilation such as might have been caused by the use of a knife employed by native [sic] in the form of tribal operation.

The significance of this lies in the fact that for many months past certain missions have been making a stand against this tribal ceremony with the result that there have been conflicts with natives, many of whom are most hostile, while agitators have been attempting to make political capital out of the situation.

A verdict was delivered of wilful murder by person or persons unknown, though a member of the Mkamba ethnic group had already been arrested. According to the Africa Inland Mission, the British government had for the previous ten years fingerprinted all black Africans employed in the area by white people. The man's fingerprints had been found on a clock and lamp in Stumpf's home. He was acquitted by the Supreme Court in Nairobi on 26 November 1930. The court found that there was an innocent explanation for the presence of the fingerprints—he might have entered the house after the murder, but before the police arrived—and concluded that there was no evidence that Stumpf had been killed over her opposition to FGM. (Note: The Times (27 November 1930): "It was recalled that the crime was committed at the time of the great native unrest on account of the opposition of the mission to the Kikuyu circumcision ceremony, and it was suggested that it was a reprisal, but the Court found that there was no evidence to support this view. The most direct evidence against the accused was the discovery of his fingerprints on a clock and lamp in Miss Stumpf's room, but in view of the opportunities that the native had of entering the house before the arrival of the police the Judge gave him the benefit of a reasonable doubt.")

== See also ==
- British East Africa
- Happy Valley set
- History of Kenya
- Rift Valley Academy
