= Marion Stevenson =

Scottish missionary with the Church of Scotland Mission

Marion Scott Stevenson
- Born: 18 May 1871; Forfar, Scotland
- Died: 1930; Glasgow, Scotland
- Education: John Watson's Institution; Ministers' Daughters College, Edinburgh; Edinburgh Association for the University Education of Women
- Occupation: Missionary
- Years active: 1907–1929
- Employer: Church of Scotland
- Known for: Opposition to female genital mutilation
- Parent(s): Agnes Barron and Robert Stevenson
- Relatives: William Barron Stevenson (brother)

Marion Scott Stevenson (18 May 1871–1930) was a Scottish missionary with the Church of Scotland Mission in British East Africa (Kenya) from 1907 until 1929.

Stevenson worked at first for the church's Kikuyu mission at Thogoto, then from 1912 for its mission at Tumutumu in Karatina, set up by Rev. Henry Scott and Dr. John Arthur in 1908. She established and ran a girls' school, which became Tumutumu Girls' High School, taught sewing, knitting and hygiene, worked in the hospital, trained teachers, and helped to translate the Bible.

According to theologian James Karanja, citing a Church of Scotland memorandum, in 1929 Stevenson coined the term "sexual mutilation of women" to describe what was then known as female circumcision, a practice of great importance to the Kikuyu people, Kenya's largest tribe. The Kenya Missionary Council followed suit and began referring to it that year as sexual mutilation, rather than as circumcision or initiation. The practice is now widely known as female genital mutilation (FGM).

== Early life ==
Stevenson was born in Forfar, Scotland, to Agnes Barron and her husband, Robert Stevenson. Her older brother, William Barron Stevenson, became Professor of Hebrew and Semitic Languages at the University of Glasgow.

She attended John Watson's Institution and the Ministers' Daughters College in Edinburgh. Unable to study at the University of Edinburgh because she was a woman (they first admitted women in 1893), she went to lectures organized by the Edinburgh Association for the University Education of Women, then studied music and languages in Germany.

== Missionary work ==
Tumutumu mission

Marion Stevenson
with teachers and students, c. 1920

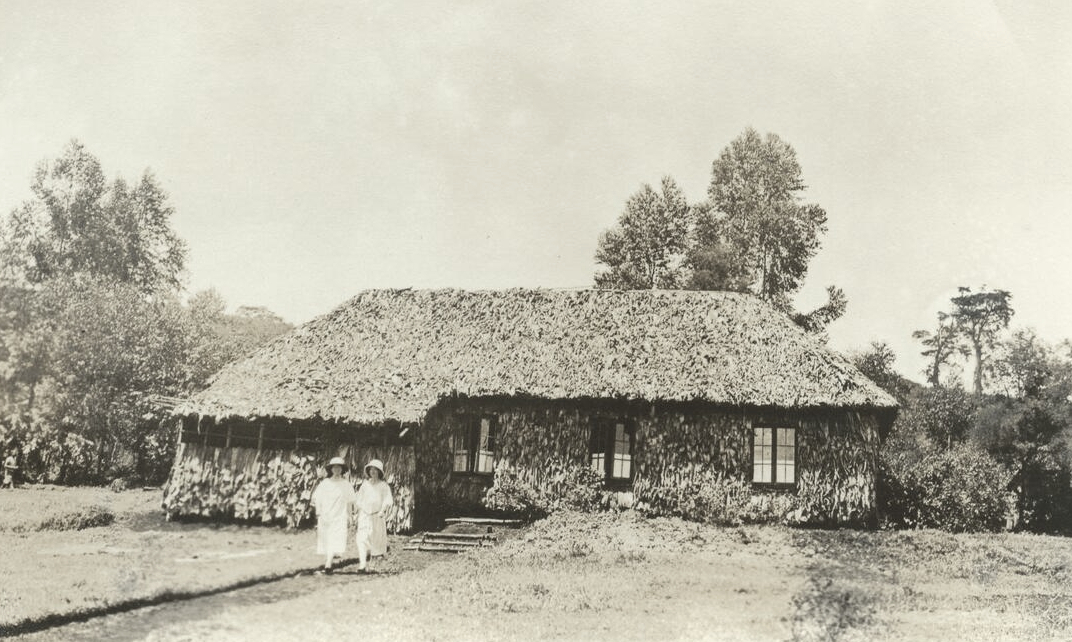
One of the mission's buildings, possibly its hospital

— National Library of Scotland

In 1892 and 1906, Stevenson attended lectures by David Clement Scott on missionary work in Africa; Scott was related to Stevenson's father's first wife. Stevenson subsequently applied, in 1907, for a job in Kikuyu with the Church of Scotland Mission where Scott was then based and he died in that year.

In Kenya, locals called Stevenson Nyaruta, "the one with much saliva who speaks a great deal". She was also known as Nyamacaki or Namachecki, which her biographer, I. G. Scott, interpreted as "one who possesses many cheques" or "the one who lost a cheque-book" in the Kikuyu language. Stevenson acquired the name, Scott wrote in 1932, when her chequebook was stolen and she refused to give evidence against the suspected thief, who had worked in her home. According to Scott:

Her houseboy might have been involved in the inquiry, but she refused to give evidence or to implicate anyone. This boy, who is now one of the ordained ministers, says that she called him "son". It was the turning point of his life. From the incident of the cheque-book came her native name Namazchecki, or One-who-possesses-many-cheques.

Namachecki can also mean "the thin animal" or "the thin one". According to the historian Derek R. Peterson, this reflected local suspicion about Stevenson's diet; rumour had it that she and the other missionaries ate human flesh and used human skulls as drinking cups. Stevenson was thought to have eaten Chief Kariuki, who died in Tumutumu Hospital in 1915.

Stevenson taught Raheli Warigia, the mother of Gakaara wa Wanjaũ, the Kikuyu writer. Warigia and other Tumutumu women formed an organization called the "Shield of Young Girls" to protect girls from FGM. The group wrote: "People are being caught like sheep. One should be allowed to follow her own way of either agreeing to be circumcised or not without being dictated on one's own body."

Stevenson died in Glasgow in 1930.

== See also ==
- Hulda Stumpf
