= Gerry Mackie =

American political scientist

Gerry Mackie (born c. 1960s) is an American political scientist, currently associate professor of political science at the University of California, San Diego (UCSD).

Mackie specializes in the study of harmful social practices, including female genital mutilation. Using ideas from game theory, he has worked with UNICEF and the NGO Tostan to persuade communities to abandon the practice. He is co-director of UNICEF's Learning Program on Changing Social Conventions and Social Norms, and of UCSD's Center on Global Justice. He is the author of Democracy Defended (2003).

== Education and career ==
Mackie obtained his MS in political science from the University of Oregon in 1990 and his PhD from the University of Chicago, in 2000 for a thesis entitled "Is Democracy Impossible? A Preface to Deliberative Democracy."

Before joining UCSD, Mackie was assistant professor of political science at the University of Notre Dame, a research fellow at the Australian National University, and a junior research fellow at St John's College, Oxford.
