= Rose Oldfield Hayes =

American anthropologist

Rose Oldfield Hayes (born 1936) was an American anthropologist at the State University of New York, Buffalo (SUNY Buffalo). After doing fieldwork in Sudan in 1970 interviewing women who had been infibulated, Hayes wrote the first scholarly paper on female genital mutilation (FGM) that used that term, and the first to incorporate information from the women themselves. Published in American Ethnologist in 1975, the paper represented an important step forward in understanding the practice.

== Biography ==
Hayes was born in the United States in 1936 and studied at SUNY Buffalo. In 1975, she was researching the Shinnecock Reservation.

== Selected works ==
- Hayes, Rose Oldfield (1975). "Warfare and the Disappearance of Meroe: A Preliminary Application of Cross-Cultural Findings to Nile Archaeology". In Nettleship, Martin A.; Dalegivens, R.; Nettleship, Anderson (eds.). World Anthropology: War, Its Causes and Correlates. The Hague and Paris: Mouton Publishers. pp. 345–358.
