= Carla Obermeyer =

American medical anthropologist and epidemiologist

Carla Makhlouf Obermeyer is a medical anthropologist and epidemiologist specializing in the study of fertility and HIV. A former associate professor of Population and International Health at Harvard University, Obermeyer was director of the Center for Research on Population and Health at the American University of Beirut as of 2013. She has also worked for the World Health Organization's Department of HIV/AIDS.

Obermeyer is the editor of Family, Gender and Population in the Middle East (1995) and Cultural Perspectives on Reproductive Health (2001). She has called for more rigorous studies into the health effects of female genital mutilation.

== Education ==
- 1988, D.Sc. Harvard School of Public Health, Population, Maternal / Child Health, Behavioral Sciences
- 1983, M.Sc. Epidemiology, American University of Beirut
- 1976, M.A. Anthropology, American University of Beirut
- 1973 B.A. Sociology (with distinction), American University of Beirut
