= Fuambai Ahmadu =

Sierra Leonean-American anthropologist

Fuambai Sia Ahmadu
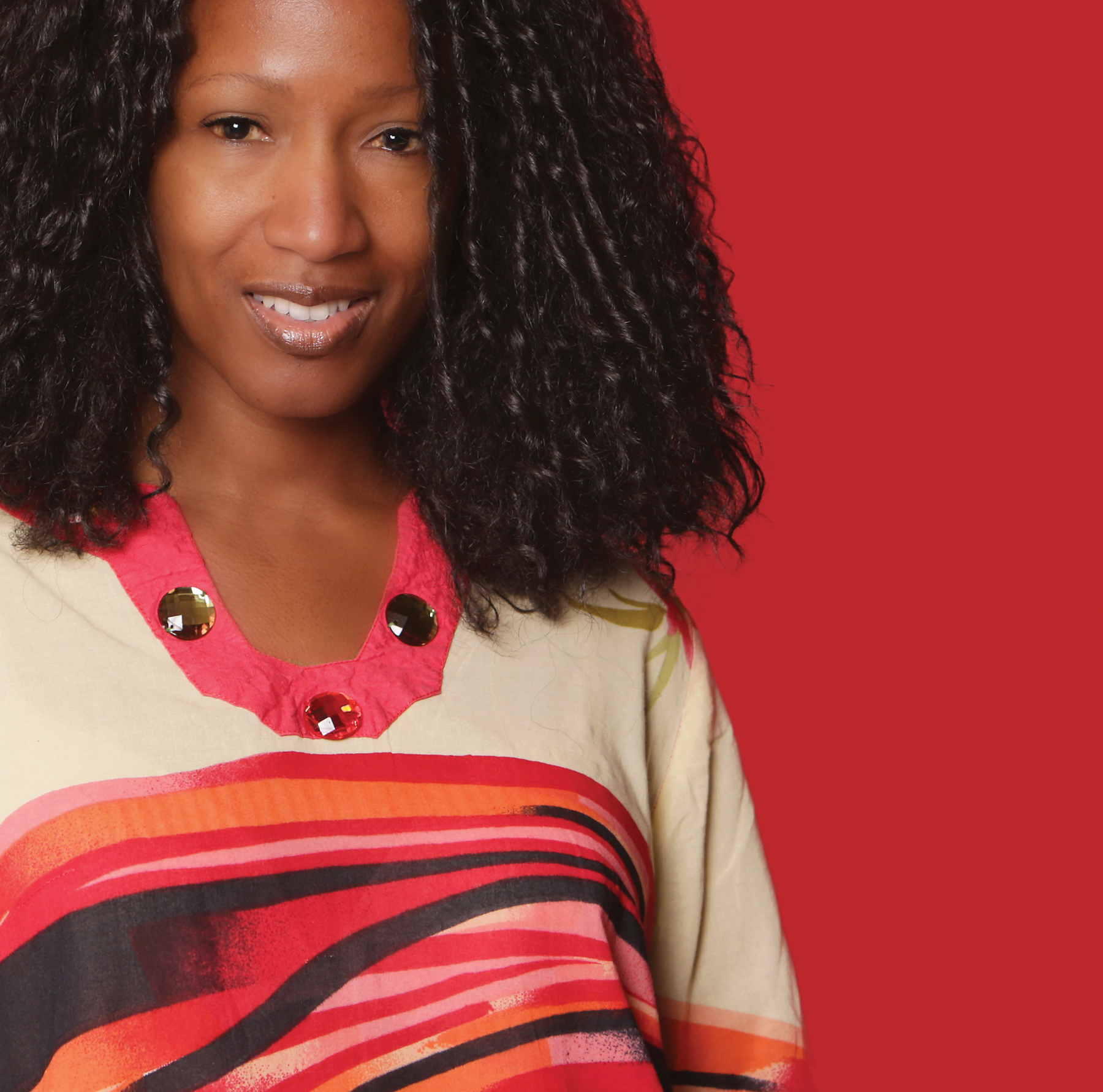
- Education: London School of Economics
- Scientific career
- Fields: Anthropology
- Workplaces: University of Chicago
- Thesis: Cutting the anthill: the symbolic foundations of female and male circumcision rituals among the Mandinka of Brikama, the Gambia (2005)

Fuambai Sia Ahmadu is a Sierra Leonean-American anthropologist. She has worked for UNICEF and the British Medical Research Council in the Gambia.

== Academic career ==
Ahmadu obtained a Doctor of Philosophy (PhD) degree in social anthropology at the London School of Economics in 2005. Her doctoral thesis was titled "Cutting the anthill: the symbolic foundations of female and male circumcision rituals among the Mandinka of Brikama, the Gambia". She undertook post-doctoral work at the Department of Comparative Human Development, University of Chicago.

Ahmadu is known for her work on female genital mutilation (FGM) and, in particular, for her decision as an adult and member of the Kono ethnic group to undergo it as part of initiation into the female-controlled Bundu secret society. Contrary to the position of the World Health Organization, UNICEF and other UN bodies, she has argued that the health risks of most types of FGM are exaggerated, its effect on women's sexuality misunderstood, and that most affected women do not experience it as an oppressive practice. Ahmadu's views are shared by some other anthropologists.

In December 2025, she published a study, alongside other researchers such as Brian Earp, detailing their perceptions of harm of anti-FGM campaigns.
