= Isaac Baker Brown =

English gynaecologist and obstetric surgeon

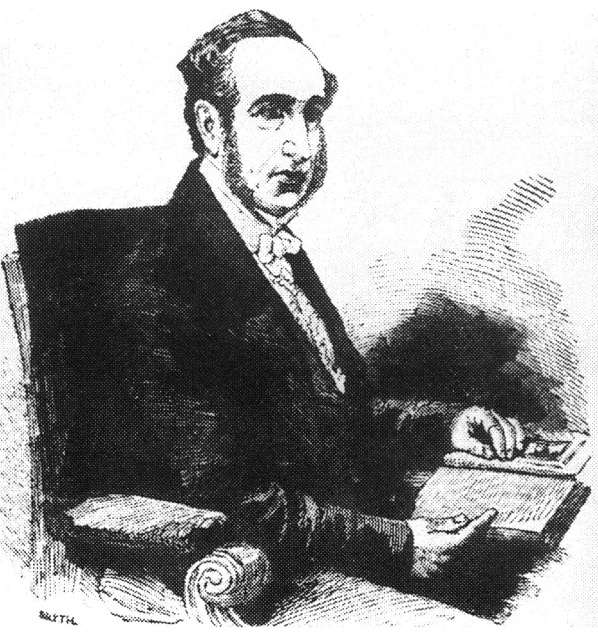
Isaac Baker Brown, c. 1851

Isaac Baker Brown (8 June 1812 – 3 February 1873) was a prominent 19th-century English gynaecologist and obstetrical surgeon. He had a reputation as a specialist in the diseases of women and advocated certain surgical procedures, including clitoridectomies, as cures for epilepsy and hysteria. In 1867, his career ended when he was accused of performing these procedures without consent of the patients. He was subsequently expelled from the Obstetrical Society of London.

== Biography ==
=== Early life ===
Baker Brown was born in 1811 in Colne Engaine, Essex. His parents were farmer Isaac Baker Brown, and Catherine (née Boyer), the daughter of a schoolmaster. He went to school in Halstead, Essex, and became an apprentice to a surgeon called Gibson. He studied at Guy's Hospital, London and specialised in midwifery and diseases of women. He married Anne Rusher Barron on 18 June 1833, in Colchester, Essex. Following Anne's death he married his second wife, Catherine Read, on 21 May 1863.

=== Career ===
Baker Brown opened a medical practice in Connaught Square, London in 1834 and soon became known as a specialist in gynaecology. In 1845, he was one of the founders of St Mary's Hospital, London. He was elected a Fellow of the Royal College of Surgeons in 1848. In 1858 he founded the London Surgical Home for Women and worked on advancing surgical procedures. He began to perform ovariotomies on women, including his own sister. In 1864, he was the first person to describe a surgical treatment for stress incontinence involving a suprapubic cystostomy procedure. He was elected president of the Medical Society of London in 1865. In 1866, Baker Brown described the use of clitoridectomy as a cure for several conditions, including epilepsy, catalepsy and mania, which he attributed to masturbation. In On the Curability of Certain Forms of Insanity, Epilepsy, Catalepsy, and Hysteria in Females, he gave a 70 per cent success rate using this treatment.

During 1866, Baker Brown began to receive negative feedback from within the medical profession from doctors who opposed the use of clitoridectomies, and questioned the validity of Baker Brown's claims of success. An article appeared in The Times in December, which was favourable towards Baker Brown's work but suggested that Baker Brown had treated women of unsound mind. The London Surgical Home was not licensed for this under the Lunacy Act and when the Lunacy Commission began to ask questions, Baker Brown denied it and tried to distance himself from the article. He was also accused of performing clitoridectomies without the consent or knowledge of his patients or their families. In 1867 he was expelled from the Obstetrical Society of London for carrying out the operations without consent.

Baker Brown's career did not recover and he died on 3 February 1873 in London, following a year spent as an invalid.

== Bibliography ==
- 1854: On some Diseases of Women Admitting of Surgical Treatment
- 1866: On the Curability of Certain Forms of Insanity, Epilepsy, Catalepsy, and Hysteria in Females
