= Gakaara wa Wanjaũ =

Kenyan author, historian, and editor

- Born: 1921; Nyeri District, Kenya
- Died: March 30, 2001
- Resting place: Karatina
- Occupations: Gĩkũyu author, historian, editor, publisher
- Known for: contributed to the preservation of indigenous languages

Gakaara wa Wanjaũ (1921–30 March 2001) was a prolific Gĩkũyu author, historian, editor and publisher from Kenya.

== Biography ==
He was born in Nyeri District, Kenya, in 1921 and attended a local primary school in colonial Kenya. He never finished high school and never received tertiary education. Nonetheless, he began a career as a writer in the mid-forties when he started documenting events in his life, albeit discreetly.

Later, his books after having been banned and causing him to be arrested, were passed to be included as part of various syllabi for Gĩkũyu language instruction in the lower grades of primary school—mostly standard one, two, and three. These books mainly included children's short stories—often a collection of folk-lore. Teachers often used the popular introductory texts by writer Fred Kago titled Wĩrute Gũthoma (Foundations of Learning) for the basics and supplemented them with Gakaara's stories.

Gakaara wa Wanjaũ died on 30 March 2001, and was interred in Karatina. Gakaara left a personal archive of more than 7,000 pages, a large proportion of which had been composed during his detention in the 1950s. Works of Gakaara wa Wanjau are archived at the Center of African Studies Library, University of Cambridge which were sourced from the Yale University Library microfilm collection of the Gakaara wa Wanjaũ papers. (Note: 6 microfilm reels are archived at the Centre of African Studies at the University of Cambridge. Those are sourced from the Yale University Library microfilm collection of the Gakaara wa Wanjaũ papers.)

== Work ==
- Riũa Rĩtaanathũa
- O Kĩrĩma Ngaagũa
- Mageria Nomo Mahota
- Ngwenda Ũũũnjurage
- Marebeta Ikũmi ma wendo
- Mwandiki wa Mau Mau Ithaamirio-ini
- Nyĩmbo cia Mau Mau: iria ciarehithirie wiyathi: gũkũngũĩra mĩaka 25 haraambee!: Nyayo!
- Uhoro wa Ugurani
- Mũrutani wa thiomi ithatũ hamwe = Mwalimu wa lugha tatu pamoja = A teacher of three languages together
- Mĩhĩrĩga ya aagĩkũyũ / rĩandĩkĩtwo nĩ Gakaara wa Wanjaũ

== Bibliography ==
- Pugliese, Cristiana (1995). Author, Publisher and Gĩkũyũ Nationalist: The Life and Writings of Gakaara wa Wanjaũ. Bayreuth: Bayreuth African Studies. ISBN 978-3-927510-35-7.
- Elkins, Caroline (2005). Britain's Gulag: The Brutal End of Empire in Kenya. London: Pimlico. ISBN 978-1-84413-548-6.
- Peterson, Derek R (2008). "The Intellectual Lives of Detainees". Journal of African History. 49. Cambridge University Press: 73–91. doi:10.1017/S0021853708003411.
