= Dry sex =

Sexual practice

Dry sex is the sexual practice of having sexual intercourse without vaginal lubrication. Methods employed to remove vaginal lubrication include using herbal anaphrodisiacs, household detergents, antiseptics, by wiping out the vagina with cloths, or by placing leaves in the vagina, amongst other drying methods. Dry sex is associated with increased health risks, against the cultural beliefs that it increases satisfaction for both partners.

Removing or preventing vaginal lubrication through practices associated with dry sex increases friction during intercourse, which may be perceived as increased vaginal tightness, and some believe enhance sexual pleasure for the male partner. Some men who insist on dry sex regard "wet" women as unchaste. Dry sex can be painful for women and men. Dry sex has been documented in South Africa and Zambia, and it has also been reported in Suriname among Afro-Surinamese women.

== Health risks ==
The practice has been linked to the high incidence of HIV/AIDS infection in South Africa. The practice is regarded as increasing the risk of transmitting sexually transmitted diseases (STDs) for both partners, including HIV in a number of ways. Increased friction during intercourse can cause lacerations in vaginal tissue. Drying the vagina also removes the natural antiseptic lactobacilli that combat sexually transmitted diseases. Furthermore, dry sex increases the risk that a condom will break because of the increased friction. It may also result in vaginal inflammation and/or traumatic lesions which in turn may increase the transmission of STDs in other ways.
