= List of women anthropologists =

This is a list of women anthropologists.

| Name | Description | Birth | Death | Image |
|---|---|---|---|---|
| Adeline Masquelier | American anthropologist | 1960 | | |
| Adrienne L. Kaeppler | American anthropologist | 1935-07-26 | 2022-03-05 | |
| Agnes Conway | British archaeologist and historian | 1885 | 1950 | |
| Agnès Humbert | French art historian | 1894-10-12 | 1963-09-19 | |
| Aihwa Ong | Malaysian sociocultural anthropologist | 1950-02-01 | | |
| Aileen Fox | English archaeologist | 1907-07-29 | 2005-11-21 | |
| Alana Cordy-Collins | American archaeologist specializing in Peruvian prehistory | 1944-06-05 | 2015-08-16 | |
| Alanah Woody | American anthropologist | 1956-03-24 | 2007-07-19 | |
| Alba Zaluar | Brazilian anthropologist | 1942-06-02 | 2019-12-19 | |
| Aleksandra Dunin-Wąsowicz | Polish archaeologist | 1932-06-10 | 2015-07-22 | |
| Alessandra Melucco Vaccaro | Italian classical scholar | 1940-04-04 | 2000-08-29 | |
| Alette Schreiner | Norwegian researcher | 1874-05-18 | 1957-12-26 | |
| Alexandra David-Néel | Belgian-French anarchist, Buddhist, explorer, spiritualist, writer | 1868-10-24 | 1969-09-08 | |
| Alice Beck Kehoe | American anthropologist | 1934 | | |
| Alice Cunningham Fletcher | American ethnologist | 1838-03-15 | 1923-04-06 | |
| Alice E. Gillington | British author, poet and gypsy folklorist | 1863 | 1934-05-22 | |
| Alice G. Dewey | American anthropologist | 1928-12-04 | 2017-06-11 | |
| Alice Kober | American classical scholar and archaeologist | 1906-12-23 | 1950-05-16 | |
| Alice Mossie Brues | American physical anthropologist | 1913-10-09 | 2007-01-14 | |
| Alice Roberts | English physician, anatomist, physical anthropologist, television presenter, author | 1973-05-19 | | |
| Alicia P. Magos | Filipino anthropologist | | | |
| Alison Galloway | American forensic anthropologist | | | |
| Alison Spedding | British anthropologist | 1962-01-22 | | |
| Alison Wylie | British-Canadian philosopher of science and archaeologist | 1954 | | |
| Alla Ter-Sarkisiants | Russian anthropologist, historian and ethnographer of Armenia | 1937-04-25 | 2019-08-16 | |
| Amalia Signorelli | Italian cultural anthropologist | 1934-08-06 | 2017-10-25 | |
| Amanda Adams | American author and archaeologist | 1976-09-12 | | |
| Amber Case | American cyborg anthropologist | 1986 | | |
| Amelia Edwards | British novelist, journalist, traveller and Egyptologist | 1831-06-07 | 1892-04-15 | |
| Amélie Kuhrt | British historian | 1944-09-23 | 2023-01-02 | |
| Ana María Groot | Colombian historian, archaeologist and anthropologist | 1952-08-29 | | |
| Angana P. Chatterji | Indian anthropologist, activist, and feminist historian | 1966-11 | | |
| Aninhalli Vasavi | Indian anthropologist | 1958-12-20 | | |
| Anita Álvarez de Williams | American anthropologist, photographer and historian | 1931 | | |
| Anita Brenner | Mexican writer | 1905-08-13 | 1974-12-01 | |
| Ann Dunham | American anthropologist, mother of Barack Obama | 1942-11-29 | 1995-11-07 | |
| Ann Fienup-Riordan | American cultural anthropologist | 1948-10-13 | | |
| Ann Peoples | American anthropologist and camp manager, McMurdo Station | | | |
| Anna Curtenius Roosevelt | American archaeologist | 1946 | | |
| Anna Czekanowska-Kuklińska | Polish musicologist and ethnographer | 1929-06-25 | 2021-10-18 | |
| Anna Lomax Wood | American anthropologist and public folklorist | 1944-11-20 | | |
| Anna Lou Dehavenon | American urban anthropologist | 1926-11-24 | 2012-02-07 | |
| Anna Maria Bietti Sestieri | Italian archaeologist | 1942-12-07 | 2023-07-02 | |
| Anna Maria Di Sciullo | Canadian linguist | 1951 | | |
| Anna Pujol Puigvehi | Spanish archaeologist and historian | 1947-08-16 | | |
| Anna Sadurska | Polish Classical scholar | 1924-09-01 | 2004-03-03 | |
| Anna Tsing | American anthropologist | 1952 | | |
| Annah Robinson Watson | American author and folklorist | 1848 | 1930 | |
| Annamaria Orla-Bukowska | Polish social anthropologist | 1953 | | |
| Anne Allison | American cultural anthropologist | | | |
| Anne Chapman | American anthropologist | 1922-11-28 | 2010-06-12 | |
| Anne Dambricourt-Malassé | French paleoanthropologist | 1959 | | |
| Anne Johnson | British archaeologist | 1951-08-28 | | |
| Anne Macaulay | British musicologist | 1924-03-11 | 1998 | |
| Anne Salmond | New Zealand anthropologist, environmentalist and writer | 1945-11-16 | | |
| Anne Stine Ingstad | Norwegian archaeologist | 1918-02-11 | 1997-11-06 | |
| Anne Walbank Buckland | British anthropologist, ethnologist, and travel writer | 1832 | 1899 | |
| Anne Zeller | American physical anthropologist, specializing in primates | | | |
| Annemarie Mol | Dutch ethnographer and philosopher | 1958-09-13 | | |
| Annette Laming-Emperaire | French archeologist | 1917-10-22 | 1977 | |
| Annette Weiner | American anthropologist | 1933-02-14 | 1997-12-07 | |
| Annie Brisset | Canadian linguist | | | |
| Annie Marion MacLean | early American sociologist | 1869 | 1934 | |
| Annie York | elder of the Nlaka'pamux, ethnobotany contributor | 1904-09-21 | 1991-08-19 | |
| Antonia Arslan | Italian writer/academic of Armenian origins | 1938 | | |
| Antonia Mills | Canadian anthropologist | | | |
| Aud Talle | Norwegian anthropologist | 1944 | 2011-08-16 | |
| Audrey Butt Colson | Social anthropologist | 1926-03-15 | | |
| Audrey Meaney | Archaeologist | 1931-03-19 | 2021-02-14 | |
| Audrey Richards | Anthropologist | 1899-07-08 | 1984-06-29 | |
| Audrey Smedley | American anthropologist | 1930 | 2020-10-14 | |
| Bambi Schieffelin | American linguist | 1945 | | |
| Barbara Freire-Marreco | English anthropologist and folklorist | 1879 | 1967 | |
| Barbara Harrell-Bond | British academic | 1932 | 2018 | |
| Barbara J. Heath | American archaeologist | 1960-12-27 | | |
| Barbara Myerhoff | American filmmaker and anthropologist | 1935-02-16 | 1985-01-07 | |
| Barbara Rylko-Bauer | American anthropologist | 1950 | | |
| Barbara Smuts | American anthropologist | | | |
| Beatrice Blackwood | Anthropologist | 1889-05-03 | 1975-01-29 | |
| Beatrice Blyth Whiting | American anthropologist | 1914-04-14 | 2003-09-29 | |
| Beatrice De Cardi | Archaeologist | 1914-06-05 | 2016-07-05 | |
| Beatrice Medicine | American anthropologist | 1923-08-01 | 2005 | |
| Berit Wallenberg | Swedish anthropologist and archaeologist | 1902 | 1995 | |
| Bertha P. Dutton | American anthropologist, archaeologist, ethnologist | 1903 | 1994 | |
| Bertha Parker Pallan | archaeologist | 1907-08-30 | 1978-10-08 | |
| Bertha Phillpotts | British academic | 1877 | 1932 | |
| Beryl Esembe | Sociologist/Anthropologist/Philanthropist, Christian | 1972-07-10 | | |
| Betsy Bryan | American Egyptologist | 1949 | | |
| Bettina Hauge | Danish anthropologist | 1964 | | |
| Betty Meggers | Archaeologist | 1921-12-05 | 2012-07-02 | |
| Bianca Williams | Black American cultural anthropologist | 1980 | | |
| Birgit Zotz | Austrian writer and anthropologist | 1979-08-07 | | |
| Birgitta Hoffmann | British archaeologist | 1969-05-18 | | |
| Birutė Galdikas | primatologist, conservationist, and ethologist | 1946-05-10 | | |
| Blanche Wheeler Williams | Archeologist and teacher | 1870-01-09 | 1936-12-09 | |
| Bonnie Nardi | American academic | | | |
| Brackette Williams | American anthropologist | 1955 | | |
| Bridget Allchin | English archaeologist, specializing in South Asian archaeology | 1927 | 2017 | |
| Brigitte Bönisch-Brednich | German anthropologist | | | |
| Brit Solli | Norwegian archaeologist | 1959 | | |
| Brunilde Sismondo Ridgway | Italian art historian | 1929-11-14 | 2024-10-19 | |
| Butet Manurung | anthropologist or education activist | 1972-02-21 | | |
| C.H.E. Haspels | Archeologist | 1894-09-15 | 1980-12-25 | |
| Camilla Wedgwood | British anthropologist | 1901-03-25 | 1955-05-17 | |
| Carenza Lewis | British archaeologist | 1963 | | |
| Carla Obermeyer | | | | |
| Carmel Schrire | anthropology and author | 1941-05-15 | | |
| Carmen Baroja | Spanish writer and ethnologist | 1883 | 1950-06-04 | |
| Carmen Guarini | Argentine anthropologist, teacher, film maker | 1953-01-18 | | |
| Carobeth Laird | Ethnologist | 1895-07-20 | 1983-08-05 | |
| Carol Breckenridge | American anthropologist | 1942 | 2009 | |
| Carol Delaney | American anthropologist | 1940-12-12 | | |
| Carol J. Greenhouse | American anthropologist | 1950-01-04 | | |
| Carol Laderman | Medical anthropologist and writer | 1932-10-25 | 2010-07-06 | |
| Carol Meyers | American archaeologist | 1942 | | |
| Carol R. Ember | American cultural anthropologist | 1943-07-07 | | |
| Carole C. Noon | American primatologist | 1949-07-14 | 2009-05-02 | |
| Caroline Furness Jayne | American ethnologist | 1873 | 1909 | |
| Caroline Humphrey | British academic, anthropologist | 1943-09-01 | | |
| Caroline Malone | British archaeologist | 1957 | | |
| Caroline Moser | British sociologist and anthropologist | | | |
| Caroline Wilkinson | British anthropologist | 1965-10-27 | | |
| Carolyn Fluehr-Lobban | American archaeologist and anthropologist | | | |
| Carolyn Hamilton | South African anthropologist and historian | | | |
| Carolyn M. Heighway | British archaeologist | 1943 | | |
| Carolyn Sargent | Medical anthropologist | | | |
| Caterina Magni | Italian-born French archaeologist and anthropologist | 1966 | | |
| Catharine McClellan | American anthropologist | 1921-03-01 | 2009-03-03 | |
| Catherine Berndt | Australian anthropologist | 1918-05-08 | 1994-05-12 | |
| Catherine L. Besteman | American anthropologist | | | |
| Catherine Lutz | American anthropologist | 1952 | | |
| Catherine Morgan | British historian and archaeologist | 1961-10-09 | | |
| Catherine Namono | Ugandan archaeologist | | | |
| Catherine S. Fowler | American anthropologist | | | |
| Cathrine Hasse | Danish anthropologist | 1956 | | |
| Cathy Small | American anthropologist | 1949 | | |
| Cezaria Jędrzejewiczowa | Polish scientist and art historian | 1885-08-02 | 1967-02-28 | |
| Chantal Boulanger | French anthropologist | 1957-01-04 | 2004-12-27 | |
| Charlotte Booth | British archaeologist and Egyptologist | 1975-04-06 | | |
| Charlotte Gower Chapman | American ethnologist | 1902 | 1982 | |
| Charlotte Lewis | character from the American mystery fiction television series Lost | 1971-07-02 | | |
| Charlotte Roberts | bioarchaeologist | 1957 | | |
| Charlotte Viall Wiser | American anthropologist | 1892 | 1981 | |
| Chie Nakane | Japanese anthropologist | 1926-11-30 | 2021-10-12 | |
| Christen A. Smith | Associate professor of anthropology and African and African diaspora studies | | | |
| Christian Maclagan | British antiquary and archaeologist | 1811 | 1901 | |
| Christiane Desroches Noblecourt | French Egyptologist | 1913-11-17 | 2011-06-23 | |
| Christine Niederberger Betton | French archaeologist | | 2001 | |
| Chuni Kotal | Indian Dalit anthropologist | 1965 | 1992 | |
| Cindy Cruz | American ethnographer | | | |
| Claire Barratt | Industrial archaeologist, steam engineer and television presenter | 1974 | | |
| Claire Smith | Australian archaeologist | 1957-07-15 | | |
| Clara Passafari | Argentine anthropologist | 1930-03-20 | 1994 | |
| Clare Selgin Wolfowitz | American anthropologist | 1945-11 | | |
| Clarisa Hardy | Argentinian-born Chilean politician, anthropologist and psychologist | 1945-12-15 | | |
| Claudia Roden | British writer | 1936 | | |
| Claudia Zaslavsky | American ethnomathematician | 1917-01-12 | 2006-01-13 | |
| Clea Koff | Anthropologist | 1972 | | |
| Clémence Royer | French philosopher | 1830-04-21 | 1902-02-06 | |
| Clementina Panella | Archaeologist | | | |
| Cleo Odzer | American writer and anthropologist | 1950-04-06 | 2001-03-26 | |
| Constance Cox | Canadian interpreter | 1881 | 1960 | |
| Constance Goddard DuBois | Ethnographer | | 1934 | |
| Constanza Ceruti | Argentinian anthropologist | 1973-01-06 | | |
| Cora DuBois | anthropologist, academic | 1903-10-26 | 1991-04-07 | |
| Courtney Angela Brkic | American anthropologist and writer | 1972 | | |
| Cristina Rémond | Canadian public servant | 1980 | | |
| Cynthia Beall | American anthropologist | 1949 | | |
| Cynthia Irwin-Williams | Archaeologist | 1936-04-14 | 1990-06-15 | |
| Daisy Bates | Irish Australian journalist known for her work with Aboriginal People | 1859-10-16 | 1951-04-18 | |
| Danielle Stordeur | Archaeologist | 1944 | | |
| Danijela Stefanović | Serbian Egyptologist | 1973-07-09 | | |
| Daphne Berdahl | American anthropologist | 1964-06-14 | 2007-10-05 | |
| Daria Khaltourina | Sociologist and Anthropologist | 1979-01-04 | | |
| Dawn Atkins | Anthropologist | 1962-02-13 | | |
| Dawn Prince-Hughes | American scientist | 1964-01-31 | | |
| Dean Falk | American anthropologist | 1944-06-25 | | |
| Débora Diniz | Brazilian anthropologist | 1970 | | |
| Deborah Fouts | American anthropologist | | | |
| Deborah Hyde | British anthropologist and editor-in-chief | 1965 | | |
| Deborah M. Pearsall | American paleoethnobotany | 1950 | | |
| Denise Schmandt-Besserat | Professor of Art and Archaeology | 1933-08-10 | | |
| Dia Cha | American anthropologist | 1962 | | |
| Dian Fossey | American zoologist, gorilla researcher | 1932-01-16 | 1985-12-27; 1985-12-26 | |
| Diana Kirkbride | British archaeologist | 1915-10-22 | 1997-08-13 | |
| Diane Barwick | Canadian anthropologist | 1938 | 1986 | |
| Diane Bell | Australian writer and anthropologist | 1943-06-11 | | |
| Diane Massam | Canadian linguist | | | |
| Diane Zaino Chase | American archaeologist | 1953 | | |
| Dina Lévi-Strauss | French anthropologist | 1911-02-01 | 1999-02-25 | |
| Dolores Piperno | archaeologist | 1949 | | |
| Donna Gerdts | American linguist | | | |
| Dorinne K. Kondo | Anthropologist | | | |
| Doris Bartholomew | American linguist | 1930 | | |
| Doris Zemurray Stone | American Mesoamericanist | 1909-11-19 | 1994-10-21 | |
| Dorothea Bate | Welsh palaeontologist and archaeozoologist | 1878-11-08 | 1951-01-13 | |
| Dorothea Bleek | German anthropologist and philologist | 1873-03-26 | 1948-06-27 | |
| Dorothy Burr Thompson | American archaeologist | 1900-08-19 | 2001-05-10 | |
| Dorothy D. Lee | American anthropologist | 1905 | 1975-04 | |
| Dorothy E. Smith | Canadian anthropologist | 1926-07-06 | 2022-06-03 | |
| Dorothy Garrod | First female Professor at Cambridge | 1892-05-05; 1892-04-05 | 1968-12-18 | |
| Dorothy Jean Ray | Anthropologist | 1919-10-10 | 2007-12-12 | |
| Dorothy King | American self-described archaeologist and historian | 1975 | | |
| Dorothy Way Eggan | American anthropologist | 1901 | 1965 | |
| Dounia Bouzar | French anthropologist, writer and educator | 1964 | | |
| E. S. Drower | British cultural anthropologist | 1879-12-01 | 1972-01-27 | |
| Edith Durham | British artist | 1863-12-08 | 1944-11-15 | |
| Edith Porada | American art historian | 1912-08-22 | 1994-03-24 | |
| Edith Turner | anthropologist | 1921-06-17 | 2016-06-18 | |
| Eilat Mazar | Israeli archaeologist | 1956-09-10 | 2021-05-25 | |
| Eileen Krige | South African anthropologist | 1905 | 1995 | |
| Eleanor Leacock | anthropologist | 1922 | 1987 | |
| Eleanor Myers | English archaeologist | 1925 | 1996 | |
| Eleanor Robson | British academic | 1969 | | |
| Elena Berezovich | Russian linguist | 1966-01-02 | | |
| Elena Efimovna Kuzmina | Russian archaeologist | 1931-04-13 | 2013-10-17 | |
| Eliane Karp | First Lady of Peru | 1953-09-24 | | |
| Elinor Ochs | American anthropologist | 1944-10-22 | | |
| Elisabeth Croll | Croll [née Sprackett], Elisabeth Joan [Lisa] (1944–2007), Sinologist and anthropologist | 1944-09-21 | 2007-10-03 | |
| Elizabeth Tunstall | American anthropologist | 1972-01-28 | | |
| Elizabeth Brumfiel | Archaeologist | 1945-03-10 | 2012-01-01 | |
| Elizabeth Burgos | Venezuelan anthropologist | 1941 | | |
| Elizabeth Colson | US social anthropologist | 1917-06-15 | 2016-07 | |
| Elizabeth Cowper | Canadian linguist | 1952 | | |
| Elizabeth Fentress | American archaeologist | 1948-10-30 | | |
| Elizabeth French | British archaeologist | 1931 | 2021 | |
| Elizabeth Grant | Australian architect and anthropologist | 1963-08-23 | 2022-07-05 | |
| Elizabeth Jacobs | American anthropologist | 1903 | 1983-05-21 | |
| Elizabeth Kapu'uwailani Lindsey | American actress | 1956-04-17 | | |
| Elisabeth Krämer-Bannow | German ethnologist | 1874-09-29 | 1945-01-09 | |
| Elizabeth Marshall Thomas | American anthropologist and author | 1931-09-13 | | |
| Elizabeth Mertz | American anthropologist | | | |
| Elizabeth Spillius | Anthropologist | 1924-03-03 | 2016-07-04 | |
| Elizabeth Thomas | American Egyptologist | 1907-03-29 | 1986-11-28 | |
| Elizabeth Warnock Fernea | American anthropologist, writer and filmmaker | 1927-10-21 | 2008-12-02 | |
| Elizabeth Wayland Barber | Archaeologist | 1940-12-02 | | |
| Ella Cara Deloria | Yankton Dakota Author | 1889-01-31 | 1971-02-12 | |
| Ella Sophia Armitage | English historian | 1841-03-03 | 1931-03-20 | |
| Ellen Dissanayake | American anthropologist | | | |
| Elli Köngäs-Maranda | Canadian anthropologist | 1932-01-11 | 1982-11-01 | |
| Elsie Clews Parsons | American anthropologist | 1875-11-27 | 1941-12-19 | |
| Emeline Hill Richardson | American archaeologist | 1910-06-06 | 1999-08-29 | |
| Emiko Ohnuki-Tierney | Japanese-born anthropologist | 1934 | | |
| Emiliana Cruz | American anthropologist | 1971-06-30 | | |
| Emilie Demant Hatt | Danish artist | 1873-01-21 | 1958-12-04 | |
| Emily Martin | Anthropologist | 1944-11-07 | | |
| Emily Vermeule | American archaeologist | 1928-08-11 | 2001-02-06 | |
| Erica Lehrer | American anthropologist | 1969 | | |
| Erika Bourguignon | American anthropologist and university teacher (1924-2015) | 1924-02-18 | 2015-02-15 | |
| Erika Simon | German classical archaeologist | 1927-06-27 | 2019-02-15 | |
| Erminie Wheeler-Voegelin | American anthropologist | 1903-04-02 | 1988-07-10 | |
| Erminnie A. Smith | American anthropologist and folklorist | 1836 | 1886-06-09 | |
| Erna Gunther | American anthropologist | 1896; 1896-11-09 | 1982 | |
| Ernestine Friedl | American anthropologist | 1920 | 2015-10-12 | |
| Eslanda Goode Robeson | American anthropologist, author, actor and civil rights activist | 1896-12-12 | 1965-12-13 | |
| Estelle Lazer | Australian archaeologist | | | |
| Esther Boise Van Deman | American archaeologist | 1862-10-01 | 1937-05-03 | |
| Esther de Pommery | Swiss activist | | | |
| Esther Hermitte | Argentine anthropologist | 1921 | 1990 | |
| Esther Newton | Anthropologist | 1940 | | |
| Esther Schiff Goldfrank | American anthropologist | 1896 | 1997-04-23 | |
| Ethel Alpenfels | American anthropologist | 1907 | 1981 | |
| Ethel Bristowe | | 1862 | 1952 | |
| Eugenie Scott | Anthropologist | 1945-10-24 | | |
| Eugenie Sellers Strong | British archaeologist and art historian | 1860-03-25 | 1943-09-16 | |
| Eva Justin | German psychologist | 1909-08-23 | 1966-09-11 | |
| Éva Pócs | Hungarian anthropologist, historian, ethnographer | 1936 | | |
| Eva Verbitsky Hunt | Argentine anthropologist | 1934 | 1980 | |
| Evelyn Byrd Harrison | American art historian | 1920-06-05 | 2012-11-03 | |
| Ewa Klonowski | Polish anthropologist | 1946 | | |
| Fadwa El Guindi | Egyptian-American anthropologist | 1941 | | |
| Faina Petryakova | Ukrainian ethnographer | 1931 | 2002 | |
| Fatimah Jackson | American biological anthropologist | | | |
| Faye Ginsburg | American anthropologist | 1952-10-28 | | |
| Faye V. Harrison | American anthropologist | | | |
| Felicitas Goodman | American linguist and anthropologist | 1914-01-30 | 2005-03-30 | |
| Fiona Caroline Graham | Australian anthropologist | 1961-09-16 | 2023-01-26 | |
| Florence Connolly Shipek | American anthropologist and ethnohistorian | 1918-12-11 | 2003-01-09 | |
| Florence Hawley | Anthropologist | 1906-09-17 | 1991 | |
| Florinda Donner | American writer and anthropologist | 1944-02-15 | | |
| France Martineau | Linguist | 1960 | | |
| France Winddance Twine | American ethnographer | 1960 | | |
| Frances D'Souza, Baroness D'Souza | British academic, life peer | 1944-04-18 | | |
| Frances Densmore | American anthropologist | 1867-05-21 | 1957-06-05 | |
| Frances J. White | American anthropologist | | | |
| Frances Toor | American anthropologist and ethnographer | 1890 | 1956 | |
| Francine Saillant | Canadian anthropologist | 1953 | | |
| Françoise Claustre | French archaeologist | 1937-02-08 | 2006-09-03 | |
| Françoise Henry | Art historian | 1902; 1902-06 | 1982; 1982-02-10 | |
| Françoise Héritier | French anthropologist | 1933-11-15 | 2017-11-15 | |
| Françoise Pommaret | French Tibetologist | 1954 | | |
| Freda Ahenakew | Author | 1932-02-11 | 2011-04-08 | |
| Frederica de Laguna | American ethnologist, anthropologist, and archaeologist | 1906-10-03 | 2004-10-06 | |
| Frédérique Apffel-Marglin | Professor emerita/Anthropology | | | |
| Fuambai Ahmadu | American anthropologist | | | |
| Gabriella Coleman | Internet anthropologist | 1973 | | |
| Gail M. Kelly | American anthropologist | 1933-02-09 | 2005-08-17 | |
| Galia Sabar | Israeli professor of African studies | 1963 | | |
| Halyna Lozko | Ukrainian ethnologist | 1952-02-03 | | |
| Galina Starovoytova | Russian academic and politician | 1946-05-17 | 1998-11-20 | |
| Gayatri Reddy | Anthropologist, professor of gender studies | 1982-06-23 | | |
| Gayle J. Fritz | American paleoethnobotanist | | | |
| Gayle Rubin | American cultural anthropologist, activist, and feminist | 1949 | | |
| Gene Weltfish | American anthropologist and historian | 1902-08-07 | 1980-08-02 | |
| Genevieve Bell | Australian anthropologist | 1967 | | |
| Georgina Born | Musician, academic, anthropologist | 1955-11-15 | | |
| Geraldine Finlayson | Gibraltarian historian | 1960-07-20 | | |
| Geraldine Harris | British Egyptologist | 1951 | | |
| Germaine Dieterlen | French anthropologist | 1903-05-15 | 1999-11-13 | |
| Germaine Tillion | French anthropologist | 1907-05-30 | 2008-04-18; 2008-04-19 | |
| Gertrud Pätsch | German ethnologist and philologist | 1910-01-22 | 1994-12-14 | |
| Gertrude Bell | English writer, traveller, political officer, administrator, archaeologist and spy | 1868-07-14 | 1926-07-12 | |
| Gertrude Blom | Swiss Mesoamericanists | 1901-07-07 | 1993-12-23 | |
| Gertrude Caton–Thompson | British archaeologist | 1888-02-01 | 1985-04-18 | |
| Gertrude M. Godden | British academic | 1867-07-17 | 1947-02-15 | |
| Gillian Cowlishaw | New Zealand-born anthropologist who researches Aboriginal Australian culture and people | 1934-12-19 | | |
| Gina Athena Ulysse | a Haitian-American anthropologist, feminist, poet, performance artist and activist | 1966 | | |
| Ginette Aumassip | | | | |
| Gisela Bleibtreu-Ehrenberg | German ethnologue, sociologue, writer | 1929-08-02 | 2025-02-12 | |
| Gisela Richter | British art historian and archaeologist | 1882-08-14 | 1972-12-24 | |
| Gladys Reichard | American anthropologist | 1893-07-17 | 1955-07-25 | |
| Gladys Tantaquidgeon | Native American anthropologist, Medicine Woman, author | 1899-06-15 | 2005-11-01 | |
| Grace Crowfoot | British archaeologist | 1877 | 1957 | |
| Grete Mostny | Austrian anthropologist and archaeologist (1914-1991) | 1914-09-17 | 1991-12-15 | |
| Gudrun Corvinus | German archaeologist | 1931-12-14 | 2006-01-01 | |
| Guillemette Andreu | French Egyptologist and archaeologist | 1948-08-03 | | |
| Halet Çambel | Fencer, archaeologist | 1916-08-27 | 2014-01-12 | |
| Halleh Ghorashi | Anthropologist | 1962-07-30 | | |
| Hallgerður Gísladóttir | Ethnologist and poet | 1952-09-28 | 2007-02-01 | |
| Hannah Landecker | author and Associate Professor of Sociology at UCLA | 1969 | | |
| Hannah Marie Wormington | American archaeologist | 1914-09-05 | 1994-05-31 | |
| Harriet Boyd-Hawes | American archaeologist | 1871-10-11 | 1945-03-31 | |
| Harriet Cosgrove | American archaeologist | 1887 | 1970 | |
| Heather Botting | Canadian anthropologist | 1948 | | |
| Heather Burke | Australian archaeologist | 1966 | | |
| Heather Horst | American anthropologist | 1975 | | |
| Heather Hurst | American archaeologist | 1976 | | |
| Heather Levi | American anthropologist | | | |
| Heather McKillop | Canadian-American Mesoamericanists | 1953 | | |
| Heather Pringle | Canadian non-fiction author and journalist | | | |
| Heleen Sancisi Weerdenburg | Dutch archaeologist and historian | 1944-05-23 | 2000-05-28 | |
| Helen Codere | cultural anthropologist | 1917-09-10 | 2009-06-05 | |
| Helen Fisher | American anthropologist | 1945-05-31 | 2024-08-17 | |
| Helen Geake | Archaeologist | 1967 | | |
| Helen Leach | New Zealand anthropologist | 1945 | | |
| Helen Perlstein Pollard | American academic | 1946 | | |
| Helena Hamerow | British archaeologist | 1961-09-18 | | |
| Helena Wulff | Anthropologist | 1954-02-07 | | |
| Helene Hagan | American anthropologist | 1939 | | |
| Helene J. Kantor | American archaeologist | 1919-07-15 | 1993-01-13 | |
| Henrietta Moore | British social anthropologist | 1957-05-18 | | |
| Henriette Mertz | American lawyer and history researcher | 1898 | 1985 | |
| Hermine Hartleben | German Egyptologist | 1846-06-02 | 1919-07-18 | |
| Hilary du Cros | Australian archaeologist | | | |
| Hilda Kuper | South African anthropologist | 1911-08-23 | 1992-04-23 | |
| Hilda Lockhart Lorimer | | 1873 | 1954 | |
| Hilda Petrie | British Egyptologist | 1871-06-08 | 1956-11-23 | |
| Hilde Danielsen | Social anthropologist | 1971 | | |
| Hilde Frafjord Johnson | Norwegian diplomat and politician | 1963-08-29 | | |
| Hilma Granqvist | Finnish anthropologist | 1890 | 1972 | |
| Homa Hoodfar | Iranian anthropologist | 1950 | | |
| Honor Frost | Underwater archaeologist | 1917-10-28 | 2010-09-12 | |
| Hortense Powdermaker | American anthropologist | 1900-12-24 | 1970-06-15 | |
| Huguette Dagenais | French-Canadian anthropologist | 1943 | | |
| Ida Halpern | ethnomusicologist | 1910-07-17 | 1987-02-07 | |
| Ilse Schwidetzky | German anthropologist | 1907-09-06 | 1997-03-18 | |
| Ineke van Wetering | Dutch anthropologist | 1934-10-17 | 2011-10-18 | |
| Ingeborg Scheibler | German art historian, archaeologist and anthropologist | 1929-08-31 | | |
| Ingrid Rüütel | First Lady of Estonia | 1935-11-03 | | |
| Irawati Karve | Indian anthropologist and sociologist | 1905-12-15 | 1970-08-11 | |
| Irit Ziffer | Israeli archaeologist and art historian | 1954 | | |
| Irma McClaurin | American anthropologist | | | |
| Isabella Abbott | Educator, ethnobotanist | 1919-06-20 | 2010-10-28 | |
| Jacqueline Roumeguere-Eberhardt | French anthropologist | 1927-11-27 | 2006-03-29 | |
| Jacquetta Hawkes | British archaeologist | 1910-08-05 | 1996-03-18 | |
| Jacqui Wood | British archaeologist | 1950-01-04 | | |
| Jane C. Goodale | American anthropologist | 1926 | 2008 | |
| Jane Dieulafoy | French anthropologist | 1851-06-29; 1851-06-20 | 1916-05-25 | |
| Jane Ellen Buikstra | American anthropologist | 1945 | | |
| Jane Goodall | British primatologist, ethologist, and anthropologist | 1934-04-03 | 2025-10-01 | |
| Jane I. Guyer | British anthropologist | 1943-12-31 | 2024-01-17 | |
| Jane MacLaren Walsh | American anthropologist | | | |
| Janet Bennion | American anthropologist | 1964-10-02 | | |
| Janet D. Spector | American archaeologist | 1944-10-21 | 2011-09-13 | |
| Janet Davidson | New Zealand archaeologist | 1941 | | |
| Janet Roitman | American anthropologist | | | |
| Janice Boddy | Canadian anthropologist | | | |
| Janine R. Wedel | Scholar on international policy | 1957-10-09 | | |
| Jean Briggs | | 1929-05-28 | 2016-07-27 | |
| Jean Comaroff | American anthropologist | 1946-07-22 | | |
| Jean Lave | American anthropologist | | | |
| Jean Schensul | American anthropologist | | | |
| Jeanne Arnold | American archaeologist | | 2022-11-27 | |
| Jeanne Guillemin | American anthropologist | 1943-03-06 | 2019-11-15 | |
| Jennifer Moody | American archaeologist | | | |
| Jessica Greenberg | Anthropologist | | | |
| Jill Pruetz | American anthropologist and primatologist | | | |
| Jill Rosemary Dias | Anglo-Portuguese anthropologist and historian | | | |
| Jo Anne Van Tilburg | American archaeologist | | | |
| Joan Breton Connelly | archaeologist and academic | 1954 | | |
| Joan du Plat Taylor | British archaeologist | 1906-06-26 | 1983-05-21 | |
| Joan Halifax | American Zen Buddhist roshi, anthropologist, ecologist, and civil rights activist | 1942 | | |
| Joan Lee Tu | Linguist | 1981 | | |
| Joan M. Tenenbaum | American academic | 1945 | | |
| Joan Metge | New Zealand anthropologist, academic, educator | 1930-02-21 | 2025-09-17 | |
| Joann Kealiinohomoku | American anthropologist | 1930-05-20 | 2015 | |
| Jocelyne Dakhlia | French historian, anthropologist and academic | 1959 | | |
| Jocelyn Toynbee | British archaeologist and art historian | 1897-03-03 | 1985-12-31 | |
| Johanna Mestorf | German prehistoric archaeologist and Professor | 1828-04-17 | 1909-07-20 | |
| Johnnetta B. Cole | American anthropologist | 1936-10-19 | | |
| Jolan Babus | Hungarian ethnographer and teacher | 1917-10-17 | 1967-05-05 | |
| Jorun Solheim | Anthropologist | 1944-11-18 | | |
| Jovita González | American writer | 1904-01-18 | 1983 | |
| Joyce Marcus | American archaeologist | 1948 | | |
| Joyce Tyldesley | British archaeologist and Egyptologist | 1960-02-25 | | |
| Judith Becker | Ethnomusicologist | 1932-09-03 | | |
| Judith Berman | American writer | 1958 | | |
| Judith E. Glaser | American businesswoman | 1946-06-23 | 2018-11-18 | |
| Judith Lynne Hanna | American anthropologist | 1936 | | |
| Judith Shapiro | American anthropologist | 1942-01-24 | | |
| Judy Birmingham | Australian archaeologist | | | |
| Julia Averkieva | Soviet anthropologist | 1907 | 1980 | |
| Julia Elena Fortún | Bolivian historian | 1929-10-09 | 2016-12-05 | |
| Juliet Morrow | American archaeologist | | | |
| June Helm | anthropologist | 1924-09-13 | 2004-02-05 | |
| June Nash | American anthropologist | 1927 | 2019 | |
| K. Aslihan Yener | Turkish archaeologist | | | |
| Karen Boswall | Filmmaker | | | |
| Karen Ho | American anthropologist | | | |
| Karen Mc Carthy Brown | American anthropologist | 1942 | 2015-03-04 | |
| Karen Nakamura | American academic | 1970-10-23 | | |
| Karen Ramey Burns | forensic anthropologist | | 2012-01-07 | |
| Kari Bruwelheide | American anthropologist | 1967-03-16 | | |
| Karla Poewe | American anthropologist | 1941-01-27 | | |
| Karolyn Smardz Frost | Historian | | | |
| Käte Bosse-Griffiths | Welsh-German Egyptologist | 1910-06-16; 1910-07-16 | 1998-04-04 | |
| Kate Fox | British anthropologist | | | |
| Katharina C. Rebay | Austrian archaeologist | 1977-12-16 | | |
| Katharina Galor | Israeli woman archaeologist | 1966 | | |
| Katharine Elizabeth Dopp | American anthropologist | 1863-03-01 | 1944-03-14 | |
| Katharine Luomala | American anthropologist | 1907-09-10 | 1992 | |
| Katherine Dunham | Dancer, choreographer, songwriter, activist | 1909-06-22 | 2006-05-21 | |
| Katherine Routledge | British archaeologist | 1866-08-11 | 1935-12-13 | |
| Kathleen Gough | British anthropologist | 1925-08-16 | 1990-09-08 | |
| Kathleen Kenyon | British archaeologist | 1906-01-05 | 1978-08-24 | |
| Kathleen M. Adams | American anthropologist | | | |
| Kathleen Musante DeWalt | American anthropologist | | | |
| Kathleen O'Neal Gear | American writer | 1954 | | |
| Kathrine S. French | American anthropologist | 1922-06-05 | 2006-06-14 | |
| Kathryn Woolard | American linguistic anthropologist | 1950 | | |
| Katherine Ann Dettwyler | American anthropologist | 1955 | | |
| Kathy Reichs | American writer, anthropologist, forensic anthropologist | 1948-07-07 | | |
| Katrina Karkazis | anthropologist, bioethicist | | | |
| Katy Gardner | British writer | 1964 | | |
| Katya Gibel Mevorach | American anthropologist | 1952-06-18 | | |
| Kay Warren | American anthropologist | 1947-02-10 | | |
| Keewaydinoquay Peschel | American Ethnobiologist | 1919 | 1999 | |
| Kelly Dixon | American archaeologist | | | |
| Kim Yeshi | French-American anthropologist and tibetologist | 1966 | | |
| Kira Hall | American linguist and anthropologist | 1962-10-10 | | |
| Kirsten Hastrup | Danish anthropologist | 1948–2–20 | | |
| Kris L. Hardin | American anthropologist | 1953-03-07 | 2012-08-21 | |
| Kristen Gremillion | American anthropologist | 1958-11-17 | | |
| Kristen R. Ghodsee | American ethnographer and a Professor of Gender and Women's Studies at Bowdoin College | 1970-04-26 | | |
| Kristina Killgrove | American anthropologist, bioarchaeologist, writer | 1977-03-10 | | |
| L. Taylor Hansen | American writer | 1897-11-30 | 1976-05 | |
| Lady Hester Stanhope | British archaeologist | 1776 | 1839 | |
| Laura Bohannan | Cultural anthropologist | 1922 | 2002-03-19 | |
| Laura Nader | American anthropologist | 1930 | | |
| Laurette Séjourné | French-Mexican scholar in ancient American cultures | 1911-10-19 | 2003-05-25 | |
| LaVerne Jeanne | American linguist | | | |
| Layla AbdelRahim | Canadian comparatist anthropologist and author | | | |
| Lee Ann Newsom | American anthropologist | | | |
| Leela Dube | Indian anthropologist | 1923-03-27 | 2012-05-20 | |
| Leila Badre | Archaeologist | 1943-02-20 | | |
| Leith Mullings | American anthropologist | 1945-04-08 | 2020-12-13 | |
| Lélia Gonzalez | Brazilian activist | 1935-02-01 | 1994-07-10 | |
| Lesley Gill | American anthropologist | | | |
| Leslie Milne | British anthropologist | 1860 | 1932 | |
| Leslie Van Gelder | American archaeologist | 1969 | | |
| Leyla Neyzi | Turkish academic | 1961-07-29 | | |
| Lida Shaw King | American classical scholar and college dean | 1868-09-15 | 1932-01-10 | |
| Lila Abu-Lughod | Anthropologist | 1952-10-21 | | |
| Lilian Hamilton Jeffery | British archaeologist, classical philologist and epigraphist | 1915-01-05 | 1986-09-29 | |
| Lina Fruzzetti | American film director and anthropologist | | | |
| Linda Braidwood | American archaeologist | 1909-10-09 | 2003-01-15 | |
| Linda Dégh | Folklorist | 1918-03-19 | 2014-08-20 | |
| Linda Fierz-David | German philologist | 1891 | 1955 | |
| Linda L. Barnes | American anthropologist | 1953 | | |
| Linda L. Layne | American anthropologist | 1955 | | |
| Linda M. Hunt | Professor of Medical Anthropology | | | |
| Lisa Curran | American tropical forester | | | |
| Lisa Redfield Peattie | American anthropologist | 1924-03-01 | 2018-12-13 | |
| Lisa Rofel | American anthropologist | | | |
| Lisbeth Haas | American historian and anthropologist | | | |
| Lissant Bolton | Australian anthropologist and Keeper of Africa, Oceania and Americas at the British Museum | 1954 | | |
| Lívia Járóka | Hungarian politician | 1974-10-06 | | |
| Liza Dalby | American writer and anthropologist | 1950 | | |
| Lorna Marshall | American anthropologist | 1898-09-14 | 2002-07-08 | |
| Lorraine Copeland | British archaeologist | 1921 | 2013-04-27 | |
| Louise Burkhart | American academic | 1958 | | |
| Louise Lamphere | American anthropologist | 1940 | | |
| Louise Leakey | Kenyan paleontologist | 1972-03-21 | | |
| Lourdes Gutiérrez Nájera | Anthropologist | | | |
| Lucy Goodison | British archaeologist | 1945 | | |
| Lucy Mair | British anthropologist | 1901-01-28 | 1986-04-01 | |
| Lucy Myers Wright Mitchell | American historian and writer on archaeology | 1845-03-20 | 1888-03-10 | |
| Lucy Suchman | British sociologist | | | |
| Lucy Taxis Shoe Meritt | American archaeologist | 1906 | 2003-04-13 | |
| Luisa Accati | Historian, anthropologist, feminist | 1942 | | |
| Luisa Maffi | American anthropologist | | | |
| Lydia Cabrera | Afro-Cuban poet | 1900-05-20 | 1991-09-19 | |
| Lydia T. Black | Ukrainian American anthropologist | 1925-12-16 | 2007-03-12 | |
| Lydia White | Canadian linguist | 1946 | | |
| Lyla Pinch Brock | Canadian Egyptologist | | | |
| Lyn Miles | American anthropologist | 1944-08-05 | | |
| Lynne P. Sullivan | American archaeologist | 1952-12-25 | | |
| Mabel Cook Cole | American anthropologist | 1880-04-18 | 1977-11 | |
| Mabel Lang | American archaeologist | 1917-11-12 | 2010-07-21 | |
| Madawi al-Rasheed | Saudi Arabian academic | 1962 | | |
| Madeleine Colani | French archaeologist | 1866-08-13 | 1943-06-02 | |
| Madeleine Pelletier | physician, psychiatrist, feminist, socialist | 1874-05-18 | 1939-12-29 | |
| Madeline Kneberg Lewis | American anthropologist | 1903 | 1996 | |
| Mai Yamani | Saudi Arabian anthropologist | 1956 | | |
| Makaziwe Mandela | daughter of Nelson Mandela and Evelyn Ntoko | 1954 | | |
| Makereti Papakura | Tuhourangi woman of mana, guide, ethnographer | 1873 | 1930 | |
| Malathi de Alwis | Feminist scholar/activist:International Centre for Ethnic Studies/Colombo/Sri Lanka | 1963-10-06 | 2021-01-21 | |
| Malika Zeghal | American academic | 1965 | | |
| Marcela Lagarde | Mexican academic, author, researcher, anthropologist, feminist activist and politician | 1948-12-30 | | |
| Marcia C. Inhorn | American medical anthropologist | 1957 | | |
| Marcia Langton | Aboriginal scholar and activist | 1951-10-31 | | |
| Marcia Theophilo | Brazilian poet | 1941 | | |
| Margaret B. Blackman | American anthropologist | 1944 | | |
| Margaret Bender | American anthropologist | | | |
| Margaret Conkey | American archaeologist | 1943 | | |
| Margaret Elizabeth Ashley-Towle | American archaeologist | 1902-01-12 | 1985-11-02 | |
| Margaret Hasluck | British scholar | 1885-06-18 | 1948-10-18 | |
| Margaret Lantis | U.S. Anthropologist | 1906-09-01 | 2006-09-08 | |
| Margaret Lock | anthropologist | 1936 | | |
| Margaret Mead | American anthropologist | 1901-12-16 | 1978-11-15 | |
| Margaret Murray | British Egyptologist | 1863-07-13 | 1963-11-13 | |
| Margaret Rule | British archaeologist | 1928-09-27 | 2015-04-09 | |
| Margarete Bieber | Art historian | 1879; 1879-07-31 | 1978; 1978-02-25 | |
| Margarethe Lenore Selenka | German academic | 1860 | 1923 | |
| Margherita Guarducci | Italian archaeologist and epigraphist | 1902-12-20 | 1999-09-02 | |
| Margrét Hermanns-Auðardóttir | Icelandic archaeologist | | | |
| Marguerite Dupire | French ethnologist | 1920-10-12 | 2015-03-04 | |
| Mari Lyn Salvador | Anthropologist | 1943-06-16 | 2017-10-23 | |
| Maria Czaplicka | Polish anthropologist | 1884-10-25 | 1921-05-27 | |
| Marianne Nøhr Larsen | Danish anthropologist | 1963-03-26 | | |
| María Elisa Velázquez Gutiérrez | Mexican anthropologist | | | |
| Maria Fadiman | Botanist | 1969-07-04 | | |
| Maria Reiche | Peruvian archaeologist | 1903-05-15 | 1998-06-08 | |
| Maria Teschler-Nicola | Austrian human biologist, anthropologist and ethnologist | 1950 | | |
| Marianne Gullestad | Norwegian anthropologist | 1946-03-28 | 2008-03-10 | |
| Marie-Claire Foblets | anthropologist, lawyer, professor | 1959-11-04 | | |
| Marie-Françoise Guédon | Canadian anthropologist | | | |
| Marie-Lucie Tarpent | Canadian linguist | 1941-11-09 | | |
| Marija Gimbutas | Lithuanian-American archaeologist | 1921-01-23 | 1994-02-02 | |
| Marija Makarovič | Ethnologist | 1930-08-15 | | |
| Marija Šuštar | Slovenian ethnochoreologist and folklorist | 1905-01-12 | 1989-01-27 | |
| Marika Moisseeff | French anthropologist and psychiatrist | | | |
| Marilyn Houlberg | American anthropologist and photographer | 1939-07-17 | 2012-06-29 | |
| Marilyn Ivy | American anthropologist | | | |
| Marilyn Strathern | British anthropologist | 1941-03-06 | | |
| Marina Cunin | social anthropologist | | | |
| Marion Elizabeth Blake | American classical scholar | 1892-03-23 | 1961-09-11 | |
| Mariza Corrêa | Brazilian anthropologist | 1945-12-01 | 2016-12-27 | |
| Marjan Mashkour | Iranian archaeologist | | | |
| Marjorie F. Lambert | American anthropologist and archaeologist | 1908-06-13 | 2006-12-16 | |
| Marjorie Halpin | American-Canadian anthropologist | 1937 | 2000 | |
| Marjorie Shostak | American anthropologist | 1945-05-11 | 1996-10-06 | |
| Marta Lamas | Argentinian anthropologist | 1947 | | |
| Marta Turok | Mexican anthropologist | 1952 | | |
| Martha Crago | Canadian linguist | | | |
| Martha Kaplan | American anthropologist | 1957 | | |
| Martha Rhoads Bell | American archaeologist | 1941-04-27 | 1991-11-12 | |
| Martha Warren Beckwith | American folklorist and ethnographer | 1871-01-19 | 1959-01-28 | |
| Martine Franck | Belgian photographer | 1938-04-02 | 2012-08-16 | |
| Mary Albright | | | | |
| Mary Ann Ochota | British broadcaster and anthropologist | 1981-05-08 | | |
| Mary Cabot Wheelwright | American anthropologist | | 1958-07-29 | |
| Mary Catherine Bateson | American anthropologist | 1939-12-08 | | |
| Mary Catherine Ferguson | Irish writer and archaeologist | 1823 | 1905 | |
| Mary Doria Russell | American novelist | 1950-08-19 | | |
| Mary Douglas | British anthropologist | 1921-03-25 | 2007-05-16 | |
| Mary Frere | English author | 1845-08-11 | 1911-03-02 | |
| Mary Hamilton Swindler | archaeologist | 1884-01-01 | 1967-01-16 | |
| Mary Leakey | British paleoanthropologist | 1913-02-06 | 1996-12-09 | |
| Mary Lindsay Elmendorf | American applied anthropologist | 1917 | 2017 | |
| Mary Lou Ridinger | American archaeologist | 1945 | | |
| Mary-Russell Ferrell Colton | American artist, author, educator | 1889-03-25 | 1971-07-26 | |
| Matilda Coxe Stevenson | Ethnologist | 1849-05-12 | 1915-06-24 | |
| Maud Cunnington | British archaeologist | 1869-09-24 | 1951-02-28 | |
| Maud Oakes | American ethnologist | 1903 | 1990 | |
| Maxine Margolis | American anthropologist | | | |
| Maya Haïdar Boustani | Archaeologist | | | |
| Meave Leakey | Archaeologist | 1942-07-28 | | |
| Melba Padilla Maggay | writer and social anthropologist | 1950-09-10 | | |
| Mercedes Doretti | Argentine anthropologist | 1959 | | |
| Mercedes Fernández-Martorell | Spanish writer and anthropologist | 1948-11-25 | | |
| Meredith Small | American anthropologist | 1950-11-20 | | |
| Merrill Swain | language scholar | | | |
| Merryl Wyn Davies | Welsh Muslim scholar | 1948-06-23 | | |
| Micaela Portilla | Spanish anthropologist | 1922-07-30 | 2005-10-08 | |
| Michelle Rosaldo | American anthropologist | 1944 | 1981 | |
| Mildred Trotter | American anthropologist | 1899-02-03 | 1991-08-23 | |
| Mildred Mott Wedel | American archaeologist, anthropologist, and ethnohistorian of the Great Plains | 1912-09-07 | 1995-09-04 | |
| Minou Tavárez Mirabal | Congresswoman | 1956-08-31 | | |
| Miranda Aldhouse-Green | British archaeologist and academic | 1947-07-24 | | |
| Mireya Mayor | American anthropologist | 1973 | | |
| Miriam Tildesley | Tildesley, Miriam Louise (1883–1979), anthropologist | 1883-07-01 | 1979-01-31 | |
| Miriyam Aouragh | Dutch anthropologist | 1972-11-18 | | |
| Miyako Inoue | American linguistic anthropologist | 1962 | | |
| Mizuko Ito | Japanese cultural anthropologist | 1968-07-22 | | |
| Mona Bhan | cultural anthropologist | | | |
| Mónica Pellecer Alecio | Guatemalan archaeologist | | | |
| Monica Wilson | South African anthropologist | 1908-01-03 | 1982-10-26 | |
| Montgomery McFate | Anthropologist | 1966-01-08 | | |
| Muazzez İlmiye Çığ | Turkish female sumerologist | 1914-06-20 | 2024-11-17 | |
| Muhibbe Darga | Turkish archaeologist | 1921-06-13 | | |
| Myra Shackley | British archaeologist | 1949 | | |
| Myrna Gopnik | Canadian psychologist and linguist | | | |
| Myrna Mack | Guatemalan anthropologist | 1949-10-24 | 1990-09-11 | |
| Nadia Abu El Haj | Academic | 1962 | | |
| Nancy Abelmann | American anthropologist | 1959 | | |
| Nancy Dupree | American archaeologist | 1927 | | |
| Nancy Oestreich Lurie | American anthropologist | 1924-01-29 | | |
| Nancy Romero-Daza | | | | |
| Nancy Scheper-Hughes | American anthropologist | 1944 | | |
| Nancy Turner | Canadian ethnobiologist | 1947 | | |
| Natalia Polosmak | Russian archaeologist | 1956-09-12 | | |
| Natalie Curtis | American ethnomusicologist | 1875-04-26 | 1921-10-23 | |
| Nathalie Beaux-Grimal | French Egyptologist | 1960 | | |
| Nathalie Luca | French anthropologist | 1966 | | |
| Niara Sudarkasa | American anthropologist | 1938-08-14 | | |
| Nicky Milner | British archaeologist | | | |
| Nicole Loraux | French historian | 1943-04-26 | 2003-04-06 | |
| Nicolette Bethel | Bahamian anthropologist | | | |
| Niède Guidon | Brazilian archaeologist | 1933-03-12 | | |
| Nina Etkin | American anthropologist | 1948-06-13 | 2009-01-26 | |
| Nina Frances Layard | British writer and archaeologist | 1853 | 1935 | |
| Nina Gagen-Torn | Russian writer and historian | 1900-12-02 | 1986-06-04 | |
| Nina Jablonski | anthropologist and palaeobiologist, known for her research into the evolution of skin color in humans | 1953-08-20 | | |
| Nita Kumar | American anthropologist | | | |
| Nora Ahlberg | Professor | 1952 | | |
| Norma Mendoza-Denton | sociolinguist and anthropologist | 1968 | | |
| Odette du Puigaudeau | French ethnologist | 1894-07-20 | 1991-07-19 | |
| Odille Morison | Canadian linguist | 1855-07-17 | | |
| Olga F. Linares | Panamanian–American academic anthropologist and archaeologist | 1936-11-10 | 2014-12-02 | |
| Olga Najera-Ramirez | American anthropologist | | | |
| Olive Pink | Australian botanical illustrator, anthropologist, gardener, and activist for aboriginal rights | 1884-03-17 | 1975-07-06 | |
| Olivia Harris | Social anthropologist | 1948-08-26 | 2009-04-09 | |
| Orly Goldwasser | Israeli Egyptologist | | | |
| Paloma Gay y Blasco | Social anthropologist | | | |
| Pamela Erickson | Medical anthropologist | 1951-04-12 | | |
| Patricia Alice Shaw | Canadian linguist | | | |
| Patricia Barchas | Anthropologist and behavioral neurobiologist | | 1993-07-06 | |
| Patricia Birley | British archaeologist | 1948-06-27 | | |
| Patricia Tovar | Colombian/US Anthropologist | | | |
| Patricia Sawin | American anthropologist | | | |
| Patricia Wright | American primatologist | 1944-09-10 | | |
| Patricia Zavella | anthropologist and professor at the University of California, Santa Cruz | | | |
| Patty Jo Watson | anthropologist | | | |
| Pauline Turner Strong | American anthropologist | | | |
| Pearl Primus | American dancer and choreographer | 1919-11-29 | 1994-10-29 | |
| Penelope Wilson | British Egyptologist | | | |
| Penny Wolin | American photographer | 1953-06-05 | | |
| Phyllis Kaberry | Australian anthropologist | 1910-09-17 | 1977-10-31 | |
| Phyllis Morse | American archaeologist | 1934 | | |
| Phyllis Williams Lehmann | American archaeologist | 1912-11-12 | 2004-09-29 | |
| Pirkko-Liisa Lehtosalo-Hilander | Finnish archaeologist | | | |
| Polly Hill | British social anthropologist | 1914-07-14 | 2005-08-21 | |
| Polly Schaafsma | American archaeologist | | | |
| Priscilla Reining | American anthropologist | 1923-03-11 | 2007-07-19 | |
| Prudence Hero Napier | British zoologist | | 1997-06-06 | |
| Rae Bridgman | Canadian writer | | | |
| Raquel Brailowsky | Puerto Rican anthropologist | | | |
| Rayna Rapp | professor of anthropology at New York University, specializing in gender, reproduction, health and culture, science and technology | | | |
| Rebecca Grinter | American computer scientist | | | |
| Regina Bendix | Swiss academic | 1958-05-31 | | |
| Regna Darnell | Canadian anthropologist | | | |
| Regula Tschumi | Swiss ethnologist | 1957 | | |
| Reina Torres de Araúz | Argentinian anthropologist | 1932-10-30 | 1982-02-26 | |
| Renée Friedman | American Egyptologist | | | |
| Rhoda Bubendey Métraux | Anthropologist | 1914 | 2003 | |
| Riane Eisler | Austrian sociologist | 1931-07-22 | | |
| Rita El Khayat | Moroccan anthropologist | 1944 | | |
| Rita P. Wright | American anthropologist | | | |
| Rivke Jaffe | Dutch anthropologist and professor | 1978 | | |
| Roberta Gilchrist | British archaeologist | 1965 | | |
| Rosalind Moss | British Egyptologist | 1890-09-21 | 1990-04-22 | |
| Rose Mary Allen | Curaçaoan anthropologist | | | |
| Rose Oldfield Hayes | American anthropologist | | | |
| Rosemary Cramp | British archaeologist | | | |
| Rosemary Firth | Anthropologist | 1912 | 2001-07-09 | |
| Ruth Amiran | Israeli archaeologist | 1914-12-08 | 2005-12-14 | |
| Ruth Behar | Jewish Cuban American writer | 1956-11-12 | | |
| Ruth Benedict | American anthropologist and folklorist | 1887 | 1947 | |
| Ruth Bunzel | American anthropologist | 1898-04-18 | 1990-01-14 | |
| Ruth Cardoso | Brazilian anthropologist | 1930-09-19 | 2008-06-24 | |
| Ruth Cernea | American anthropologist | 1934 | 2009 | |
| Ruth DeEtte Simpson | American archaeologist | 1918-05-06 | 2000-01-19 | |
| Ruth Hill Useem | American sociologist | 1915-05-31 | 2003-09-10 | |
| Ruth Landes | American anthropologist | 1908-10-08 | 1991-02-11 | |
| Ruth Sawtell Wallis | American academic and physical anthropologist | 1895-03-15 | 1978-01-21 | |
| Ruth Shady | Peruvian anthropologist | 1946-12-24 | | |
| Ruth Tringham | British archaeologist | 1940-10-14 | | |
| Ruth Underhill | American anthropologist | 1883-08-22 | 1984-08-15 | |
| S. Lochlann Jain | American anthropologist | | | |
| Saba Mahmood | American anthropologist | 1962 | | |
| Sabina Magliocco | American folklorist | 1959-12-30 | | |
| Sabine Gaudzinski-Windheuser | German anthropologist, paleontologist, archaeologist and prehistorian | 1965-06-25 | | |
| Sada Mire | Somalian archaeologist | 1977 | | |
| Saddeka Arebi | Anthropologist, author | | 2007-07 | |
| Safi Faye | Ethnologist and film director | 1943-11-22 | | |
| Salima Ikram | Pakistani Egyptologist | 1965 | | |
| Sally Falk Moore | American anthropologist | 1924 | | |
| Sally Larsen | American artist | 1954 | | |
| Sally Price | American anthropologist | 1943-09-16 | | |
| Samar Minallah | Anthropologist and Documentary filmmaker. | 1970 | | |
| Sandra Morgen | American anthropologist | 1950-03-31 | 2016-09-29 | |
| Sara C. Bisel | American archaeologist and anthropologist | 1932-05-13 | 1996-02-04 | |
| Sara Yorke Stevenson | American archaeologist and Egyptologist | 1847-02-19 | 1921-11-14 | |
| Sarah Blaffer Hrdy | American anthropologist and primatologist | 1946-07-11 | | |
| Sarah F. Maclaren | Italian sociologist and anthropologist | 1964-06-04 | | |
| Sarah Franklin | American anthropologist | 1960-11-09 | | |
| Sarah Green | Social anthropologist | 1961-03-09 | | |
| Sarah Lamb (anthropologist) | American cultural anthropologist | 1960 | | |
| Sarah J. Mahler | Anthropologist | 1959-09-08 | | |
| Sarah Milledge Nelson | American archaeologist | 1931 | | |
| Sarah Parcak | American archaeologist and Egyptologist | 1979 | | |
| Selma Al-Radi | Iraqi archaeologist | 1939-07-23 | 2010-10-07 | |
| Seodi White | Malawian lawyer, activist, feminist, anthropologist | | | |
| Setha Low | American anthropologist | 1948-03-14 | | |
| Shana Poplack | Canadian linguist | | | |
| Shannon Lee Dawdy | American anthropologist and archaeologist | | | |
| Sharada Srinivasan | Indian academic | | | |
| Sharon Claydon | Australian politician | 1964-04-26 | | |
| Sheila Kitzinger | British activist | 1929-03-29 | 2015-04-11 | |
| Shelly Errington | American photographer | | | |
| Shereen Ratnagar | Indian archaeologist | | | |
| Sherry Ortner | American anthropologist | 1941-09-19 | | |
| Shirley Heath | American linguist and anthropologist | 1939-07-26 | | |
| Sidney Robertson Cowell | American ethnographer | 1903 | 1995 | |
| Signithia Fordham | American anthropologist | | | |
| Smadar Lavie | Israeli anthropologist | | | |
| Sohini Ray | Indian anthropologist | 1966-08-25 | | |
| Solveig Nordström | Archaeologist | 1923 | | |
| Sondra Hale | American anthropologist | | | |
| Sonia Álvarez Leguizamón | Argentinian anthropologist | 1954-01-16 | | |
| Sonia Mary Cole | British anthropologist | 1918 | 1982 | |
| Sophie Bledsoe Aberle | American anthropologist, physician and nutritionist | 1896-07-21 | 1996-10 | |
| Stine Rossel | Danish archaeologist | 1975 | 2007-10-20 | |
| Suad Joseph | American anthropologist | 1943-09-06 | | |
| Sue Black | Forensic anthropologist | 1961-05-07 | | |
| Sue Hamilton | British archaeologist | | | |
| Sue Hendrickson | American paleontologist and archeologist | 1949-12-02 | | |
| Sue Savage-Rumbaugh | psychologist | 1946 | | |
| Sula Benet | Polish anthropologist | 1903 | 1982 | |
| Sumaya bint El Hassan | Jordanian princess | 1971-05-14 | | |
| Susan Cachel | American anthropologist | | | |
| Susan D. Gillespie | American Mesoamericanist | 1952 | | |
| Susan E. Alcock | Archaeologist | | | |
| Susan Gal | Anthropologist and linguist | 1949 | | |
| Susan Hirsch | Legal anthropologist | | | |
| Susan Irene Rotroff | American archaeologist | | | |
| Susan Kane | American archaeologist | | | |
| Susan M. Ervin-Tripp | American linguist | 1927-06-27 | | |
| Susan Visvanathan | Sociologist and Fiction Writer | 1957 | | |
| Susana Pinilla | Peruvian anthropologist | 1954 | | |
| Susanne Bickel | French Egyptologist | 1960 | | |
| Susanne Osthoff | German archaeologist | 1962-03-07 | | |
| Susanne Schröter | German anthropologist | 1957-09-24 | | |
| Suzanna W. Miles | American Mayanist | 1922 | 1966 | |
| Svetlana Pletneva | Russian historian and archaeologist | 1926-04-20 | 2008-11-20 | |
| Sydel Silverman | American anthropologist, writer, educator, and administrator | 1933 | | |
| Sylvia Leith-Ross | English anthropologist and writer | 1884 | 1980 | |
| Sylvia M. Broadbent | American anthropologist | 1932 | 2015-07-30 | |
| Taisha Abelar | Author and anthropologist | 1944 | 1998-04-29 | |
| Tamasin Ramsay | Australian actress | 1967 | | |
| Tanya Luhrmann | American anthropologist | 1959 | | |
| Tatiana Proskouriakoff | American Mayanist scholar | 1909-01-23 | 1985-08-30 | |
| Temperance "Bones" Brennan | fictional human | 1976 | | |
| Teresa Giménez Barbat | Anthropologist | 1955 | | |
| Teresa Porzecanski | Uruguayan anthropologist | 1945 | | |
| Theodora Kroeber | American anthropologist | 1897-03-24 | 1979-07-04 | |
| Theresa Goell | American archaeologist | 1901-07-17 | 1985-12-18 | |
| Tina Lasisi | Biological anthropologist | | | |
| Tullia Magrini | Italian anthropologist | 1950-04-15 | 2005-07-24 | |
| Unni Wikan | Norwegian anthropologist | 1944-11-18 | | |
| Ursula Cowgill | American biologist and anthropologist | 1927-11-09 | | |
| Ursula Graham Bower | British anthropologist | 1914-05-15 | 1988-11-12 | |
| Ursula McConnel | Australian anthropologist | 1888-10-27 | 1957-11-06 | |
| Uzma Z. Rizvi | American anthropologist and archeologist of Ancient Near East studies | 1973 | | |
| Val Curtis | British scientist | | | |
| Veena Das | Indian anthropologist | 1945 | | |
| Vera Grabe | Colombian politician and anthropologist | 1951 | | |
| Véréna Paravel | French anthropologist and artist | 1971-04-21 | | |
| Veronica Seton-Williams | Australian anthropologist and archaeologist (1910-1992) | 1910-04-20 | 1992-05-29 | |
| Vibha Tripathi | Indian archaeologist | 1948 | | |
| Victoria Wyatt | American art histotrian | 1956-08-03 | | |
| Vilma Sindona Eichholz | Canadian linguist and Esperantist | 1926 | 1995-07-15 | |
| Viola Garfield | American anthropologist | 1899-12-05 | 1983-11-25 | |
| Virginia Abernethy | Professor | 1934 | | |
| Virginia Grace | American archaeologist | 1901 | 1994-05-22 | |
| Virginia Gutiérrez de Pineda | | 1921-11-04 | 1999-09-02 | |
| Virginia R. Domínguez | American anthropologist | 1952 | | |
| Vronwy Hankey | British archaeologist | 1916-09-05 | 1998-05-11 | |
| Wendy Ashmore | American archaeologist | | | |
| Wendy Fonarow | American anthropologist | | | |
| Wendy Orent | American anthropologist | | | |
| Wendy Rose | anthropologist, poet, painter | 1948-05-07 | | |
| Wilhelmina Feemster Jashemski | American archaeologist | 1910-07-10 | 2007-12-24 | |
| Winifred Brunton | British and South African artist and Egyptologist | 1880-05-06 | 1959-01-29 | |
| Winifred Lamb | British art historian | 1894; 1894-11-02 | 1963; 1963-09-16 | |
| Yeda Pessoa de Castro | Brazilian ethnolinguist | 1937 | | |
| Yolanda Murphy | American anthropologist | 1925 | | |
| Zagorka Golubović | Yugoslav/Serbian sociologist | 1930-03-08 | | |
| Zainab Bahrani | Iraqi archaeologist | 1962-08-29 | | |
| Zakia Zouanat | Moroccan anthropologist (1957-2012) | 1957 | 2012-08-30 | |
| Zalpa Bersanova | Russian writer | | | |
| Zeineb Benzina | Tunisian anthropologist and archaeologist | | | |
| Zelia Nuttall | American archaeologist and anthropologist | 1857-09-06 | 1933-04-12 | |
| Ziba Mir-Hosseini | Iranian anthropologist | 1952-04-03 | | |
| Zora Neale Hurston | American folklorist, novelist, short story writer | 1891-01-07 | 1960-01-28 | |
| Zsófia Torma | Hungarian archaeologist | 1832-09-26 | 1899-11-14 | |

== See also ==
- List of anthropologists
- Lists of women scientists
- Lists of women in STEM fields
- Lists of women by occupation
