= Alessandra Melucco Vaccaro =

Italian classical scholar

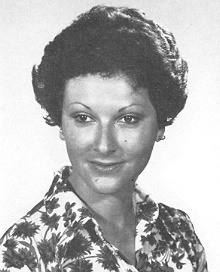
Alessandra Melucco Vaccaro

Alessandra Melucco Vaccaro (4 April 1940 in Rome – 29 August 2000 in Rome) was an Italian historian and archaeologist. Her main activity was in the three fields in which she made significant innovations - the High Middle Ages, archaeological restoration, and environment and landscape. President Carlo Azeglio Ciampi conferred the Medaglia d'Oro for culture and art in Vaccaro's memory in February 2001.

== Personal life ==
Alessandra Vaccaro was born at Rome on 4 April 1940 to a notable middle class Roman family. Her grandfather, Michelangelo Vaccaro, was a university professor who wrote a text fundamental to criminal anthropology and became a senator and head of cabinet under the Crispi government. Her father was a chemist who was an international expert on prophylaxis, and her mother, Emerenziana, was director of the Istituto di Patologia del Libro. In 1965 she married Gianfranco Melucco, a lawyer.

== Career ==
Vaccaro enrolled in the literature faculty of La Sapienza university at Rome, where she studied Greek and Roman archaeology under Ranccio Bianci Bandinelli, and specialised in archaeology at the Scuola Nazionale di Archeologia. In 1962 to 1963, Vaccaro took part in excavations at the Etruscan sanctuary of Pyrgi (today S. Severa) and at the Centro Sperimentale di Archeologia Sottomarina.

From 1964 she won a bursary to study at the Scuola Archeologica Italiana di Atene and, in 1965, she worked on the publication of the Annuario di Storia dell'Arte edited by the Biblioteca di Archeologia e Storia dell'Arte di Roma, and took charge of a sector of the excavation at Pyrgi, and the publication of the 'vernice nera' and Hellenistic pottery. Vaccaro joined the Amministrazione delle Antiquita e Belle Arti in 1965, where she directed a series of excavations including, from 1970 to 1974, those at the Duomo Vecchio di Arezzo and, in 1971, those at the Longobardi necropolis of Chuisi-Arcisi. Here she widened her interests to take on the reorganisation and restoration of the Roman portraits in the Museo Archaeologico di Firenze; the High Medieval era was a decidedly pioneering field of research at that time.

She moved to Rome in 1971 to the Istituto Centrale del Restauro (ICR) and in 1974 was made director of the Museo dell'Alto Medioevo, where she extended the museum's publications along this innovative new line of interest, publications which included the Corpus della Scultura Altomedievale and I Longobardi in Italia, which remain valid reference works today. Further, she introduced the discipline of the High Medieval Era amongst university disciplines which led to it being taught more widely.

From 1976 to 1979 Vaccaro was elected to the Italian Parliament as a backbench Partito Comunista Italiano MP. Upon leaving parliament she was appointed Sopraintendente Aggiunto and Archeologico at the Minstero dei Beni Culturali e Ambiental (MBCA) as well as becoming director of the Servizio Beni Archeologico at ICR, where her broad scientific interests allowed her to take on many themes put in place innovative and competent restoration projects These included directing research into and restoration of the principal marble monuments in Italy dating from the classical era of Rome :

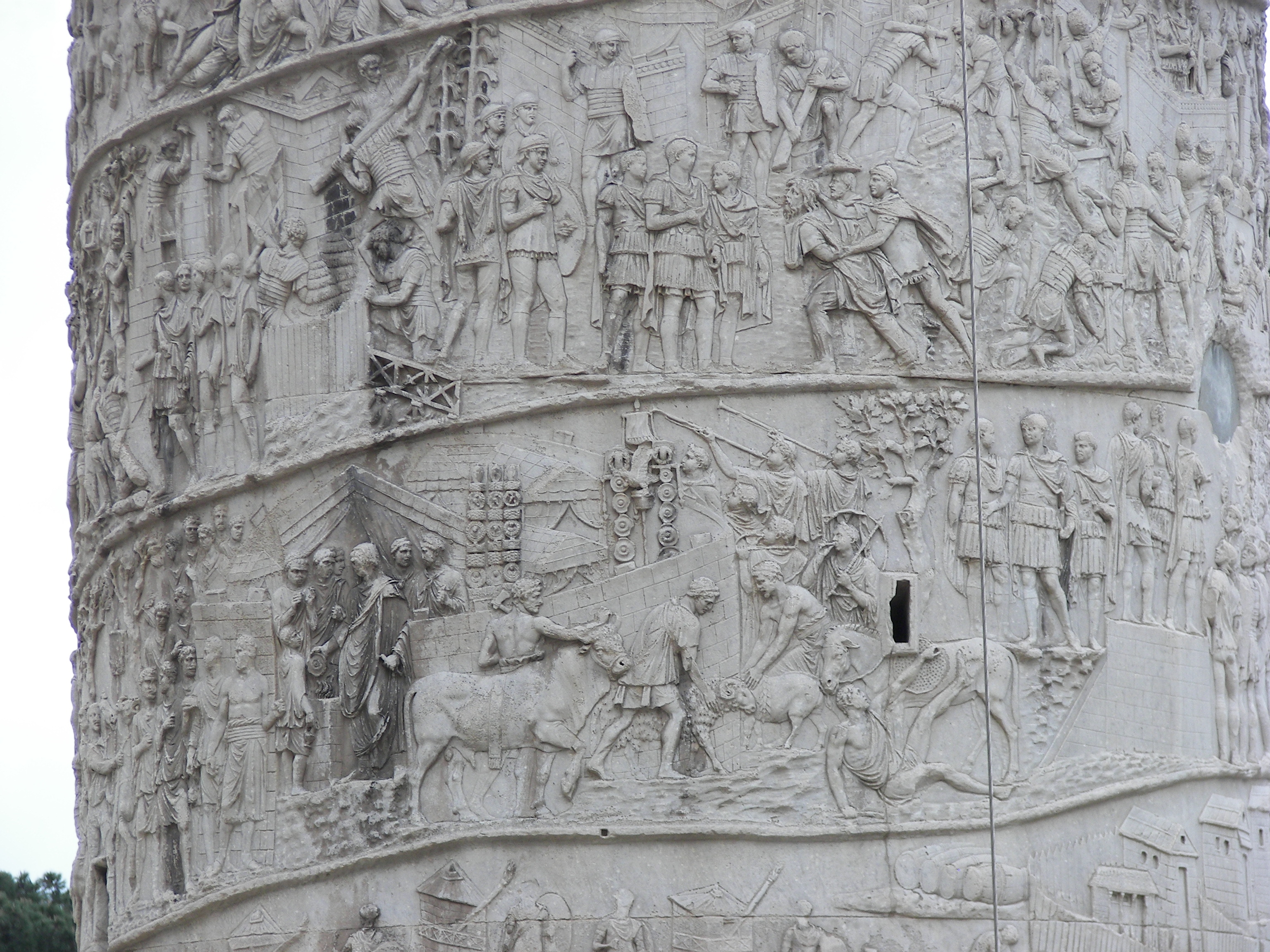
Trajan's Column reliefs

- Trajan's Column
- Column of Antoninus Pius
- Arch of Constantine
- Arch of Septimus Severus
- Temple of Hadrian
- Temple of Saturn
- Temple of Vespasian and Titus
- the Tombs of Tuffatore at Paestum
- the paleochristian underground remains of S. Salvatore of Cabras in Sardinia
- the bronze statue of Marcus Aurelius at Rome
- the Bronzes of Riace in Reggio Calabria

During the fifteen years she spent at ICR, the innovations she brought to archaeological work were published widely, including works on the conservation of stone, architectural patinas and polychromy of ancient monuments. Her work on restoration and 'maintenance programmes' formed the basis for the 'Carta del Rischio del Patrimonio Culturale Italiano'. At this time Vaccaro also contributed to setting up and teaching numerous new courses integrating archaeology and restoration at several universities in Italy.

In 1994 she was in charge of the technical service dealing with international relations and great risks to the environment and landscape at the Minstero dei Beni ed Attivita Culturale, and instigated research into natural and anthropogenic risks to the environment and landscape particularly in respect of archaeological zones such as Pompeii. Vaccaro also represented Italy in international groups such as the National Work Group for the UNESCO World Heritage List and the Bureau du Conseil de la Cooperation Culturelle of the Council of Europe, amongst her many other national and international roles

== Bibliography ==
- Mostra dei materiali della Tuscia Longobarda nelle raccolte pubbliche toscane, Florence 1971
- Corpus della scultura altomedievale VII. La Diocesi di Roma. Tomo III La II regione ecclesiastica, Spoleto 1974
- Il Museo dell’Alto Medioevo, Rome 1975
- I Longobardi in Italia. Materiali e problemi, Milan 1982
- Archeologia e restauro, Milan 1989
- Arezzo. Il colle del Pionta. Il contributo archeologico alla storia del primitivo gruppo cattedrale, Arezzo 1991
- A. Melucco Vaccaro, L. Paroli, Corpus della scultura altomedievale VII. La Diocesi di Roma. Tomo VI Il Museo dell’Alto Medioevo, Spoleto 1995
- N. Stanley Price, M. Kirby Talley Jr., A. Melucco Vaccaro, Historical and Philosophical Issues in the Conservation of Cultural Heritage, Los Angeles 1996
- E. Acquaro, M. T. Francisi, T. K. Kirova, A. Melucco Vaccaro, Tharros nomen, La Spezia 1999
- Archeologia e restauro, II ed. riv., Rome 1999 (2000)
