= Priscilla Reining =

American applied anthropologist (1923–2007)

Priscilla Alden Copeland Reining (March 11, 1923 – July 19, 2007) was an American applied anthropologist. She was most remembered for her extensive work with the HIV/AIDS epidemic, especially throughout Africa. Priscilla Reining was the recipient of three anthropological degrees, from the University of Chicago. Reining's field of specialization was centered mainly in sub-Saharan Africa. During a Sudanese uprising in 1955, Reining and her family fled the country having "led a whole convoy of people." She worked for several years with the Haya people located in Tanzania in the early 1950s becoming one of the uppermost authorities on the village life of sub-Saharan peoples. One of her more notable studies was that of the Haya land tenure:

We have examined the two forms of landholding and tenancy in the Haya system of land tenure. Although they co-exist, they have different bases, the one as an aspect of the traditional structure and the other as an aspect of the structure developing at the time of the study. The significance of each derives from the particular characteristics of Haya land which is valuable but limited in quantity. In the traditional structure, the land formed the base or medium through which the institution of clientship was expressed and some land is still held under this form of tenure. In the developing structure, the pressure on the land makes for heterogeneous arrangements, here considered under the rubric of the relatively new form of tenure.

Reining also pioneered and implicated the Landsat imagery technology in the field of anthropology and other social sciences. However, it was her work on HIV transmission in Africa that brought her most recognition within the anthropology community.

== HIV/AIDS in Africa and Asia ==
During the 1980s while on a visit to Tanzania, Reining noted that the people she had been studying, the Haya, were getting sick and the mortality rate within the region was becoming alarmingly high.

She began to research into causes and prevention methods of the disease. She found an apparent connection between Circumcision and HIV transmission, as uncircumcised men in Kenya had a much higher risk of being infected. She later found cultural fluctuations in different groups who did not practice circumcision, as compared to the neighboring groups who ritually practiced the act of male circumcision. What she found was there was a "correlation between lack of circumcision among some ethnic groups in Africa and increased susceptibility to HIV/AIDS." As a result of her extensive research into peoples of the region and Reining's years of immersion in the cultures of surrounding groups she was able to make the connection that the rate of HIV/AIDS was higher in groups that had a cultural aversion to male circumcision. Her work was never officially validated until shortly before she died, although more than 60 studies over the years supported her findings.

In the mid-1990s, John and Pat Caldwell, mapping the progress of the AIDS epidemic in Africa, confirmed that the regions with the highest HIV/AIDS rates were also regions with the greatest number of uncircumcised males. A similar correlation was found in South Asia and Southeast Asia by a United Nations study (UNAIDS).

== Use of Landsat technology ==
Reining is also responsible for pioneering the use of satellite imagery for social science research, demonstrating in 1973 that Landsat imagery could be combined with field data on villages to produce population and carrying capacity estimates for the Sahel (the arid belt between the Sahara and tropical Africa).

While the introduction of Landsat imagery to the field of social science was slow at first due to the fear of satellites replacing researchers in the field, the technology was eventually widely adopted and incorporated into the fields of anthropology and archaeology among other social sciences. This method is still used today, for studying village patterns as well as making the finding and mapping locations of archaeological sites easier. Reining used this technique to help map the HIV/AIDS occurrences in the region where she worked and it was one of the aspects that contributed to her findings involving male circumcision.

== Other works ==
Reining authored or co-authored over fifty publications.

== Death ==
Reining died in her home on July 19, 2007, aged 84, from complications due to lung cancer.
