= Mercedes Fernández-Martorell =

Spanish writer and anthropologist

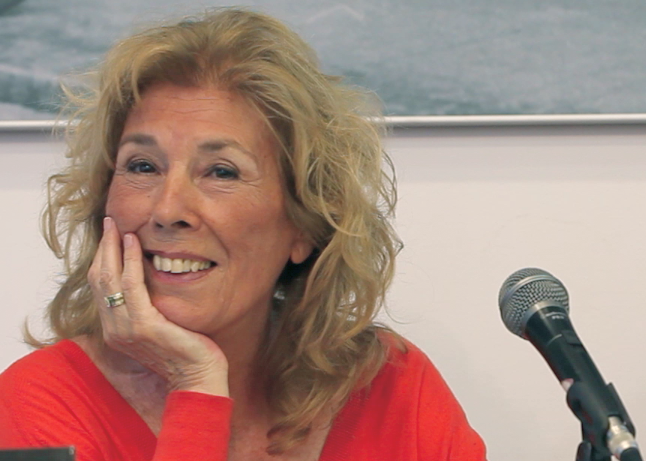
Mercedes Fernández-Martorell

Mercedes Fernández-Martorell (born Barcelona, 25 November 1948) is a Spanish writer and anthropologist.

Fernández-Martorell received a degree in modern history and a Ph.D. in social anthropology from the University of Barcelona. Since 1980, she has been a professor of anthropology at the University of Barcelona. She teaches courses on urban anthropology, as well as Anthropology and Feminism. On both issues, she has published several works. She has given lectures and courses in Spain at the University of Information Sciences in Seville, University of Law in the Basque Country, Bar of Granada, University of Granada, University of Málaga, University of History of Huelva, University of the Balearic Islands, and other centers; in France, at the Graduate School of Social Sciences at the Sorbonne, Paris; in Mexico, at the Pedagogical University of UNAM in Mexico City, and in Italy, at the Centro Internazionale di Etnohistoria in Genoa. Fernández-Martorell directs the Observatory for Construction and Meaning of Human Recreation OCRSH at the University of Barcelona.

== Selected works ==
- Estudio antropológico: Una Comunidad Judía (Barcelona, Mitre, 1984).
- Sobre el concepto de Cultura (Barcelona, Mitre, 1984).
- Leer la Ciudad (dir) (Barcelona, Icaria, 1988).
- Invención del género y vida en sociedad (Madrid, Vol. I UAM, 1988).
- Sexo y Edad: Instrumentos para la vida en común (Madrid, Vol I UAM, 1989).
- Creadores y vividores de ciudades. Ensayo de Antropología Urbana (Barcelona, Editorial EUB, 1996).
- Caminar con leyes para comer (Barcelona, Proa, 1996).
- Los otros vascos. Las migraciones vascas en el siglo XX. Prólogo (Madrid, Fundamentos, 1997)
- Antropología de la Convivencia (Madrid, Cátedra, col. Teorema, 1997)
- Crear seres humanos (México, UNAM, 2002)
- La Semejanza del mundo (Madrid, Cátedra, col. Teorema, 2008)
- Complejidad humana (México, Sb, 2008)
- Ideas que matan (Barcelona, Alfabia, 2012)
- Capitalismo y cuerpo. Crítica de la razón masculina (Madrid, Cátedra, 2018)

=== Other ===
- 60 Conceptos clave de la Antropología Cultural. Matriarcado; Medio; Tribu. (Barcelona, Daimon, 1982)
- Y Zeus engendró a Palas Atenea in: Ethnica, 19, 1983, Barcelona.
- Tiempo de Abel: la muerte judía in: Comentaris, 6, 1984, Barcelona.
- Muerte en dos tiempos: Católicos y judíos in: Antropologiaren III Batzarrea, Donostia, 1984.
- Subdivisión sexuada del grupo humano (Sevilla: ER, 1985)
- Sobre la identidad: la subdivisión (Barcelona, Fundación Caixa de Pensions, 1988)
- Créer des être humains (París, Gradhiva, 1997)
- La experiencia como invento (México D.F., Actas IV Seminario Internacional de Pedagogía, 2001)
- Construcción de la identidad humana (Bilbao, Actas Congreso de Multiculturalismo y extrangerías, 2005)
- El lado oscuro del vencedor (Barcelona, HAFO, vol. 113, 2005)

== Filmography ==
- Les Dones del 36, 1997
- Ando Pensando, 2004
- ¿No queríais saber por qué las matan? POR NADA, 2009

== External pages ==
- Official website
- antropologia urbana.com
