= Sarah F. Maclaren =

Anglo-Italian cultural theorist, sociologist and anthropologist

Sarah F. Maclaren (born June 4, 1964, London, UK) is an Anglo-Italian cultural theorist, sociologist and anthropologist. She is also an expert of Cultural Studies, History of ideas, Aesthetics, Rhetoric, and a cultural and academic organizer.

== Biography ==
Sarah Maclaren was born in London, United Kingdom, and moved to Rome, Italy, where she lives and works. She attended the Liceo ginnasio statale Augusto (Classical high school), where she studied humanities, Latin and ancient Greek. Then she earned her degree in Social and Cultural Anthropology at the University of Rome “La Sapienza” in 1988. After she went to the University of Rome “Tor Vergata” where she gained her Ph.D. in philosophy. Since 1999, Sarah Maclaren has been at the Loyola University of Chicago Rome Center, where she teaches Sociology focusing on the topics “Italy Today” and “Italian Fashion and Design”. She is associate editor of Ágalma. Rivista di studi culturali e di estetica, a scholarly journal on Cultural Studies and Aesthetics, founded by the Italian philosopher Mario Perniola in 2000. She has published books and articles on the history of ideas and cultural studies. In 2004 she went to Kyoto, Japan, to carry out research on the aesthetic thought of the architect Arata Isozaki. Sarah Maclaren lectured in many countries, such as the US, Canada, Australia, Japan, Brazil, Italy and Europe. She is member of the IAPL (The International Association for Philosophy and Literature) founded and directed by Hugh J. Silverman.

== Magnificence (history of ideas) ==
Sarah Maclaren's work focused on magnificence (history of ideas). In the volume Magnificenza e mondo classico (Magnificence and the Classical World 2003), the author sketches the history of the notion deeply rooted in Western culture since classical antiquity. Known in ancient Greek as “megaloprépeia” and in Latin as “magnificentia”, the noun conveys the meaning of doing something great which is fitting or seemly to the circumstance. Although it was often confused with similar concepts such as magnanimity and sublime, magnificence, Maclaren argues, has always had to with the greatness of actions, courage, excellence, honour, generosity, and splendour of lifestyles of noble purposes. The author outlines how, from Plato, Herodotus, Xenophon, Aristotle through Cicero, Demetrius and Vitruvius, magnificence was always an interdisciplinary cultural idea connected to Philosophy, Economics, Sociology, Anthropology, Art Criticism, Rhetoric, Architecture and Art. Such an attitude towards greatness, however, may not necessarily lead towards noble actions. Alcibiades is one of the most notorious examples of how human excellence can turn towards evil deeds, if it is unable to resist political and social ambition, corruption, and greed (Maclaren 2003: 11–24). Given the double role of magnificence – positive and negative – the Italian philosopher Mario Perniola in his volume Strategie del bello. Quarant’anni di estetica italiana (1968–2008) (Strategies of Beauty. Forty years of Italian Aesthetics (1968–2008) (2009) placed magnificence in the category of the tragic which belongs to one of the six trends of contemporary Italian Aesthetics. Maclaren also maintains that magnificence should not be confused with luxury which enjoyed an entirely different intellectual history in western civilization. In the book La magnificenza e il suo doppio. Il pensiero estetico di Giovanni Battista Piranesi (Magnificence and its Double. The Aesthetic thought of Giovanni Battista Piranesi 2005), the author offers a philosophic and aesthetic interpretation of the renowned Italian artist. The first part of the volume addresses the history of the idea of magnificence from the Middle Ages – of which Thomas Aquinas left one of the most insightful theories – through the numerous interpretations it underwent during Italian Humanism and the Renaissance. Then Maclaren shows how Giovanni Battista Piranesi took up this concept at a time when others ideas, such as luxury and the sublime – closer to the cultural context of the Enlightenment and the bourgeoisie – were gaining more attention (Maclaren 2005: 30–45). Piranesi's interpretation had a prominent role within the Greco-Roman debate in which he defended the geniality and originality of Roman architecture, as opposed to the Greek one. In his erudite treatise Della Magnificenza ed Architettura de’ Romani (Concerning Roman Magnificence and Architecture 1761), Piranesi draws on the classical theories of the notion and gives it renewed vigor turning it into a democratic virtue shared by entire ancient Roman population. Maclaren also argues that Piranesi offered a controversial theorization of magnificence which is underground, invisible, uncanny and overwhelming. It is the magnificence of the cloacae – the Roman sewage system – and the Carceri (The Prisons) (Maclaren 2005: 38–45). Thus the author maintains that there is an affinity between the architectural designs of Baroque palaces and the Prisons. The concept acquires a double meaning: a politically correct one – which draws on the classical tradition –, and a politically incorrect one, connected to the uncanny and controversial aspects of the cloacae. Magnificence therefore becomes the key to understanding Piranesi's entire work be it artistic of theoretical (Mario Perniola 2009: 95). From this perspective Piranesi addresses the two inclinations of magnificence (good and evil) already identified by Plato. It is interesting however, to see that Piranesi's alternative interpretation had an extensive influence on the European and American imagination. There is an endless list of poets, artists and others that go from the early Romantics such as William Beckford, Samuel Taylor Coleridge, Thomas De Quincey, through a succession of French and American authors from Honoré de Balzac, Victor Hugo, Charles Baudelaire, Marguerite Yourcenar, Edgar Allan Poe and Herman Melville. The disturbing influences of the Prisons also caught the imagination of Aldous Huxley, Fritz Lang, Yo-Yo Ma and, last but not least, the “outsider artist” Achilles Rizzoli.

== Japan ==
Sarah Maclaren also dealt with aesthetics features of contemporary Japanese architecture during the research she carried out in Kyoto. In particular she focused on Arata Isozaki, renowned for being one of the world's leading architects and architectural thinker. In the final part of the volume La magnificenza e il suo doppio. Il pensiero estetico di Giovanni Battista Piranesi (Magnificence and its Double. The Aesthetic Thought of Giovanni Battista Piranesi 2005), Maclaren shows how Piranesi was often a source of inspiration for Isozaki's designs drawing on the most controversial and avantgarde features of the Italian artist (Maclaren 2005: 145–151). In the work Arata Isozaki e la fine dell’utopia (Arata Isozaki and the End of Utopia 2007), Maclaren addresses the revolutionary, iconoclastic, provocative and anti-modernist traits which have characterized Isozaki's buildings and theories. This approach earned him a highly original profile on the global scene, allowing him to be one of the few architects who brought together both the Far Eastern and Western traditions of aesthetic and architectural designing. Furthermore, Maclaren (2005) argues that contemporary Japanese architecture has drawn on some features of magnificence theorized by Piranesi. The infrastructural facilities, the artificial islands, the global cities demonstrate how Japan is committed towards building public works beneficial on the entire population. On the other hand, the chika, - the Japanese underground cities – remind us of the uncanny and controversial version of magnificence connected to the Piranesian scenes of the Prisons and the Roman cloacae (Maclaren 2005: 151).

== Studio crafts ==
Sarah Maclaren also addressed studio craft. In the work Che cosa sono gli Studio Crafts? (What are Studio Crafts? 2007), the author focuses on the main features of this artistic field, namely what makes it different from art and design, why studio craftspersons insist upon their technical virtuosity and their apprenticeship, and how the artworks are accepted, appreciated, collected, and consumed. Maclaren also analyzes the Italian context in which this type of artistic and aesthetic culture has not been adequately taken into due consideration. In the article Studio Craft. Una produzione tra arte e artigianato (Studio Craft. A production between art and craft 2007), she outlines the historical reconstruction as well as an insightful analysis of the production of the Japanese Onta pottery. Until the 1930s, this type of pottery was produced by the rural community of Sarayama – located in Southern Japan – for its own needs. Maclaren shows how this type of traditional pottery could have disappeared completely, if an efficient process of evaluation had not taken place enabling it to rise to public fame, to be collected and displayed in museums. Sarah Maclaren also analyzes the pivotal role of Yanagi Sōetsu, who, drawing of the British Arts and Crafts movement, devoted himself to set up a cultural field which would safeguard traditional folk crafts on the verge of disappearing due to the rapid industrialization and modernization of Japan. Yanagi founded the Japanese Mingei movement and propagated his ideas through the creation of journals, books, museums, exhibitions as well as awards for the outstanding crafts and craftspersons. It was during one of his journeys around Japan that he came across Onta pottery and admired it because it met his aesthetic ideals.

== Brazil ==
Sarah Maclaren is also involved in the study of Brazilian anthropology and aesthetics. She carried out fieldwork on a small traditional community located in the northeastern state of Pernambuco, thanks to the support of the Instituto Arqueológico Histórico e Geográfico Pernambucano, a Brazilian cultural institution of which she is a member.

== Selected works ==
- “Lusso, spreco, magnificenza”, in “Il lusso oscuro oggetto del desiderio”, Ágalma. Rivista di studi culturali e di estetica, 2, 2002: 43–62. ISBN 978-88-8353-133-0. http://www.agalmaweb.org/sommario.php?rivistaID=2
- “Magnificenza e mondo classico”, Ágalma. Rivista di studi culturali e di estetica, 5, 2003. Monographic issue . ISBN 978-88-8353-241-2. http://www.agalmaweb.org/sommario.php?rivistaID=5
- La magnificenza e il suo doppio. Il pensiero estetico di Giovanni Battista Piranesi, Milano, Mimesis, 2005. ISBN 978-88-8483-248-1.
- “Piranesi y la magnificencia de las aguas de Roma”, “Los sentidos del agua”, Revista de Occidente, 306, 2006: 261–79. ISSN 0034-8635.
- “L’architettura magnifica di Achilles G. Rizzoli”, in “Outsider culture”, Ágalma. Rivista di studi culturali e di estetica, 14, 2007: 42–57. ISBN 978-88-8353-599-4. http://www.agalmaweb.org/sommario.php?rivistaID=14
- “Studio Craft. Una produzione tra arte e artigianato”, in, Alberto Caoci, Franco Lai, eds., Gli “oggetti culturali”. L’artigianato tra estetica, antropologia e sviluppo locale, Milano, Franco Angeli, 2007: 93–106. ISBN 978-88-464-8385-0.
- “Che cosa sono gli Studio Crafts?”, in “Mano, maniera, manierismo”, Ágalma. Rivista di studi culturali e di estetica, 13, 2007: 48–56. ISBN 978-88-8353-560-4 ISSN 1723-0284. http://www.agalmaweb.org/sommario.php?rivistaID=13
- “Arata Isozaki e la fine dell’utopia”, in “Il senso della fine”, Ágalma. Rivista di studi culturali e di estetica, 19, 2009: 61–75. ISSN 1723-0284.
