= Zeineb Benzina =

Tunisian historian, epigraphist and archaeologist

Zeïneb Benzina Ben Abdallah (Arabic: زينب بنزينة بن عبد الله) is an epigrapher and archaeologist, who was, in 2011, Director of Research at the National Heritage Institute (French: L'Institut national du patrimoine) based in Tunis. An expert on ancient Tunisia and North Africa, a festschrift, dedicated to her work was published in 2024, entitled: Fragments d'histoire et d'épigraphie ronaines, Hommages offerts à Zeineb Benzina Ben Abdallah.

== Career ==
Benzina was, in 2011, Director of Research at the National Heritage Institute based in Tunis. She is an expert on ancient Tunisia and North Africa, and in particular Roman Africa, Carthage. Her work with Jean Payras on inscriptions in pre-consulate North Africa was described by R M Kerr as "enlightening". Her catalogue of Latin inscriptions held in the Bardo National Museum was reviewed by Louis Maurin, who described it as erudite, with the commentary writing is a concise yet lively style. On her work on the inscriptions at Haïdra, written with François Baratte and Fathi Bejaoui, their extensive work was described as "an imposing volume". A festschrift, dedicated to her work and edited by Samir Aounallah and L. Naddari, was published in 2024; it was entitled: Fragments d'histoire et d'épigraphie ronaines, Hommages offerts à Zeineb Benzina Ben Abdallah.

== Personal life ==
Benzina's mother was Tewhida Ben Sheikh, the first female physician in the Arab world.
