= Aleksandra Dunin-Wąsowicz =

Polish archaeologist

- Born: 10 June 1932; Poland
- Died: 22 July 2015 (aged 83)
- Occupation: Polish archaeologist

Aleksandra Dunin-Wąsowicz (10 June 1932 – 22 July 2015) was a Polish archaeologist

at the Institute of Archaeology and Ethnology of the Polish Academy of Sciences. She has published studies, primarily in French, of the development of technology in Ancient Greece, and edited archeological maps of the area.

== Published works ==
- 1965 - Wasowicz, Aleksandra. Tokarstwo i bednarstwo w starozytnej Grecji (Tournage et tonnellerie en Grèce antique), Kwartalnik Historii Kultury Materialnej 13, pp. 455–467.
- 1966 - Wasowicz, Aleksandra. Remarques sur la chronologie des principales techniques du traitement du bois dans la Grčce antique, Kwartalnik Historii Kultury Materialnej 16, pp. 739–743.
- 1967 - Wasowicz, Aleksandra. Plan miasta i plan zaplecza rolniczego kolonii greckiej (Znaczenie nowych zródel archeologicznych); (Plan de la ville et du territoire agricole d'une colonie grecque. Importance des nouvelles sources archéologiques), Kwartalnik Historii Kultury Materialnej 15, pp. 743–755.
- 1975 Wasowicz, Aleksandra. Olbia Pontique et son territoire : l'aménagement de l'espace Paris: Belles-lettres, 1975. OCLC 3035787.
- Musée du Louvre, Paule Pinelli, and Aleksandra Wąsowicz. Catalogue des bois et stucs grecs et romains provenant de Kertch. Paris: Ministère de la culture et de la communications, Editions de la Réunion des musées nationaux, 1986. ISBN 978-2-7118-2061-0
- 1979 - Wasowicz, Aleksandra. Les serviteurs sur les monuments funéraires du Pont-Euxin. Éléments pour une enquête.
- 1999 - Ackinazi I., Scholl T., Wasowicz Aleksandra, and Zinko V. N. Archaeological Map of Nymphaion (Crimea), Polish Academy of Sciences, 1999. ISBN 978-83-85463-82-5
