= Lee Ann Newsom =

American anthropologist

- Education: University of Florida
- Awards: MacArthur Fellowship
- Scientific career
- Fields: Anthropologist
- Workplaces: Pennsylvania State University

Lee Ann Newsom is an accomplished archaeologist, paleoethnobotanist, and wood anatomist who has retired after serving many years as an associate professor of anthropology at the Pennsylvania State University at University Park, and also as a professor at Flagler College in St. Augustine, Florida. She has written numerous books and articles. She was awarded a MacArthur Fellowship in 2002.

== Education ==
Newsom received all of her degrees in anthropology, all from the University of Florida.

- Bachelor's degree, 1982
- Master's degree, 1986
- Doctor of Philosophy, 1993

== Career ==
Newsom's investigations into ancient plant remains, have uncovered new methods for identifying and cataloguing early plant and wood species, as well as an important database of information for future research. Her work expands the range of prehistoric Caribbean archaeology; it is valuable to environmentalists, historians, and others outside the field of archaeology. In 2002, in honor of her groundbreaking research, in ancient plant remains, Newsom received a prestigious MacArthur Foundation fellowship, which provides a $500,000 stipend. She stated in Archaeology "I'd like to use part of the money for comparative DNA analysis of botanical remains in the U.S. and Mexico." While in the Daily Collegian it was stated that "Newsom said she will invest some of the money into laboratories and new microscopes for her students. She also said the money will help her to start new projects that she could not previously get funding for." In 2018, Newsom's work had identified the earliest corn yet found in the Caribbean (dating to between AD1200- and AD 1300). Newsom has also made many contributions to maritime archaeology, primarily through the analysis and identification of the wood species of timbers from a wide variety of historic shipwrecks, lending insight into historical timber sourcing, milling, and ship construction.

== Books ==
- On Land and Sea (2004)
- Case Studies in Environmental Archaeology (Interdisciplinary Contributions to Archaeology) (1996)
- Wood in Archaeology Cambridge Manuals in Archaeology. Cambridge University Press (2022)

== Selected Publications (1990 & forward) ==
- 1990a G. Doran, D. Dickell, and L. Newsom. A 7,290-year-old bottle gourd from the Windover Site, Florida. American Antiquity55(2):354-360.
- 1993a -and S.D. Webb, and J.S. Dunbar. History and geographic distribution of Cucurbita pepo gourds in Florida. Journal of Ethnobiology 13(1):75-97.
- 1993b Plants and people: cultural, biological, and ecological responses to wood exploitation. pp. 115–137 in Foraging and Farming in the Eastern Woodlands (C.M. Scarry, ed.), University Presses of Florida, Gainesville.
- 1994a -and K.A. Deagan. Zea mays in the West Indies: the archaeological and early historic record. pp. 203–217 in Corn and Culture in the Prehistoric New World (C.A. Hastorf and S. Johannessen, eds.). Westview Press, Boulder, Co.
- 1994b N. Tuross, M.L. Fogel, L. Newsom, and G.H. Doran. Subsistence in the Florida Archaic: the stable isotope and archaeobotanical evidence from the Windover Site. American Antiquity 59(2):288-303.
- 1998 Mangroves and Root Crops: Archaeobotanical Record from En Bas Saline, Haiti. pp. 52–66 in Proceedings of the 16th International Congress for Caribbean Archaeology (G. Richard, ed.). Conseil Regional de la Guadeloupe, Basse Terre.
- 1999 –and J. Molengraaff. Paleoethnobotanical analysis of Ceramic Age deposits from Hope Estate, St. Martin. pp. 229–247 in The Archaeology of Hope Estate, St. Martin/St. Maarten (C. Hofman and M. Hoogland, eds.). Institute for Prehistory, Leiden University, Leiden, The Netherlands.
- 2000 F.J. Rich, A. Semratedu, J. Elzea, and L. Newsom. Palynology and paleoecology of a wood-bearing clay deposit from Deepstep, Georgia. Southeastern Geology 39 (2):71-80.
- 2001 Zayac, T., F.J. Rich, and L. Newsom. The paleoecology and depositional environments of the McClelland Sandpit Site, Douglas, Georgia. Southeastern Geology 40(4):1-14.
- 2002a Concerning North America (invited editorial). Antiquity 76(292):287-310.
- 2002b S.R. Teixeira, J. B. Dixon, G. N. White, and L.A. Newsom. Charcoal in soils: a preliminary view. pp. 819–830 in Environmental Soil Mineralogy (J.B. Dixon, ed.). Soil Science Society of America, Inc., Madison, Wisconsin.
- 2002c The paleoethnobotany of the Archaic mortuary pond. pp. 191–210 in Windover: Multidisciplinary Investigations of an Early Archaic Florida Cemetery (G. Doran, ed.). University Presses of Florida, Gainesville.
- 2003 -and D. Pearsall. Temporal and spatial trends indicated by a survey of Archaic- and Ceramic-Age archaeobotanical data from the Caribbean islands. pp. 347–412 in People and Plants in Ancient Eastern North America (P. Minnis, ed.). Smithsonian Institution Press, Washington, D.C.
- 2004a Baas, P., N. Blokhina, T. Fujii, P. Gasson, D. Grosser, I. Heinz, J. Ilic, J. Xiaomei, R. Miller, L.A. Newsom, S. Noshiro, H.G. Richter, M. Suzuki, T. Terrazas, E. Wheeler, A. Wiedenhoeft. IAWA List of Microscopic Features for Softwood Identification, edited by H.G. Richter, D. Grosser, I. Heinz, and P.E. Gasson. IAWA Journal 25(1):1-70.
- 2004b Törnqvist, T.E., J.L. González, L.A. Newsom, K. Van der Borg, A.F.M. De Jong, and C. Kurnik. Reconciling Holocene Sea-level History on the US Gulf Coast: Is the Mississippi Delta the Rosetta Stone? Geological Society of America Bulletin 116(7/8):1026-1039.
- 2005 S. DeFrance, and L.A. Newsom. The status of paleoethnobiological research on Puerto Rico and adjacent islands. pp. 122–184 in Ancient Borinquen: Archaeology and Ethnohistory of Native Puerto Rico (P. E. Siegel, ed.). University of Alabama Press, Tuscaloosa.
- 2006a L.A. Curet, L.A. Newsom, and S. deFrance. Prehispanic social and cultural changes at Tibes, Puerto Rico. Journal of Field Archaeology 31(1):23-39.
- 2006b Caribbean maize. pp. 325–335 in Histories of Maize: Multidisciplinary Approaches to the Prehistory, Biogeography, Domestication, and Evolution of Maize ( J. Staller, R. Tykot, and B. Benz, eds.). Elsevier, San Diego, CA.
- 2006c -and M.H. Mihlbachler. Mastodon (Mammut americanum) diet and foraging patterns based on paleofecal material from Page/Ladson (8JE581), Jefferson County, Florida. pp. 263–331 in First Floridians and Last Mastodons: The Page-Ladson Site on the Aucilla River (S.D. Webb ed.). Plenum Press, New York.
- 2006d The paleoecological implications of macrophytic data from the Page-Ladson site. pp. 181–211 in First Floridians and Last Mastodons: The Page-Ladson Site on the Aucilla River (S.D. Webb., ed.). Plenum Press, New York.
- 2006e – and D.H. Trieu. Introduction and Adoption of Crops from Europe. pp. 471–484 in The Handbook of North American Indians, Volume 3 (D.H. Ubelaker and B.D. Smith, eds.). Smithsonian Institution, Washington, D.C.
- 2006f Tubers, Fruits, and Fuel: Paleoethnobotanical Investigations of the Dynamics between Culture and the Forested Environment on Nevis, Lesser Antilles. pp. 103–144 in The Prehistory of Nevis: a Small Island in the Lesser Antilles, Samuel M. Wilson (ed.). Peabody Museum of Natural History Publications, Yale University Press, New Haven.
- 2007 Reitz, E.J., L.A. Newsom, S.J. Scudder, and C.M. Scarry, Introduction to Environmental Archaeology. pp. 3–19 in Case Studies in Environmental Archaeology, Second Edition (E. J. Reitz, C.M. Scarry, and S.J. Scudder (editors). Plenum Press, New York.
- 2008 Caribbean paleoethnobotany: Present Status and New Horizons (Understanding the Evolution of an Indigenous Ethnobotany). pp. 173–194 in Crossing the Borders: New Methods and Techniques in the Study of Material Culture in the Caribbean(C. Hofman, ed.). The University of Alabama Press, Tuscaloosa.
- 2009—and R.B. Miller, Wood Species Analysis of Ship Timbers and Wooden Items Recovered from Shipwreck 31CR314, Queen Anne’s Revenge Site. Research Report and Bulletin Series QAR-R-09-01, the State of North Carolina, Department of Cultural Resources, Office of State Archaeology, Underwater Archaeology Branch. On-line version:http://www.qaronline.org/techSeries/QAR-R-09-01.pdf
- 2010 Tibes Paleoethnobotany. In Tibes: People, Power, and Ritual at the Center of the Cosmos (A. Curet and L. Stringer, eds.). The University of Alabama Press, Tuscaloosa.
- 2011 -- and D.A. Trieu, New crops and fusion gardens: the Columbian Exchange and Native North America Chapter 23 in The Subsistence Economies of Indigenous North American Societies: A Handbook, B. Smith (ed.) Smithsonian Institution, Washington, D.C.
- 2013 -and C.M. Scarry. Homegardens and Mangrove Swamps: Archaeobotanical Research at the Pineland Site Complex, Lee County, Florida. In The Archaeology of Pineland: a Coastal Southwest Florida Village Complex, A.D. 100-1600, K. Walker/W. Marquardt (eds.). Inst. of Archaeology & Paleoenvironmental Studies Monograph 3 (FlaMNH) (submitted 2002; remains in production).
- 2013 -and R. Brown, and W. Natt. From the forests: wood and fiber industries at Pineland, Florida. In The Archaeology of Pineland: a Coastal Southwest Florida Village Complex, A.D. 100–1600, K. Walker and W.H. Marquardt (eds.). Inst. of Archaeology & Paleoenvironmental Studies, Monograph 3 (FlaMNH).
- 2023 Vessel Located on Little Talbot Island: Wood Analysis and Taxonomic Assignments. In Final Report for the First Coast Maritime Archaeology Project (FCMAP) 2020-2022: Hurricane Irma Damage Assessment and Mitigation Strategy (HIrmaDAMS), Chuck Meide, Airielle Cathers, Nicholas C. Budsberg, Dorothy Rowland, Christopher McCarron, Thomas MacAvoy, Leah Tavasi, Lori Lee, Jillyan Corrales, Starr Cox, and Heather Jeans, pp. 571-577. LAMP Research Reports No. 8, Lighthouse Archaeological Maritime Program, St. Augustine Lighthouse & Maritime Museum, St. Augustine, Florida.
- 2023 Schooner Deliverance: Wood Sample Analysis. In Final Report for the First Coast Maritime Archaeology Project (FCMAP) 2020-2022: Hurricane Irma Damage Assessment and Mitigation Strategy (HIrmaDAMS), Chuck Meide, Airielle Cathers, Nicholas C. Budsberg, Dorothy Rowland, Christopher McCarron, Thomas MacAvoy, Leah Tavasi, Lori Lee, Jillyan Corrales, Starr Cox, and Heather Jeans, pp. 578-582. LAMP Research Reports No. 8, Lighthouse Archaeological Maritime Program, St. Augustine Lighthouse & Maritime Museum, St. Augustine, Florida.
- 2023 Centerboard Schooner (8SJ3309): Wood Analysis and Taxonomic Assignments. In Final Report for the First Coast Maritime Archaeology Project (FCMAP) 2020-2022: Hurricane Irma Damage Assessment and Mitigation Strategy (HIrmaDAMS), Chuck Meide, Airielle Cathers, Nicholas C. Budsberg, Dorothy Rowland, Christopher McCarron, Thomas MacAvoy, Leah Tavasi, Lori Lee, Jillyan Corrales, Starr Cox, and Heather Jeans, pp. 583-590. LAMP Research Reports No. 8, Lighthouse Archaeological Maritime Program, St. Augustine Lighthouse & Maritime Museum, St. Augustine, Florida.
- 2023 Steamship (8SJ3310): Wood Analysis and Taxonomic Assignments. In Final Report for the First Coast Maritime Archaeology Project (FCMAP) 2020-2022: Hurricane Irma Damage Assessment and Mitigation Strategy (HIrmaDAMS), Chuck Meide, Airielle Cathers, Nicholas C. Budsberg, Dorothy Rowland, Christopher McCarron, Thomas MacAvoy, Leah Tavasi, Lori Lee, Jillyan Corrales, Starr Cox, and Heather Jeans, pp. 591-595. LAMP Research Reports No. 8, Lighthouse Archaeological Maritime Program, St. Augustine Lighthouse & Maritime Museum, St. Augustine, Florida.
