= Katharina C. Rebay =

Austrian archaeologist and professor

Katharina Rebay-Salisbury
- Education: University of Vienna
- Occupations: Archaeologist, professor
- Employer: University of Vienna
- Known for: Bioarchaeology, gender archaeology, and the study of motherhood in prehistoric Central Europe
- Notable work: Death and the Body in Bronze Age Europe (2023, with M. L. S. Sørensen); The Human Body in Early Iron Age Central Europe (2016)
- Awards: European Research Council Starting Grant (2015)

Katharina Rebay-Salisbury (born 1977) is an Austrian archaeologist and professor of Prehistory of Humanity at the University of Vienna. She specialises in the European Bronze and Iron Ages, combining interdisciplinary bioarchaeology with the study of social identities, particularly sex, gender, motherhood, and kinship in prehistoric Central Europe.

== Career ==
Rebay-Salisbury received her PhD from the University of Vienna in 2005. She subsequently held postdoctoral positions at the University of Cambridge (2005–2008) and the University of Leicester (2009–2014), working on Leverhulme Trust-funded research programmes examining changing beliefs about the human body and craft networks in the ancient world.

She returned to Vienna in 2015 as a postdoctoral researcher at the Austrian Archaeological Institute of the Austrian Academy of Sciences. In the same year, she was awarded a European Research Council Starting Grant for the project "The Value of Mothers to Society," investigating responses to motherhood and child-rearing practices in prehistoric Europe. She completed her Habilitation at the University of Vienna in 2017 and has since directed the research group "Prehistoric Identities" at the Austrian Academy of Sciences.

In February 2023, she was appointed professor of Prehistory of Humanity at the University of Vienna. In 2024, she was elected a Corresponding Member of the Austrian Academy of Sciences.

== Research ==
Rebay-Salisbury's research combines bioarchaeology—including ancient DNA, proteomics, and isotope analysis—with archaeological theory to investigate social identities and relations in prehistoric Central Europe. A central strand of her work concerns the archaeology of motherhood and gendered burial practices. Her team has applied peptide-based sex identification to demonstrate that gendered burial practices in the Early Bronze Age largely align with biological sex.

Her earlier work examined the transition from inhumation to cremation in Late Bronze Age Europe, published as Death and the Body in Bronze Age Europe (2023, with Marie Louise Stig Sørensen), which has been reviewed in Antiquity and The Past. Her study of human representations and burial practices in Iron Age networks, The Human Body in Early Iron Age Central Europe (2016), was reviewed in the European Journal of Archaeology.

== Selected publications ==
- Rebay-Salisbury, K., Berner, M., Wiltschke-Schrotta, K., Herrero Corral, A. M., Wolf, M., & Kanz, F. 2025. More Error than Minority: Gendered Burial Practices Align with Peptide-based Sex Identification in Early Bronze Age Burials in Central Europe. Cambridge Archaeological Journal: 1–16.
- Haselgrove, C., Rebay-Salisbury, K., & Wells, P. S. (eds) 2023. The Oxford Handbook of the European Iron Age. Oxford: Oxford University Press.
- Sørensen, M. L. S., & Rebay-Salisbury, K. 2023. Death and the Body in Bronze Age Europe: From Inhumation to Cremation. Cambridge: Cambridge University Press.
- Rebay-Salisbury, K., Bortel, P., Janker, L., Bas, M., Pany-Kucera, D., Salisbury, R. B., Gerner, C., & Kanz, F. 2022. Gendered burial practices of early Bronze Age children align with peptide-based sex identification. Journal of Archaeological Science 139: 105549.
- Rebay-Salisbury, K., Dunne, J., Salisbury, R. B., Kern, D., Frisch, A., & Evershed, R. P. 2021. Feeding Babies at the Beginnings of Urbanization in Central Europe. Childhood in the Past 14(2): 102–124.
- Rebay-Salisbury, K. 2016. The Human Body in Early Iron Age Central Europe: Burial Practices and Images of the Hallstatt World. London: Routledge.
