= Martha Rhoads Bell =

American archaeologist

- Born: Martha Hope Rhoads; April 27, 1941; Philadelphia, Pennsylvania
- Died: November 12, 1991 (aged 50) near Hillside, New Jersey
- Education: Barnard College (BA); University of Pennsylvania (PhD)
- Spouse: Lanny Bell
- Scientific career
- Fields: Archaeology
- Thesis: "The Tutankhamun Burnt Group from Gurob, Egypt: Bases for the Absolute Chronology of LH III A and B." (1991)

Martha Rhoads Bell (April 27, 1941 – November 12, 1991) was an American archaeologist. Her specialty was Mycenaean imported pottery and imitations found in Egypt and Nubia, as well as Egyptian-Mycenaean interconnections in the New Kingdom and their implications for chronology.

== Early life ==
Martha Hope Rhoads was born in Philadelphia, Pennsylvania on April 27, 1941. She was raised in Allentown and Center Valley (both Pennsylvania) by her parents, Dr. Donald Ziegler Rhoads and Elsie Teetsel Rhoads.

== Family ==
On September 22, 1968, she married Lanny Bell, an Oriental Institute Egyptologist.

== Career ==
She attended Cedar Crest College in Allentown (1959–1961) and her B.A. of Arts in Ancient History from Barnard College. While at Cedar Crest College, one of her professors was Burr C. Brundage, who introduced Martha to Egyptology. At Barnard, her mentor was Morton Smith.

She attended graduate school at the University of Pennsylvania from 1963 to 1968. During 1966 and 1967 she worked at the American School of Classical Studies at Athens, visiting many sites in Greece and Crete. Initially, she was drawn to the study of Minoan religion. At the conclusion of 1967, she joined the University of Pennsylvania's excavations at Gordion under Rodney Young.

Her husband Lanny had begun work at the Ramesside tombs of Dra Abu el-Naga on the west bank at Luxor, where she worked as the chief archaeologist for that expedition, participating in all three seasons (1970, '72, and '74).

In 1977, she co-managed the University of Chicago's Epigraphic Survey, based at Chicago House in Luxor, which her husband directed. The Chicago House was a large installation, with extensive professional and facility staff. During the twelve years of the Bells' residency in Luxor, Martha Bell would carry out her own research, visiting numerous sites and museums, and taking part in Barry Kemp's 1982 excavations at the city site of ancient Akhetaten, at Tell el-Amarna.

Pennsylvania's professor of Egyptian archaeology, David O'Connor, had introduced Bell to Robert Merrillees, whose book The Cypriote Bronze Age Pottery found in Egypt inspired her to examine the range of Mycenaean pottery found at ancient Egyptian sites. She collected data on numerous new and unknown Mycenaean objects both in Egypt and in European collections and assembled data for a catalog of Mycenaean pottery in the Cairo Museum. She developed an in-depth understanding of the Late Bronze Age Mycenaean and New Kingdom Egyptian interrelationships.

She was awarded her Ph.D. in classical archaeology at the University of Pennsylvania on May 21, 1991. The title of her dissertation is "The Tutankhamun Burnt Group from Gurob, Egypt: Bases for the Absolute Chronology of LH III A and B." It focuses on a re-dating of the finds at Gurob, a site whose chronology was in a shambles but which Aegeanists had placed much reliance. In 1991, she won a grant from the American Philosophical Society, in order to continue her research.

== Death ==
A few months after receiving her Ph.D., Bell was killed in a car crash on I-78 near Hillside, New Jersey, on November 12, 1991. She was 50 years old.

== Articles ==
- "The Tutankhamun Burnt Group from Gurob, Egypt: Bases for the absolute chronology of LH III A and B". repository.upenn.edu. Archived from the original on March 4, 2016.
- "An Armchair Excavation of KV 55," Journal of the American Research Center in Egypt 27 (1990): 97–137
- "A Hittite Pendant from Amarna," American Journal of Archaeology 90 (1986): 145–51
