= Sohini Ray =

Indian anthropologist

- Born: 25 August 1966 (age 60); Kolkata, India
- Other name: Sona
- Occupations: Choreographer, Anthropologist

Sohini Ray (born 25 August 1966) is a classical Manipuri dancer dance-researcher and anthropologist from India currently based in Los Angeles, United States.

== Early career ==
Ray studied Manipuri dance from age seven in Manipuri Nartanalaya, Kolkata under Guru Bipin Singh, Darshana Jhaveri and Kalavati Devi. She went through her initiation ceremony with Guru Bipin Singh at age eleven and started performing professionally at fourteen. She was also Guru Bipin Singh's research assistant from age fourteen and received the national scholarship in Manipuri dance from the ministry of culture, Government of India in 1982. Concurrently she did her schooling from Modern High School for girls, Kolkata, where she also performed in school functions.

== Academic career ==
Ray did her B.Sc. and M.Sc. degrees in anthropology from University of Calcutta. Later, she received her MA in dance and Ph.D. in anthropology from University California at Los Angeles. (Sanamahism). She was a fellow at the Center for the Study of World Religions, Harvard Divinity School and faculty fellow in University of California, Humanities Research Institute, University of California, Irvine. She has taught in University of California, Irvine, University of California, Santa Barbara and Santa Monica College and has many publications.

== Dance career ==
Sohini Ray is the founder and artistic director of Manipuri Dance Visions – Institute of Manipuri Dance in southern California. She has performed, choreographed and directed many productions in classical Manipuri dance namely Harao-kummei: joyful celebrations in Manipuri dance, Gita-Govinda, Krishna-Ningshingba and has performed and toured Europe and North America and India,

== Academic awards and achievements ==
Jubilee prize, University of Calcutta, India, 1988 National Scholarship, University of Calcutta, India, 1988 University gold medal, University of Calcutta, India, 2011. JB Donne Prize in anthropology of art, Royal Anthropological Institute, 2009.

== Dance awards and achievements ==
- National scholarship from government of India from 1982-1986,
- First prize in Manipuri dance, Sangeetotsav, 1988
- Shringar-Mani award, Kal-ke-kalakaar Sangeet Sammelan, Mumbai, 1988
- Naratan Acharya, Manipuri Nartanalaya, Kolkata, 1999.
- Elaine Weissman Los Angeles Treasures Award, California Traditional Music Society, 2007
- Nomination, Lestor Horton Award, 2007
- Winner, Lestor Horton Award, 2008
- Nomination, Lestor Horton award, 2010.
