= Jennifer Moody =

American archaeologist

Jennifer Alice Moody is an American archaeologist, and research fellow at University of Texas at Austin.

She studies the archaeology, and environmental history of Crete.

== Awards ==
- 1989 MacArthur Fellows Program

== Works ==
- Alan Peatfield, Jennifer Moody, Stavroula Markoulaki (2000) "The Ayios Vasilios Valley Archaeological Survey: a preliminary report", Proceedings of the 8th Cretological Congress Iraklion, Crete, pp. 359–371
- "Survey Methodology", Reports on the Vrokastro Area, Eastern Crete: The settlement history of the Vrokastro area and related studies, UPenn Museum of Archaeology, 2004, ISBN 9781931707596
- Contributions to Aegean archaeology: studies in honor of William A. McDonald, Editors William Andrew McDonald, Nancy C. Wilkie, William D. E. Coulson, Kendall/Hunt Pub. Co., 1985, ISBN 978-0-8403-3526-5
- "Relative sea-level changes in Crete: reassessment of radiocarbon dates from Sphakia and West Crete", Oxford Research Archive "Annual of the British School at Athens" 97 171–200
- Oliver Rackham and Jennifer Moody (1996), The Making of the Cretan Landscape, Manchester University Press, Manchester and New York
