= Pamela Erickson =

Medical anthropologist

Pamela Irene Erickson (born 12 April 1951) is a medical anthropologist. The holder of both a Dr.P.H (Public Health, UCLA 1988) and a PhD (Anthropology, SUNY Buffalo 1993), she is Professor of Anthropology and Community Medicine at the University of Connecticut, Storrs. A former editor of the scholarly journal Medical Anthropology Quarterly, much of her own research has focused on reproductive health among Hispanic girls and young women. Prominent among the publications resulting from these investigations is her 1998 book, Latina Adolescent Childbearing in East Los Angeles. Erickson has also done fieldwork in Nepal, the Philippines, India, and Ecuador and this work is reflected in her 2008 textbook, Ethnomedicine. A Fellow of the American Anthropological Association and the Society for Applied Anthropology, Erickson has also served on the Governing Council of the Family and Reproductive Health Section of the American Public Health Association. Additionally, she is co-editor, with Merrill Singer of the book series Advances in Critical Medical Anthropology with Routledge.

== Selected publications ==
=== Books ===
- Erickson, Pamela I. (1998). Latina Adolescent Childbearing in East Los Angeles. Austin, TX: University of Texas Press.
- Erickson, Pamela I. (2008). Ethnomedicine. Waveland Press.
- Singer, Merrill; Erickson, Pamela I., eds. (2011). A Companion to Medical Anthropology. Wiley-Blackwell.
- Singer, Merrill; Erickson, Pamela I. (2013). Global Health. An Anthropological Perspective. Long Grove, IL: Waveland Press.

=== Articles ===
- Erickson, Pamela I.; Badiane, Louise; Singer, Merrill (2013). "The Social Context and Meaning of Virginity Loss among African American and Puerto Rican Young Adults in Hartford". Medical Anthropology Quarterly. 27 (3): 313–329. doi:10.1111/maq.12047. PMID 24105907.
- Beckerman, S.; Erickson, P. I.; Yost, J.; Regalado, J.; Jaramillo, L.; Sparks, C.; Iromenga, M.; Long, K. (2009). "Life histories, blood revenge, and reproductive success among the Waorani of Ecuador". Proceedings of the National Academy of Sciences of the United States of America. 106 (20): 8134–8139. Bibcode:2009PNAS..106.8134B. doi:10.1073/pnas.0901431106. PMC 2688884. PMID 19433797.
- Singer, Merrill C.; Erickson, Pamela I.; Badiane, Louise; Diaz, Rosemary; Ortiz, Dugeidy; Abraham, Traci; Nicolaysen, Anna Marie (2006). "Syndemics, sex and the city: Understanding sexually transmitted diseases in social and cultural context". Social Science & Medicine. 63 (8): 2010–2021. doi:10.1016/j.socscimed.2006.05.012. PMC 7131051. PMID 16782250.
- Singer, Merrill; Erickson, Pamela (2008). "Nothing to Play Around With: Dangerous Toys for Girls and Boys". In Singer, M.; Baser, H. (eds.). Killer Commodities: Public Health and the Corporate Production of Harm. Altamira Press.
- Erickson, Pamela; Cheney, Ann (2008). "Silicone Seduction: Are Cosmetic Breast Implants?". In Singer, M.; Baser, H. (eds.). Killer Commodities: Public Health and the Corporate Production of Harm. Altamira Press.
