= Carol Delaney =

American anthropologist and author

Carol Lowery Delaney (born December 12, 1940) is an American anthropologist and author. She is also an Associate Professor of Cultural and Social Anthropology, Emerita of Stanford University.

== Education ==
Delaney earned an A.B. in philosophy from Boston University in 1962, an M.T.S. from Harvard Divinity School in 1976, and her Ph.D. in cultural anthropology from the University of Chicago in 1984.

== Academic career ==
Delaney was the assistant director of the Center for the Study of World Religions at Harvard University, and a visiting professor in the Department of Religious Studies at Brown University. She is now a professor emerita at Stanford University and a research scholar at Brown University.

== Anthropological work ==
Delaney specializes in the anthropological sub-discipline of cultural anthropology, focusing on gender and religion. Her original anthropological fieldwork was conducted in Turkey from 1979-1982; from 1984–85, Delaney conducted additional fieldwork in Belgium among Turkish immigrants. More recently, her research has focused on the religious beliefs of Christopher Columbus. In 1995, Delaney co-edited the volume Naturalizing Power: Essays in Feminist Cultural Analysis with Sylvia Yanagisako.

Delaney was Assistant Director of the Center for the Study of World Religions, Harvard University, 1985-87. At Stanford University, she was Assistant Professor of Anthropology, 1987-1995; Associate Professor, 1995-2005; Emerita, 2005. At Brown University, she was visiting professor in Religious Studies, 2006 and 2007. From 2007 to the present, she served as a Research Scholar in that department and is also an Invited Research Scholar at the John Carter Brown Library at Brown University.

Delaney has been criticized for whitewashing the history of and ignoring the known atrocities committed by Christopher Columbus in the Americas in her book Columbus and the Quest for Jerusalem, while also praised for highlighting that Columbus has taken the blame for atrocities committed by all Europeans intentionally and unintentionally to native peoples in the "New World".

She has published many anthropological literature, her most recent including "Investigating Culture: An Experiential Introduction to Anthropology."

== Bibliography ==
- Delaney, Carol (1991), The Seed and The Soil: Gender and Cosmology in Turkish Village Society, Comparative Studies on Muslim Societies, Berkeley: University of California Press, ISBN 978-0-52007-550-4
- Co-editors Delaney, Carol; Yanagisako, Sylvia (1995), Naturalizing Power: Essays in Feminist Cultural Analysis, New York: Routledge Press, ISBN 978-0-41590-884-9
- Delaney, Carol (1998), Abraham on Trial: The Social Legacy of Biblical Myth, Princeton: Princeton University Press, ISBN 978-0-69107-050-6 - Finalist for National Jewish Book Award [category: Scholarship]; also a special mention for Victor Turner Prize of the Society for Humanistic Anthropology and inspiration for an opera of the same title by Andrew Lovett.
- Delaney, Carol (2001), Tohum ve Toprak Turkish translation, of The Seed and the Soil, Istanbul: IletisimYayinlari, 2001. Second printing, 2009.
- Delaney, Carol (2003), Investigating Culture: An Experiential Introduction to Anthropology, Oxford: Blackwell Publishers, 2003 in UK; 2004 in US. Second, revised edition, with Deborah Kaspin, 2011.ISBN 978-1-11886-862-1 2017 in US revised third edition. ISBN 978-1-118-86886-7
- Delaney, Carol (2011),Columbus and the Quest for Jerusalem, New York: Free Press/Simon and Schuster, ISBN 978-1-43910-237-4 - One of “Best Books of 2011,” The Times Literary Supplement. December 2, 2011.

== Selected articles ==
- "Columbus’s Ultimate Goal: Jerusalem."
- “Untangling the Meanings of Hair in Turkish Village Society.”
- "The Hajj: Sacred and Secular."
- "The Meaning of Paternity and the Virgin Birth Debate."

== Fellowships and awards ==
- National Endowment for the Humanities, John Carter Brown Library at Brown University, 2004–05
- Fellow, Center for Advanced Study in the Behavioral Sciences, Stanford University, 1996–97
- Fellow, Harvard Divinity School, 1992–93
- Fellow, Stanford Humanities Center, 1989–90
- Mark Perry Galler prize for the most distinguished dissertation in the social sciences at the University of Chicago, 1985.
- Fulbright Advanced Research Fellowship, 1984–85
- Fulbright-Hays Dissertation Fellowship, 1981–82
- National Science Foundation, Dissertation Grant, 1981–82
- Fulbright Cultural Exchange Scholar, 1979–80
