= Anna Pujol Puigvehi =

Spanish archaeologist and historian

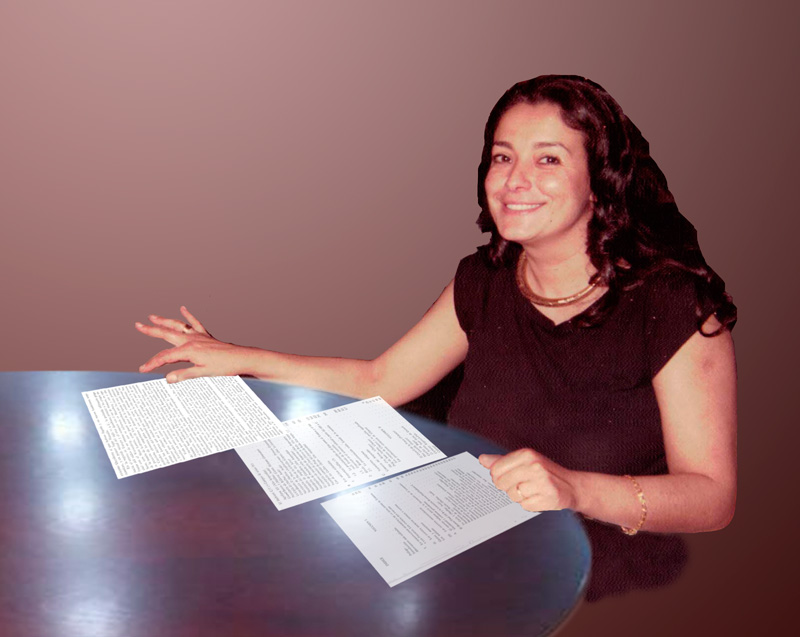
Anna Pujol Puigvehi

Anna Pujol Puigvehí (born in Figueres, Catalonia, Spain, on August 16, 1947). Historian, professor and archaeologist. Bachelor of Arts from the University of Barcelona (1970), with the thesis “The Indiketes as the literary and archaeological sources”, Dr. summa cum laude in History from the Autonomous University of Barcelona with the doctoral thesis on the “Pre-Roman Population of the Northeast of the Iberian Peninsula. Genesis and development of Iberian culture in the Girona and south of France lands” (1981). She has taught at the Autonomous University of Barcelona for over 15 years, and has been Associate professor of Archaeology and Ancient History of the UOC (Open University of Catalonia). She won a Chair of Professor of History of Secondary Schools in 1981.

As an archaeologist she has taught several technical courses in Empuries and with international Franco-Spanish teams has excavated at sites of scientific importance as the oriental palace of Cancho Roano, (Zalamea de la Serena, Badajoz, Spain) or the Gallo-Roman town of Bibracte (Mount-Beuvary, Nièvre, France ), and in numerous sites of different periods and types of Spain, Catalonia (Ullastret, Ampurias ...) and Europe (Saint-Remy-de-Provence, Bourges, Bordighera, Liguria ...). The experience of the teaching of archeology has driven her to organize and to be the speaker of the I and the II Conference on Archaeology and Education at the Museum of Archaeology of Catalonia in 1994 and 1996. She has also worked in the Computer Education Program (PIE) of the Department of Education of the Generalitat of Catalonia, the result of which is the computerized document on The Iberians of Catalonia which is available free on the website of this Department.

She is scientific advisor of the Association Amics dels Museus de Catalunya (1974), scientific collaborator of the Spanish Historical Index from 1973 and is part of several associations: former member of the Institute of Archaeology and Prehistory of the University of Barcelona and member of the Institute of Catalan Studies and patronages such as Santa Maria de Vilabertran. She has taught numerous graduate courses at several universities and institutions abroad and Spanish. She has published numerous studies on the earliest moments in the history of Catalonia, both specialized and for a wide reading public in Reviews like: Ampurias, Extremeños Studies Journal, Annals of the Institute of Empordan Studies, Pyrenae, History and Life, History 16, World Routes the National Geographic Society, Archaeology Magazine or Scientific American.

She received the Third Prize Castell del Joncar from Figueres City Council and the Choral Society Erato for a historical research on (study who had been his thesis) The Ampurdan from the Greek colonization to the Roman conquest. According to the testimony of contemporary Greek and Roman authors (published in Annals de l’Institut d’Estudis Empordanesos, 1977).

Her job as a researcher and writer takes in three interrelated fields: the Proto-history of Catalonia and Europe, the roots of the cuisine of Catalonia, including the drink (The introduction and marketing of wine in the northeast of the Iberian Peninsula in ancient times), and the translation of books and studies related to the two themes, such as the books used by the School of Architecture of Barcelona, History of architectural typologies (Pevsner, Nikolaus, original English) or History of Modern Architecture (Benevolo, Leonardo, original Italian)

== Bibliography ==
Among the monographies : The Pre-Roman Population in Northeastern Spain: genesis and development of the Iberian culture in the Girona lands (Barcelona 1984), summary of the dissertation; The pre-Roman population in northeastern Spain. Genesis and development of Iberian culture in the Girona lands, Spanish National Research Council, (CSIC, Consejo Superior de Investigaciones Científicas), Madrid – Universitat Autònoma de Barcelona, 1989, 2 vols.; Arrels Clàssiques de la cuina de la Catalunya Vella. D'Apici (s. I) a Josep Pla (segle XX) (Barcelona 1997); El territori de Llançà a l'antiguitat (Figueres, 1998).

Pedagogyc Publications : L'archeologia a Catalunya, avui (Barcelona, 1982); Els Ibers. Vida i cultura (Barcelona, 1992); La Costa Brava. Guia-album with descriptive itinerary (Barcelona, sd). He has participated in several monographs which include: L'Alimentació Mediterrània (Barcelona, 1996). She is linked to the publishing world as a technical translator in the Spanish and Catalan languages of Italian, English and French works of History and Art History.
