= Jill Pruetz =

American anthropologist and primatologist

Academic background
- Education: UIUC

Academic work
- Discipline: Anthropology
- Sub-discipline: Primatology
- Institutions: TXST
- Website: Jill Pruetz publications on Academia.edu

Jill Pruetz is an American anthropologist and primatologist. She currently works in the Department of Anthropology at Texas State University. Pruetz is known for her groundbreaking research on savanna-dwelling chimpanzees in Senegal and her uncanny ability to engage public audiences. Pruetz has worked with the National Geographic Society and National Science Foundation. Her research has also been shared by media icons such as the Today Show, BBC, and Dr. Neil de Grasse Tyson.

== Background ==
Pruetz received two bachelor's degrees, in Anthropology and Sociology, from Texas State University in 1989. Pruetz attained a PhD in anthropology in 1999, this time at the University of Illinois at Urbana-Champaign. Her dissertation research focused on the socioecology of vervet and patas monkeys, specifically investigating how food availability impacted female dominance hierarchies. For the following year Pruetz worked in a post-doctoral position at Ohio's Miami University, in the Department of Zoology. This project brought her to Senegal where she assessed the distribution of chimpanzees in savanna habitats.

Pruetz was a professor at Iowa State University’s Department of Anthropology from 2001 to 2017. In 2017, Pruetz returned to her undergraduate alma mater, Texas State University. She has been with Texas State University's Department of Anthropology ever since.

== Teaching and mentoring ==
Pruetz teaches courses in Costa Rica, Panama, and Nicaragua, and the American universities with which she is employed.

== Projects ==
Pruetz has been actively involved in education, conservation, and community-focused initiatives since she began her career as an anthropologist.

=== Fongoli Savanna Chimpanzee Project ===
In 2001, Pruetz created the Fongoli Savanna Chimpanzee Project in Senegal. This project has allowed Pruetz and other researchers to investigate the environmental pressures that influence chimpanzee behavior. The living situation of Senegal's savanna chimpanzees is unique. Most chimpanzees live in forest environments. The Fongoli team commonly compares the habits and activities of savanna and forest chimpanzees. The project also looks at possible connections between savanna chimpanzees and early hominin behavioral ecology. Pruetz's dedication to the Fongoli projects led her to create Neighbor Ape. This is a non-profit organization, which Pruetz still acts as Director for. Neighbor Ape supports local communities and chimpanzee conservation in Senegal.

Pruetz and the team at Fongoli have made some extremely interesting discoveries over the years. One of the most well-known is that the chimpanzees at Fongoli hunt with tools. Tool use occurs in numerous species, not just chimpanzees. However, the tool use at Fongoli is a little different than the tool use most commonly seen. First, these chimpanzees were using tools to actively hunt other mammals (the chimpanzees were making weapons, a specialized type of tool). Pruetz and her team were the first to record observations of this activity. The chimpanzees would sharpen the ends of their tools to a point too, rather like a spear. Pruetz and her fellow researchers also found that it was the females and immature chimpanzees who were predominantly using tools to hunt, not the males.

=== El Zota Biological Field School ===
Pruetz helped initiate the El Zota Biological Field School in Costa Rica. She now leads student groups there each year (Pruetz 2019). This field site gives students and researchers access to several nonhuman primate species, including Alouatta palliata (mantled howler monkey), Cebus imitator (white-faced capuchin), and the Endangered Ateles geoffroyi (black-handed spider monkeys).

In addition to these projects, Pruetz has collaborated with Chimp Haven National Chimpanzee Sanctuary, the Great Ape Trust of Iowa, and the National Geographic Society. Pruetz has received research support the Wenner-Gren Foundation for Anthropological Research, the Leakey Foundation, the US Fish and Wildlife Service, just to name a few.

== Popular publications ==
Chimpanzees at Fongoli, Senegal navigate a burned landscape (JD Pruetz and N Herzog)

Savanna chimpanzees, Pan troglodytes verus, hunt with tools (JD Pruetz and P Bertolani)

New evidence on the tool-assisted hunting behavior of chimpanzees in a savanna habitat at Fongoli, Senegal (JD Pruetz, P Bertolani, K Boyer Ontl, S Lindshield, M Shelley, and EG Wessling)
