= Elisabeth Krämer-Bannow =

German ethnologist (1874 – 1945)

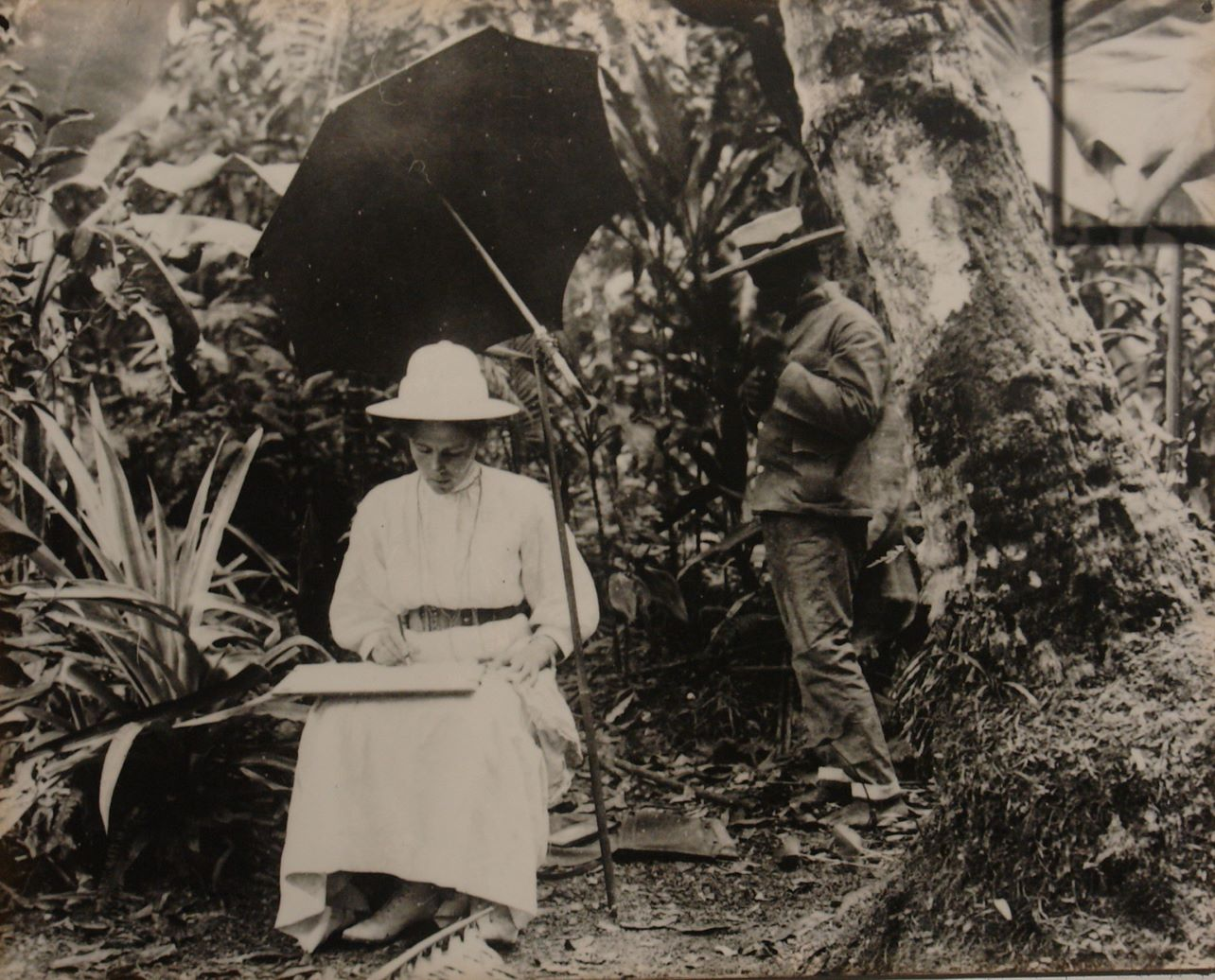
Elisabeth Krämer-Bannow

Elisabeth Krämer-Bannow (29 September 1874 – 9 January 1945) was a German ethnologist. She was one of the first Western women to explore the islands of the South Pacific. She accompanied her husband Augustin Kraemer on three of his expeditions in the German colonial territories of the Pacific. She acted as an expedition artist and painted the natives, their houses, and the local flora and fauna, often under difficult conditions.

== Biography ==
Born in Wismar, a small town in Mecklenburg-Western Pomerania, Germany, on 29 September 1874, Elisabeth Krämer-Bannow was the daughter of Adolph Bannow, a chemist, and his wife Charlotte Beckmann, who was the daughter of a pharmacist from Stuttgart. In her childhood, she showed interest in arts and weaving. Her interest was supported by her father, who was an illustrator. She was trained as a draftsperson and painter. In 1904, she married Augustin Kraemer, a German navy physician who became an anthropologist and ethnologist.

During the German administration of the territories of the Pacific, the Royal Museum of Ethnology in cooperation with the German navy commissioned a south sea expedition comprising anthropologists including Augustin Kraemer to do in-depth studies on the people and their culture. These studies were later published.

She accompanied her husband Augustin Kraemer in all three trips undertaken by him along with two ethnologists, Paul Hambruch and Ernst Sarfert, and others. In 1906/07, the first expedition was commissioned to the Palau Islands through the Bismarck Archipelago. Second one was in 1908 to New Ireland, later named as Neumecklenburg, and the final one was in 1909/10 headed to the Caroline Islands.

She was the only female member of the expedition team. Her presence became as important as the local women avoided talking to the male anthropologists. She developed her own method of research. She simply observed and experienced without asking any questions. She made number of drawings, watercolor paintings, and research notes about the rituals and customs that she observed during their expeditions. She also joined the local women in other activities including weaving, gardening, cooking and dancing. She participated in their social customs and rituals. Earlier she spent several months in Sri Lanka.

In 1916, she published her research as Among Art-loving Cannibals of the South Seas: Travels in New Ireland 1908-1909; an English translation was published in Australia in 2007.

She died on 9 January 1945 in Schorndorf.
