= Chantal Boulanger =

French anthropologist

Chantal Boulanger-Maloney (January 4, 1957 – December 27, 2004) was an anthropologist who wrote widely on South India and Tamil culture, including on the myriad of ways to wrap a Sari, documenting over 100. She lectured in France and the United States on Dravidian India and was an expert on religious beliefs and marriage rituals. She called Tamil Nadu her "spiritual home" and converted to Hinduism, spoke Hindi and Tamil, and was referred to in India by the given name "Sushila". She also wrote a novel The Goddess Justice. She died of a brain aneurism while travelling in Africa.

== Publications ==
- Saris : an illustrated guide to the Indian art of draping, 1997
