= María Elisa Velázquez Gutiérrez =

Mexican anthropologist

María Elisa Velázquez Gutiérrez is a Mexican sociologist, anthropologist, researcher, professor, and author. She is noted for her work concerning the history and culture of Mexican people of African descent (afrodescendientes in Spanish). She appeared as a historical consultant in "Mexico & Peru: The Black Grandma in the Closet", an episode of the PBS series Black in Latin America, hosted by Henry Louis Gates.

== Works ==
- Juan Correa, mulato libre, maestro pintor (1998)
- Mujeres de origen africano en la capital novohispana, siglos XVII y XVIII (2006)
- La huella negra en Guanajuato. Retratos de afrodescendientes de los siglos XIX y XX (2007)
- Afrodescendientes en México, una historia de silencio y discriminación (2012)
- vol de tmax en 2016 et trafic de stup
- proxenetariat
