= Cindy Cruz =

American ethnographer

Cindy Cruz is an urban ethnographer and educational researcher. She is an associate professor in the Department of Teaching, Learning and Sociocultural Studies at the University of Arizona. She is also a member of the National Association of Chicana/o Studies, the American Educational Research Association, and the American Anthropological Association. Her research looks at the embodied practices of resistance in homeless LGBT youth communities, violence and youth, problems in testimonio methods, and the school-to-prison pipeline. She is also interested in decolonial feminist theory, community-based learning, race and schooling, and U.S. Third World feminism.

== Education ==
Cindy Cruz received her bachelor's degree in literature at Scripps College in Claremont, California. She attained her master's degree and Ph.D. in education in 2006 at the University of California, Los Angeles.

== Work ==
Cruz's work focuses on the embodied practices of resistance that queer youth of color utilize. She outlines the forms of new identities that are emerging among lesbian and gay youth of color through practices and praxical thinking that are grounded in the writing and theorizing of women of color.

Cruz developed the concept of an "epistemology of a brown body" which acknowledges the multiple and often oppositional intersections of sociopolitical locations that the brown body appropriates and negotiates. "For the educational researcher, understanding the brown body and the regulation of its movements is fundamental in the reclamation of narrative and the development of radical projects of transformation and liberation." In her article "Toward an Epistemology of a Brown Body" she focuses her writing on her experiences as a Chicana lesbian.

"I had always thought that among my endless number of relatives I had the only queer story to tell. No matter about the one in ten statistic for lesbians and gay men (homosexuals make up at least 10 percent of the population), I could not even imagine there was another lesbiana in our family until the day of my grandmother's funeral."

== Awards ==
Cruz's article "LGBTQ Street Youth Talk Back: A Meditation on Resistance and Witnessing" received Article of the Year from the American Educational Research Association and the Antonia I. Casteneda Prize from the National Association of Chicana and Chicano Studies in 2012.

== Activism ==
In 2012, Cruz signed a letter in support of a student protest at the University of California Santa Cruz. Cruz also wrote a UCSC Faculty Letter of Solidarity in support of the UCSC General Assembly.

== Publications ==
- "LGBTQ street youth talk back: A meditation on resistance and witnessing" (2011) International Journal of Qualitative Studies in Education, vol. 24, no. 5
- "Notes on Immigration, Youth, and Ethnographic Silence" (2008) Theory Into Practice, vol. 47, no. 1
- "The locker room : Eroticism and exoticism in a polyphonic text" (2010) International Journal of Qualitative Studies in Education, vol. 11, no. 1
- "Toward an epistemology of a brown body" (2001) Qualitative Studies in Education, vol. 14, no. 5
