= Jacqueline Roumeguere-Eberhardt =

French anthropologist

Jacqueline Roumeguère-Eberhardt (27 November 1927 – 29 March 2006) was a South African-born French anthropologist, who was research director at the French National Centre for Scientific Research (CNRS). She conducted research in Southern Africa (among the Venda, Tsonga, Shona, Lozi, Bushmen), Central (among the Gbaya) and Kenya (among the Maasai, Samburu, El Molo, Rendille and unidentified hominids), which led her to develop the Totemic Geography of Africa (TGA) project. During her career, she has collected a substantial archive of fieldwork material, including interviews, notes, audio and audiovisual recordings, photographs, and objects). She is the author of numerous scientific publications (articles, books and movies) in French and English.

== Sources ==
- Roumeguère Isabelle, Zanger Pierre.Memorendum, Jacqueline Roumegère-Eberhardt, In: Outre-mers, tome 93, n°352-353, 2e semestre 2006. savoirs autochtones XIXe-XXe siècles, sous la direction de Sophie Dulucq et Colette Zytnicki. pp. 396-399. Link to the publication
