= Marika Moisseeff =

French social anthropologist and psychiatrist

Marika Moisseeff is a French social anthropologist and psychiatrist.

Moisseeff has done extensive research on sexes and procreation, initiation rites, youth, parent-child relations, and aboriginal society and culture in general. She is currently head of research at CNRS.

As well as her scientific work, she wrote on "Aliens as an Invasive Reproductive Power in Science Fiction", discussing among other matters the reproductive culture and the parasitic nature of "alien" pregnancy.

== Bibliography ==
- 1999 An Aboriginal Village in South Australia. A Snapshot of Davenport. Canberra, Aboriginal Studies Press.
- 1995 Un long chemin semé d'objets cultuels: le cycle initiatique aranda. Paris, Editions de l'Ecole des Hautes Etudes en Sciences Sociales, Coll. Cahiers de l'Homme.
