= Vibha Tripathi =

Indian archaeologist

Vibha Tripathi (born 5 February 1948) is an Indian archaeologist. She graduated from the University of Allahabad and in 1973 obtained her PhD from the Banaras Hindu University for her thesis titled "The Painted Grey Ware - A Protohistoric Culture". She has worked in the field of Proto-historic and Early-Historic Archaeology and Archaeometallurgy and has published around more than 200 research papers. As of 2019, she is a Professor Emeritus at the Department of Ancient History and Archaeology, Banaras Hindu University.

== Select publications ==
=== Books ===
- Tripathi, V. 1976. Painted Grey Ware - An Iron Age Culture of Northern India. New Delhi: Concept Publication Company.
- Tripathi, V. 1994. The Indus Terracotta. New Delhi: Sharda Publishing House.
- Tripathi, V. (Ed.) 1998. Archaeometallurgy in India. New Delhi: Sharda Publishing House.
- Tripathi, V. 2001. The Age of Iron in South Asia: Legacy and Tradition. New Delhi: Aryan Books International.
- Tripathi, V. 2007. History of Iron Technology in India (From the beginning to pre-modern times). New Delhi: Rupa and Company.
- Tripathi, V. 2010 Archaeology of Ganga Basin: Shifting Paradigms New Delhi: Sharda Publishing House Vol. 1.
- Tripathi, V. 2010 Archaeology of Ganga Basin: Shifting Paradigms New Delhi: Sharda Publishing House Vol. 2.
- Tripathi, V. 2012 Rise of Civilization in the Gangetic Plain: The Context of Painted Grey Ware, Delhi, Aryan Books International
- . Tripathi, V. 2014. Anai: A rural Settlement of Ancient Varanasi. Delhi: Sharada Publishing House.
- Tripathi, V. 2014. Archaeomaterials in Early Cultures of Middle Ganga Plain. ( Excavations at Khairadih (1996-97), District Ballia, (U.P.)
- Tripathi, V. Mining and Metallurgy in Ancient India (under preparation)
