= Elizabeth K. Briody =

American anthropologist and author

- Born: Beverly, Massachusetts, U.S.
- Occupations: Cultural anthropologist, writer

Academic background
- Education: Wheaton College; University of Texas at Austin

Academic work
- Discipline: Anthropology
- Sub-discipline: Cultural anthropology; applied anthropology; organizational culture

Elizabeth K. Briody is an American cultural anthropologist and writer known for research on organizational culture and applied anthropology.

== Early life and education ==
Briody was raised in Beverly, Massachusetts. She attended Catholic school before transferring to public school. In her final year of high school, she was accepted into the American Field Service program and spent a year in France, where she attended a French lycée. She completed the French baccalauréat before returning to the United States.

Briody earned a B.A. in anthropology from Wheaton College in 1978. She later received an M.A. and Ph.D. in anthropology from the University of Texas at Austin.

== Career ==
Briody joined General Motors (GM) in 1985 as a Senior Research Scientist in the company’s research and development organization. Working as a cultural anthropologist, she conducted ethnographic research on organizational culture and organizational change, including workplace practices and collaboration in manufacturing and corporate settings. She later became Technical Fellow at GM before leaving during its bankruptcy in 2009.

In 2009 she founded her consulting firm Cultural Keys LLC in Michigan.

She has held faculty positions at Michigan State University, Wayne State University, Purdue University, Northern Arizona University, and Central Michigan University.

Briody served as president of the National Association for the Practice of Anthropology from 1994 to 1996, and also served as secretary of the American Anthropological Association. In 2021, Briody founded the Anthropology Career Readiness Network (ACRN), a volunteer-led network that publishes career-related resources for anthropology students.

== Publications ==
She has authored and co-authored books on applied anthropology and organizational culture. She published Household Labor Patterns Among Mexican Americans in South Texas: Buscando Trabajo Seguro in 1986. In 2008 she co-edited Partnering for Organizational Performance: Collaboration and Culture in the Global Workplace with Robert T. Trotter II. In 2010 she co-authored Transforming Culture: Creating and Sustaining a Better Manufacturing Organization with Robert T. Trotter II and Tracy L. Meerwarth. In 2018 she co-edited Cultural Change from a Business Anthropology Perspective with Maryann McCabe. She is also the co-author of multiple editions of the textbook The Cultural Dimension of Global Business, most recently the ninth edition in 2023.

== Awards and honours ==
She received the Morton H. Fried Award of the American Anthropological Association for the paper "Explaining Differences in Repatriation Experiences: The Discovery of Coupled and Decoupled Systems," which she co-authored with Marietta L. Baba and was published in American Anthropologist in 1991. In 2012, she received the Robert B. Textor and Family Prize for Excellence in Anticipatory Anthropology for her book Transforming Culture. Briody received the Bronislaw Malinowski Award from the Society for Applied Anthropology in 2020.
