= Michael M. Cernea =

Romanian-born anthropologist and sociologist (1931–2026)

Michael Musi Cernea (born Mihail Musi Cernea; October 14, 1931 – September 10, 2026) was a Romanian-born sociologist and anthropologist who reestablished himself in the United States in 1974. He is widely recognized for introducing sociological and anthropological approaches into the World Bank. Cernea worked as the World Bank's Senior Adviser for Sociology and Social Policy until 1997. He published on a wide range of the effects of development, including social change, social forestry, participation, grassroots organizations, and population resettlement. Cernea was the author of the term "development-induced displacement and resettlement".

Judith Freidenberg reports Cernea as arguing that "Development Anthropology is a Contact Sport".

== Life and career ==
Mihail Musi Cernea was born in Iași, Romania on October 14, 1931. After graduating from the Faculty of Philosophy of the University of Bucharest in 1954, he started working as assistant researcher in the Institute of Philosophy of the Romanian Academy in 1958, became principal researcher, defended his PhD in 1962 and became the Chief of the Institute’s social research section soon thereafter. During the 1960s, he helped break the official publication on empirical anthropological research in Romania at that time by shifting the research section he led at the institute of Philosophy from general social philosophy to empirical sociological field investigations in industrial and rural sociology. He was invited as visiting researcher at the Centre D’Etudes Sociologiques in Paris (1967) and as Fellow in residence at the Center for Advanced Studies in the Behavioral Sciences (CASBS), Stanford, USA in 1970–1971. The European Society for Rural Sociology elected him as Vice-President (1973–1977). The Romanian Academy awarded Cernea the Vasile Conta Prize, and other prizes and distinctions for his research publications.

In mid 1974, Cernea emigrated to the United States, where he lived, taught and practiced for the longest part of his professional sociological and anthropological career. In August 1974, the World Bank in Washington, D.C. selected him as its first in-house sociologist, then as its Senior Sociologist, and Senior Adviser for Social Policy and Sociology from 1982 to 1997. Between 1998 and 2003 he was appointed member of the CGIAR Science Council (the group of 16 International Agricultural Research Centers). Professor Cernea has also served as Senior Social Adviser to international organizations such as the UN, OECD, UNDP, ADB, CGIAR, FAO, BP, Chevron, etc. on social policy, development, cultural and poverty issues. He was elected as officer in various capacities for international and national professional social science organizations, including as Vice-President of The Gusti Foundation (Romania) after 1990. He worked also for non-profit organizations, serving as Director in the Board of PACT (USA), and was a member of the Board of Trustees of the Bibliotheca Alexandrina (Egypt)(2000-2008).

Cernea died on September 10, 2026, at the age of 94.

== Contributions ==
At the World Bank, Cernea gradually recruited, established and led a large community of development sociologists and anthropologists, placing these social disciplines on the World Bank’s intellectual map and broadening its skill mix. Cernea decisively helped to gain a place for development-oriented social research in the Bank and professional, applied sociological work in Bank’s operations. He authored, or contributed to defining and writing, some of the Bank's main social policies, particularly its policies on involuntary population resettlement, on indigenous populations, protection of “chance finds” cultural artifacts, cooperation with NGOs, the World Bank strategy for cultural heritage preservation and management, water and irrigation, reforestation, agricultural extension, and others.

In the field, Cernea has carried out social research on policy and operational development issues in hydropower, agriculture, irrigation, forestry, mining, and other sectors, as well as direct project design and evaluation work in many countries. among which: India, Nepal, China, Papua-Indonesia, Thailand, Burma, the Philippines, Pakistan, Moldova, Kenya, Tanzania, Morocco, Yemen, Mexico, Turkey, Togo, Ukraine, and others. He also worked as member of several International Development Expert Panels.

== Recognition ==
Cernea lectured in Universities in the United States, Europe, India, Japan, and China. In 1979–1980, he was a Fellow in Residence at the Netherlands Institute for Advanced Study (NIAS) in Wassenaar/the Hague. Harvard University invited him as Visiting Scholar in its Department of Anthropology and in the Harvard Institute for International Development (HIID) in the academic year 1990-1991. He also was Research Professor of Anthropology and International Affairs at George Washington University, where for several years he taught development anthropology and population resettlement. The Hohai University (Nanjing, China) appointed him as Honorary Professor of Social Development and Resettlement in 1992 and the China Three Gorges University (Yichang, China) appointed him Professor Emeritus. For his scholarly work on public policies, he received the Solon T. Kimball Award for Public Policy and Applied Anthropology from the American Anthropological Association, and the Bronislaw Malinowski Prize from the international Society for Applied Anthropology.

== Publications ==
Cernea authored and edited many books on the sociology of development: on social change, population displacement and resettlement, impoverishment and poverty reduction, cultural heritage protection, social forestry, grassroots organizations, sustainability and participation. His most recent books are: Researching the Culture in Agri-Culture (2006) and Cultural Heritage and Development: A Framework for Action in the Middle East and North Africa (2001, 2003). Among his other books are: Putting People First: Sociological Variables in Development (several editions, also translated in Japan, Mexico, China, Indonesia, and France), Research-Extension-Farmer: A Two-Way Continuum (1985); Anthropological Approaches to Resettlement: Policy, Practice, Theory (ed. with Scott Guggenheim, 1993); Resettlement and Development (1994, with S. Guggenheim and assoc.; Social Organization and Development Anthropology (1996); Social Assessment for Better Development (ed. with Ayse Kudat, 1997); Resettlement and Development (vol. I and II, published in China, 1996-1998); The Economics of Involuntary Resettlement (1999): and Risks and Reconstruction. Experiences of Resettlers and Refugees (2000, ed. with C. McDowell).

Key publications:

- (1983) A Social Methodology for Community Participation in Local Investments: The Experience of Mexico's PIDER Program.
- (1985, 1st ed; 1991, 2nd ed) Putting People First: Sociological Variables in Development, Oxford University Press.
- (1995) Primero la gente: Variables sociológicas en el desarrollo rural (PPF - Spanish Ed. Fondo de Cultura Económica, Mexico City).
- (1998) La dimension humaine dans les projets de développement: Les variables sociologiques et culturelles (PPF - French Edition).
- (1998) 以人为本：社会变量在发展中 (PPF - Chinese Edition, Hohai University Press).
- (1998) 人々を第一に考える：開発における社会学的変数 (PPF - Japanese Edition, Tokyo).
- (1988) Mengutamakan Manusia di Dalam Pembangunan: Vairabel-variabel Sosiologi di dalam Pembangunan Pedesaan (PPF - Bahasa Edition, Indonesia).
- (1988) Involuntary Resettlement in Development Projects: Policy Guidelines in World Bank-Financed Projects.
- (1993) Anthropological Approaches to Resettlement: Policy, Practice, Theory (ed. with Scott Guggenheim).
- (1996) Social Organization and Development Anthropology. Malinowski Award Lecture.
- (1996) 移民安置与发展：世界银行移民安置政策和经验研究 (Resettlement and Development: Studies on World Bank Resettlement Policies and Experiences) (vol. I, Ed. of Chinese Edition Shi Guoqing, Hohai University Press. Nanjing, China).
- (1997) Social Assessments for Better Development: Case Studies in Russia and Central Asia (ed. with Ayse Kudat).
- (1998) 移民安置与发展：世界银行移民安置政策和经验研究 (Resettlement and Development: Studies on World Bank Resettlement Policies and Experiences) (vol. II, Ed. of Chinese Edition Shi Guoqing, Hohai University Press. Nanjing, China).
- (1999) The Economics of Involuntary Resettlement: Questions and Social Challenges. World Bank, Washington DC.
- (2001) Cultural Heritage and Development: A Framework for Action in the Middle East and North Africa.
- (2003) Patrimoine culturel et développement: Cadre d'action pour le Moyen-Orient et l'Afrique du Nord (French Edition).
- (2006) Researching the Culture in Agri-Culture: Social Research for International Development.
- (2007) Risk Analysis and the Risks and Reconstruction Model: Training Course on Population Resettlement. ADB Manila.
- (2008) Can Compensation Prevent Impoverishment? Reforming Resettlement through Investments and Benefit-Sharing (ed. with H. M. Mathur; Oxford Univ. Press).
- (2018) Challenging the Prevailing Paradigm of Displacement and Resettlement: Risks, Impoverishment, Legacies, Solutions (ed. with J. K. Maldonado. Routledge).

Major development reports:

- (1986) Involuntary Resettlement in Bank-Assisted Projects: A Review of the Application of Bank Policies in FY 1979-85 WB Projects.
- (1996) Resettlement and Development: Bankwide Review of Projects Involving Involuntary Resettlement (w. S. Guggenheim, D. Aaronson, and W. vanWicklin) (published in China, vol. I) (edited with Shi Guoqing, Hohai University).
- (1998) Resettlement and Development: Bankwide Review of Projects Involving Involuntary Resettlement (w. S. Guggenheim, D. Aaronson, and W. van Wicklin) (published in China, vol. II)(edited with Shi Guoqing, Hohai University).
- (2008) Institutions and Capacity Building for Resettlement in Ilisu: Report on the Second Field Visit of the Committee of Experts (vol I, vol. II).
- (2012) Monitoring of Population Resettlement in Cambodia's Railway Rehabilitation Project: Current Status, Strengths, Weaknesses, and Recommendations.

Books published in Romania:

- (1967) Sociologia Muncii: Mișcarea Inovatorilor (Sociology of Work: The Innovator's Movement) (with M. Micu and V. Dumitrescu).
- (1970) Două Sate: Structuri Sociale și Progres Technic (Social Structures and Technical Progress) (with Henri H. Stahl, Gh. Chepes, M. Larionescu, El. Gheorghe, H. Ene. (Editura Politică).
- (1970) Contributii la Sociologia Culturii de Masă (The Sociology of Mass Culture) (with F. Albert and assoc.).
- (1971) Sociologia Muncii: Resurse Umane ale Întreprinderii (Sociology of Work) (with M. Popescu and H. Ene).
- (1974) Sociologia americana: Tendinte și controverse (American Sociology: Trends and Controversies. Dialogues with Reuben Hill, Immanuel Wallerstein, Alvin Bertrand, Stanton Wheeler, John Kunkel, Elliot Aronson).
- (1974) Sociologia Cooperativei Agricole (Sociology of the Agricultural Cooperative).

== Awards ==
- Romanian Academy (elected titular member in 2012; elected corresponding member in 1991)
- Solon T. Kimball Award (1988) for Public Policy and Applied Anthropology - American Anthropological Association. "This award is to honor your outstanding contributions to applied anthropology and public policy. Your effectiveness is particularly recognized in expanding the scope of anthropology in the development programs of the World Bank and advancing the cause of 'Putting People First.'"
- Bronislaw Malinowski Award (1995) - Society for Applied Anthropology "in recognition of a career dedicated to the understanding of the social sciences and the application of those disciplines to the needs of the people of the world."
- Omnia Opera Prize (2012) from Romania's Society of Sociologists, "for contributions to the science of sociology along his entire work."
