= Bronislaw Malinowski Award =

Social science award

The Bronislaw Malinowski Award is an award given by the US-based Society for Applied Anthropology (SfAA) in honor of Bronisław Malinowski (1884–1942), an original member and strong supporter of the Society. Briefly established in 1950, the award has been presented annually since 1973.

It is given to an outstanding senior scholar in recognition for a lifetime commitment to the application of the social sciences to contemporary social issues. The acceptance addresses of the awardees are usually published in the society's journal, Human Organization.

== Past recipients of the Malinowski Award ==
Year	Recipient	Nationality
1973	Gonzalo Aguirre Beltrán	Mexico
1974	Everett C. Hughes	USA
1975	Gunnar Myrdal	Sweden
1976	Edward H. Spicer	USA
1977	Sol Tax	USA
1978	Juan Comas	Mexico
1979	Laura Maud Thompson	USA
1980	Fei Xiaotung	People's Republic of China
1981	Raymond Firth	UK
1982	George M. Foster	USA
1983	Omer Stewart	USA
1984	Alexander H. Leighton	USA
1985	Elizabeth Colson	USA
1986	Philleo Nash	USA
1987	Margaret Lantis	USA
1988	Fred Richardson	USA
1989	Lauriston Sharp	USA
1990	St. Clair Drake	USA
1991	Conrad M. Arensberg	USA
1992	Margaret Clark	USA
1993	Ronald Frankenberg	UK
1994	Claudio Esteva Fabregat	Spain
1995	Michael M. Cernea	USA
1996	Bea Medicine	USA
1997	Ward Goodenough	USA
1998	Robert and Beverly Hackenberg	USA
1999	Thayer Scudder	USA
2000	Maria Eugenia Bozzoli	Costa Rica
2001	Walter Goldschmidt	USA
2002	Pertti Pelto	Finland / USA
2003	Carlos Vélez Ibáñez	USA
2004	John W. Bennett	USA
2005	Paul L. Doughty	USA
2006	Michael Horowitz	USA
2007	Gretel Pelto	USA
2008	Orlando Fals Borda	Colombia
2009	Thomas Weaver	USA
2010	Jean Schensul	USA
2011	Salomón Nahmad Sittón	Mexico
2012	Clifford Barnett	USA
2013	Anthony Oliver-Smith	USA
2014	Paul Durrenberger	USA
2015	Frances Fox Piven	USA
2016	Paul Farmer	USA
2017	Louise Lamphere	USA
2018	Jorge Durand and Douglas Massey	Mexico & USA
2019	Spero Manson	USA
2020	Elizabeth K. Briody	USA
2021	Leo R. Chavez	USA
2022	Faye V. Harrison	USA
2023	Lenore Manderson	South Africa
2024	Patricia Clay	USA
2025	Ralph Bolton	USA

== See also ==
- List of anthropology awards
