= Beatrice Medicine =

American anthropologist

Beatrice "Bea" Medicine
- Híŋša Wašté Aglí Wiŋ
- Born: August 1, 1923; Standing Rock Indian Reservation, Wakpala, South Dakota
- Died: December 19, 2005 (aged 82); Bismarck, North Dakota
- Occupations: anthropologist, scholar, educator

Academic background
- Education: South Dakota State University, B.A. Anthropology, 1945 Michigan State University, M.A. Sociology and Anthropology, 1954 University of Wisconsin, Ph.D., Cultural Anthropology, 1983

Academic work
- Discipline: anthropology, Native and Indigenous studies
- Sub-discipline: mental health, women's issues, bilingual education, alcohol and drug use, ethno-methodologies and Native research methods, children and identity issues

Beatrice Medicine (Lakota: Híŋša Wašté Aglí Wiŋ, lit. 'Returns Victorious with a Red Horse Woman'; August 1, 1923 - December 19, 2005) was a Sihasapa and Minneconjou Lakota scholar, anthropologist, and educator known for her work in the fields of Indigenous languages, cultures, and history. Medicine spent much of her life researching, teaching, and serving Native communities, primarily in the fields of bilingual education, addiction and recovery, mental health, tribal identity, and women's, children's, and LGBT community issues.

== Early life ==
Medicine was born on the Standing Rock Reservation in Wakpala, South Dakota on the 1st of August, 1923.

== Education ==
Funded by a Laverne Noyes Scholarship, Medicine earned her BA in anthropology at South Dakota State University in 1945. She went on to teach in a number of roles between 1945 and 1951, including for a number of Native institutions: the Haskell Indian Institute (B.I.A.), 1947-1948, Santo Domingo Pueblo, 1949-1950, the Albuquerque Indian School, 1950-1951, and the Flandreau Indian School, 1950-1954. Beginning in 1951, she went back to school to attend Michigan State University, partially funded by the Illinois Federation of Women's Clubs Fellowships and a John Hay Whitney Foundation Fellowship, alongside acting as a Research Assistant in the Sociology and Anthropology department. She earned her MA in both Sociology and Anthropology from Michigan State University in 1954. She completed her Ph.D in 1983 at the University of Wisconsin.

== Career ==
Medicine studied the human behaviors involved in racism and linguistic discrimination, in both academia and social anthropology. Much of her work focused on the resurgence, survivance, and expansion of Indigenous languages and culture. Medicine was known internationally for her work with students and faculty, and over her 50-year career as faculty, visiting professor, and scholar-in-residence at thirty-one universities and colleges in the United States and Canada, including Santo Domingo Pueblo Agency School, Flandreau Indian School, the University of British Columbia, Stanford University, Dartmouth College, Mount Royal College (now Mount Royal University), San Francisco State University, the University of Washington, the University of Montana and the University of South Dakota. She retired as Professor Emeritus of Anthropology at California State University, Northridge.

In her book, Learning to Be an Anthropologist and Remaining Native, Medicine playfully attributed her multi-institutional career as a result of embracing the traditional roots of the Lakota: "as far as moving so often is concerned, I jokingly refer to the former nomadism of my people". Her lifelong commitment as a scholar and educator resulted in numerous publications, speeches, lectures, and studies, for many which Medicine received honourable accolades and awards recognizing her pursuits for equity in human rights.

Medicine was actively involved in civil rights struggles in the Indigenous communities of Seattle, Vancouver, and Calgary. In 1974 Medicine testified alongside Vine Deloria Jr. as an expert witness in the federal case brought against those involved in the Wounded Knee incident. In 1984, Medicine was elected to the Common Cause National Governing Board, a nonprofit organization built with the intent on "holding power accountable". In 1993-94 Medicine took a stand for her beliefs and respect for the role of women in Indigenous cultures by accepting a position in the Women's Branch of Canada's Royal Commission on Aboriginal Peoples, seeing this as acting as a voice for the people to fight for the legal rights of Indigenous families.

Medicine's commitment to social action did not end when she retired from her career as a teacher and scholar in the early 1990s. Upon returning to her home on the Standing Rock Indian Reservation in South Dakota she assisted in the efforts to build a new public school for the community. She also sat on the Pardon Board and the Wakpala-Smee School District School board.

== Death ==
Beatrice Medicine died during an emergency surgery on 19 December 2005, in Bismarck, North Dakota. In accordance with her wishes there was no funeral service. Her family requested that, rather than collect flowers for a gravesite, friends and family instead donate to the American Indian College Fund in Denver, Colorado.

Medicine is survived by her sister Grace V Yardley, her son Ted Sitting Crow Garner, and her adopted daughter JoAllyn Archambault, who is also an anthropologist.

== Legacy ==
In 2006 AltaMira Press published Drinking and Sobriety Among the Lakota Sioux, a work they had been producing with Medicine in the days prior to her death. This work examines the role of harmful Stereotypes of indigenous peoples of Canada and the United States in relation to alcoholism which Medicine originally presented in her 1969 article "The Changing Dakota Family and the Stresses Therein," in The Pine Ridge Research Journal.

In honour of Medicine and her lifelong dedication to education, The Society for Applied Anthropology (SfAA) created the Beatrice Medicine Award, a scholarship travel grant of $750 to assist in attending the Annual Meeting of the SfAA. It is awarded to three students who have been enrolled as a student during part of the current year and must have an accepted paper or poster abstract for the SfAA Annual Meeting program.

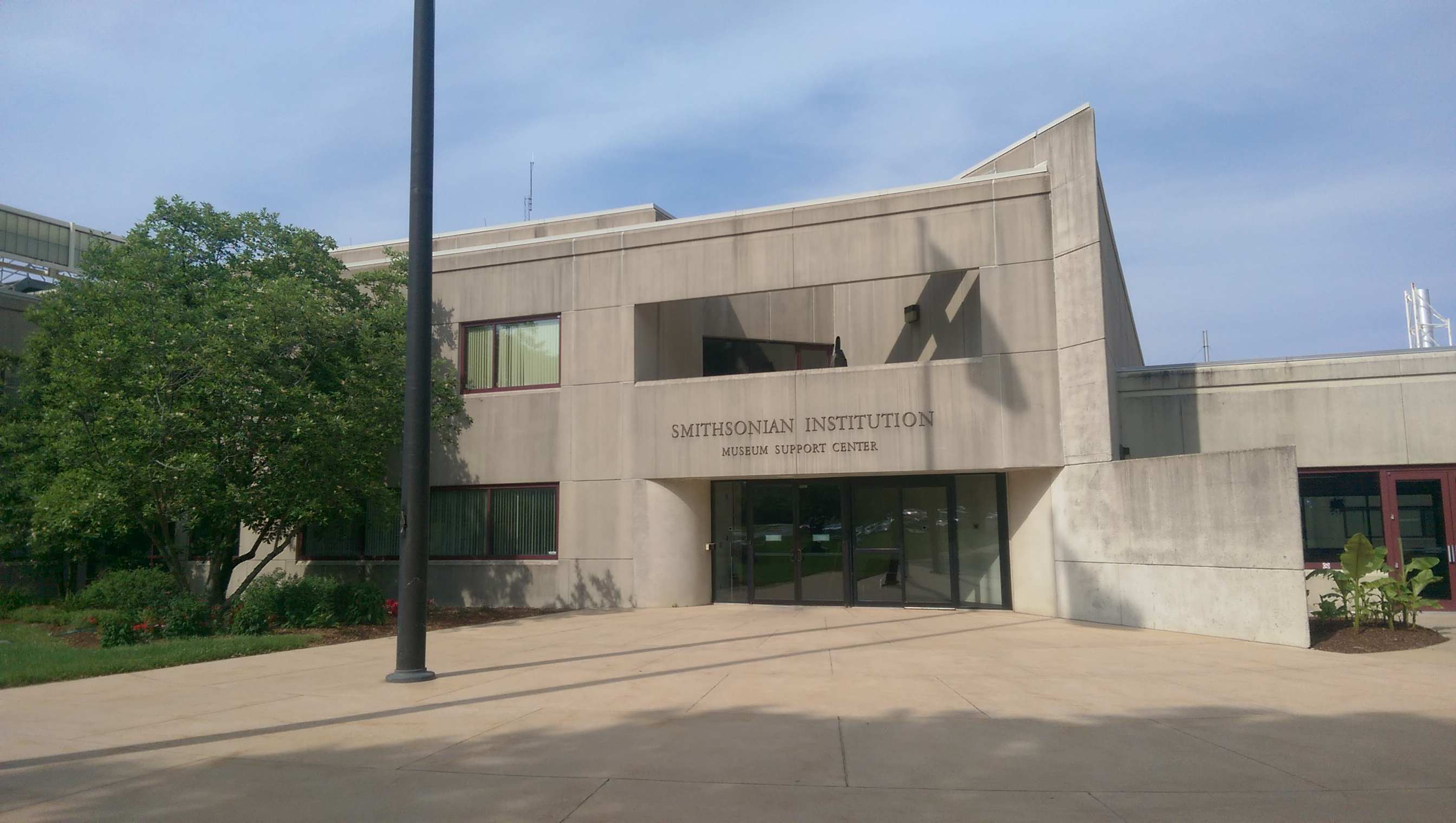
Smithsonian's Museum Support Center in Suitland, Maryland, where Dr. Medicine's papers can be accessed.

Her papers are archived in the National Anthropological Archives at the Smithsonian Institution.

== Awards ==
- (1991) Distinguished Service Award from the American Anthropological Association.
- (1996) Bronislaw Malinowski Award from the Society for Applied Anthropology.
- (2005) George and Louise Spindler Award for Education in Anthropology from the American Anthropological Association.
- Ohana Award from the American Counseling Association].
- Outstanding Woman of Color Award from the National Institute of Women of Color.
- Honoring Our Allies Award from the National Gay and Lesbian Task Force.

== Published work ==
=== Collaborative works ===
- (1973). "The Native American" in Don Speigel and Patricia Keith-Speigel eds. The Outsiders. New York: Rinehart and Winston Holt.
- (1976) "The Schooling Process: Some Lakota (Sioux) Views" in Craig J. Calhoun and Francis A. Janni eds. The Anthropological Study of Education. The Hague: Mouton.
- (1983). "Warrior Women." The Hidden Half: Studies of Plains Indian Women. Patricia Albers, ed. ISBN 9780819129567.
- (1987). "My Elders Tell Me" in J.Barman, Y. Hebert and D.McCaskill eds. Indian Education in Canada, vol 2. Vancouver: University of British Columbia Press.
- (1987). "Indian Women and the Renaissance of Traditional Religion" in Raymond J. DeMallie and Douglas R. Parks eds. pp. 159–171. Sioux Indian Religion, Tradition and Innovation. Norman and London: University of Oklahoma Press.
- (1987). "The Role of American Indian Women in Cultural Continuity and Transition" in J. Penfield ed. Women and Language in Transition. Albany: SUNY Press.
- (1988). "Ella Cara Deloria" in Ute Gacs, Aisha Khan, Jerry McIntyre and Ruth Weinberg eds. pp. 45–50. Women Anthropologists: a Biographical Dictionary. New York: Greenwood Press.
- (1997). "Changing Native American Roles in an Urban Context and Changing Native American Sex Roles in an Urban Context" in Sue-Ellen Jacobs, Wesley Thomas and Sabine Lang eds. Two-Spirit People: Native American Gender Identity, Sexuality, and Spirituality. Urbana and Chicago: University of Illinois Press.
- (1997). "Lakota Star Quilts: Commodity, Ceremony and Economic Development" in Marsha L. MacDowell and C. Kurt Dedwhurst eds. To Honor and Comfort: Native American Quilting Traditions. Museum of New Mexico Press and Michigan State University Museum.
- (1999). "Ella Cara Deloria: Early Lakota Ethnologist (Newly Discovered Novelist)" in R. Darnell and L. Valentine eds. The Americanist Tradition. Toronto: University of Toronto Press.

=== Articles and journals ===
- (1969) "The Changing Dakota Family and the Stresses Therein." Pine Ridge Research Bulletin, No. 9, pp. 13–23.
- (1971). "The Anthropologist and American Indian Studies Programs." Indian Historian, No. 4, pp. 15–18.
- (1971). "Anthropology as the Indian's Image Maker." Indian Historian, Vol. 4, No.3, pp. 27–29.
- (1973). "Finders Keepers?" Museum News, No. 51, pp. 20–26.
- (1975). "Self-Direction in Sioux Education." Integrateducation, No. 78, pp. 15–17.
- (1976). "Oral History as Truth: Validity in recent Court Cases Involving Native Americans." Folklore Forum, Bibliographic and Special Series, Vol. 9, No. 15, pp. 1–5.
- (1978). "Higher Education: a New Arena for Native Americans." Thresholds in Education, No. 4, pp. 22–25.
- (1980). "Ella Cara Deloria, the Emic Voice." Melus (Multi-Ethnic Literature in the U.S.), Vol. 7, No. 4, pp. 23–30.
- (1980). "American Indian Women: Mental Health Issues which Relate to Drug Abuse." Wíčazo Ša Review: a Journal of Native American Studies, No. 9, pp. 85–89.
- (1980). "American Indian Women: Spirituality and Status." Bread and Roses, No. 2, pp. 15–18.
- (1981). "American Indian Family Cultural Change and Adaptive Strategies." Journal of Ethnic Studies, No. 8, pp. 13–23.
- (1981). "'Speaking Indian': Parameters of Language Use among American Indians." Focus: National Clearinghouse for Bilingual Education, No. 6, pp. 3–10.
- (1981). "The Interaction of Culture and Sex Roles in Schools." Integrateducation, Special Issue: American Indian Education, No. 19, pp. 28–37.
- (1981). "Native American Resistance to Integration: Contemporary Confrontations and Religious Revitalization." Plains Anthropologist, Vol. 26, No. 1, pp. 277–86.
- (1982). "New Roads to Coping: Siouan Sobriety" in S.M. Manson ed. New Directions in Prevention among American Indian and Alaska Native Communities. Portland: Oregon Health Sciences University.
- (1983). "Indian Women: Tribal Identity as Status Quo." Women's Nature: Rationalizations of Inequality. New York: Teachers College Press.
- (1986). "Contemporary Cultural Revisitation: Bilingual and Bicultural Education." Wíčazo Ša Review: a Journal of Native American Studies, No. 2, pp. 31–35.
- (1988). "Native American (Indian) Women: A Call for Research." Anthropology and Education Quarterly, Vol. 19, No. 2, pp. 86–92.
- (1990). "'Carrying the Culture: American Indian and Alaska Native Women Workers' Wider Opportunity for Women Inc." Risks and Challenges: Women, Work and the Future, pp. 53–60.
- (1993). "North American Indigenous Women and Cultural Domination." American Indian Culture and Research Journal, Vol. 17, No. 2, pp. 121–30.
- (1998). "Alcohol and Aborigines: the North American Perspective." Alcoholic Beverage Medical Research Journal, No. 8, pp. 7–11.
- (1998). "American Indians and Anthropologists: Issues of History, Empowerment, and Application." Human Organization, Vol. 57, No. 3, pp. 253–57.

=== Films ===
- (1999). Seeking the Spirit: Plains Indians in Russia. Liucija Baskauskas, dir. Documentary Educational Resources.
