= Laura Maud Thompson =

American social anthropologist

- Born: January 23, 1905; Honolulu, Territory of Hawaii
- Died: January 28, 2000 (aged 95); Honolulu, Hawaii, U.S.
- Occupation: Anthropologist
- Spouse(s): Bernhard Teuting, John Collier (1943–?), Sam Duker (1963–1978)
- Awards: Bronislaw Malinowski Award (1979)

Academic background
- Education: Mills College (BA); University of California, Berkeley (PhD)
- Doctoral advisor: A. L. Kroeber
- Influences: Bronisław Malinowski, Robert Lowie

Academic work
- Discipline: Socio-cultural anthropologist
- Sub-discipline: Culture of the CHamoru people of Guam; cultures of the Native Americans
- Institutions: Consultant on Native Affairs to the Naval Governor of Guam; Coordinator, Indian Education, Personality, and Administration Project; teaching positions at many institutions (see article for list)
- Notable works: Guam and Its People

Laura Maud Thompson (January 23, 1905 ― January 28, 2000) was an American social anthropologist best known for her studies of CHamoru culture in Guam. She studied many cultures around the world, including Native American nations, with the self-professed aim of "trying to build an integrated theory of human group behavior that was grounded in actual behavior and relied on rigorous methods of verification to ensure reliability." She was the recipient of the 1979 Bronislaw Malinowski Award from the Society for Applied Anthropology.

== Early life and education ==
Thompson was born in Honolulu on January 23, 1905, to an English man and a mother from California. Her mother homeschooled her and her older sister so they would not learn to speak Hawaiian Pidgin. Thompson received her secondary education at the Punahou School. She graduated from Mills College in 1927 with a Bachelor of Arts degree and then worked as a social worker for a year in the slums of Boston. Thompson enrolled in Radcliff College because Harvard University was not accepting women. However, she left after one year.

Thompson earned a PhD in anthropology from the University of California, Berkeley in 1937, under the mentorship of A. L. Kroeber. She was only the second person, after Ralph Linton, to earn a PhD in Pacific archaeology. Thompson later described herself as one of "Kroeber's girls," "a group of young women who became known for their far-flung explorations in various parts of the world." Thompson identified the other "Kroeber's girls" as Isabelle Kelley, Cora Du Bois, Dorothy Demetracapoulou, Margaret Lantis, and Katharine Luomala.

== Career ==
In 1929, she took a position as an assistant ethnologist at the Bishop Museum in Honolulu, initially to describe the Hans G. Hornbostel collection from the Mariana Islands. As part of her work, Thompson provided the only published description of the intact set of latte stones at Mepo' that would become the centerpiece of Latte Stone Park in Hagåtña, Guam in the 1950s. Museum director Herbert E. Gregory, described as "impatient and dictatorial," berated staff with such regularity that a room down the hall from his office was designated the "Weeping Room" to allow staff to recover from his tirades. However, Thompson reported herself hooked by the field. With a Bishop Museum fellowship, she conducted her first field research in 1933, studying traditional exchange and settlement patterns in the Lau Islands of southern Fiji.

In 1938, the Naval governor of Guam requested that Thompson serve as his consultant on Native Affairs to suggest improvements to the educational and welfare systems for CHamorus. She thus became the first anthropologist to conduct formal studies on Guam. She conducted a "six-month field study of the native Chamorro population, their daily life, land use customs, changing economy, schooling, cultural values, and local government under American military rule since 1899." While stationed in Hagåtña, she soon set up a field headquarters in Merizo. Her primary female field assistant, Rosa Aguigui Reyes, was the first woman elected to the Guam Congress. The resulting work, Guam and Its People, was described after her death by Guam's Delegate Robert Underwood as "the seminal work on the essence of the Chamorro culture" in his tribute on the floor of the United States House of Representatives. In 1943, the U.S. Navy hired Thompson to tell them how the CHamorus of Guam were fairing under Japanese occupation and whether they would welcome the U.S. retaking of the island, which occurred in 1944. Thompson enjoyed producing several reports for the Navy as she felt that this was in line with her belief that anthropology should be a predictive social science.

After the Second World War, Thompson was not allowed to return to Guam for many years, principally because of her activities in lobbying for the people of Guam in Washington DC to advance their political autonomy.

Thompson held a research position in the Committee on Human Development at the University of Chicago in 1941 when she received a grant to serve as the Coordinator of the Indian Education, Personality and Administration Project. The Project evaluated the government policies implemented since the Indian Reorganization Act of 1934. As such, Thompson spent time with the Tohono O'odham, Hopi, Navajo, Zuni, and Dakota "studying ways in which culturally standardized perception patterns and personality modes were used to solve social and cultural problems." She was particularly interested in the psyche of the Hopi, authoring several papers with neuropsychiatrist Alice Joseph.

In 1945, Collier and Thompson created the Institute of Ethnic Affairs, a non-profit to search for solutions to problems between ethnic groups. The Institute published an opinion piece by Harold L. Ickes immediately after he retired as secretary of the Interior that argued, among other things, that the Navy should not be governing Guam and American Samoa. A string of publicity about Navy oppression of the CHamoru people resulted in the Guam Organic Act of 1950, granted the first measure of self-governance. As a result of Thompson's political activism on behalf of CHamoru self-government, the U.S. military, which controlled travel on and off of Guam, denied her permission to return for many years after the war.

After the Indian Education, Personality and Administration Project ended, Thompson was appointed to the Policy Board of the U.S. National Indian Institute in Washington, D.C., in 1948. Her marriage to Collier also ended. Like other female anthropologists who had worked outside academia, she was unable to secure a tenure-track position and took a series of one- and two-year teaching appointments. During the 1950s and 1960s, Thompson taught at the University of North Carolina, North Carolina State College, City College and Brooklyn College of City University of New York, Southern Illinois University, the University of California, Utah State University, Pennsylvania State University, San Francisco State University, and the University of Hawaii. She also held positions at the Bank Street College of Education in 1953 and the Merrill Palmer Skillman Institute at Wayne State University in 1954. At the same time, she was a consultant for a number of projects, including the Hutterite Socialization Project at Pennsylvania State University from 1962 to 1965 and the Centennial Joint School System Project in Pennsylvania from 1964 to 1966.

In her speech accepting the 1979 Bronislaw Malinowski Award from the Society for Applied Anthropology, Thompson highlighted how the first generation of applied anthropologists advised those trying to make colonialism more efficient, noting that these early anthropologists were "under a certain degree of pressure from the larger society to develop a set of tools for engineering, manipulating, and managing people in small groups and ethnic enclaves toward utilitarian goals superimposed from without."

After years of being unable to return to Guam, Thompson made her first return visit in 1977, when she was invited to be the keynote speaker for the CHamoru Studies Conference held at George Washington High School. She returned again in April 1987 to give the keynote speech, titled "Talking Stones," to the University of Guam's Annual College of Arts and Sciences Research Conference. In 1991, the Richard F. Taitano Micronesian Area Research Center (MARC) of the University of Guam hosted a reception at the Bishop Museum to honor Thompson on the publication of her autobiography, Beyond The Dream. Following her death on January 23, 2000, memorial services were held both in Honolulu and on Guam. Robert Underwood, the Delegate of Guam, entered an extended speech lauding Thompson as a "great anthropologist and true friend of Guam" into the Congressional Record from the House floor.

The Governor of Guam posthumously awarded her the Ancient Order of the Chamorri, the highest civilian honor given to a non-CHamoru person, for her profound contributions to Guam and its people.

== Personal life ==
In the mid-1930s, Thompson lived in Germany with her first husband, Bernhard Teuting. She studied rural ecology and religious change near Osnabrück, and briefly lived in Berlin while she worked on a project for the Ethnological Museum of Berlin. However, her husband physically abused her and she witnessed Adolf Hitler's consolidation of power under the Nazi Party. Leaving her husband, as well as most of her personal belonging and field notes, Thompson escaped back to Hawaii.

In 1943, Thompson married John Collier, the commissioner of the Bureau of Indian Affairs.

In 1963, Thompson married Sam Duker, a profession of education at Brooklyn College, whom she had known since they attended the Punahou School together. Following Duker's death in 1978, Thompson moved back to Hawaii. Thompson is survived by two nieces, a nephew, and a granddaughter.

== Selected bibliography ==
- Fijian Frontier. 1939.
- Guam and Its People. With a Village Journal by Jesus C. Barcinas. 1941.
- The Hopi Way. 1950.
- Culture in Crisis: A Study of the Hopi Indians. 1950.
- Toward A Science of Mankind. 1961.
- The Secret of Culture: Nine Community Studies. New York: Random House. 1969.
- "Talking Stones". Glimpses of Guam and Micronesia. 27 (4). December 1987.
- Beyond the Dream: A Search for Meaning. Guam: Micronesian Area Research Center, University of Guam. 1991. ISBN 9781878453051. (autobiography)
