= Lauriston Sharp =

American anthropologist (1907–1993)

- 1967 Fellow, John Simon Guggenheim Memorial Foundation
- Born: March 24, 1907; Madison, Wisconsin, U.S.
- Died: December 31, 1993 (aged 86); Ithaca, New York, U.S.
- Education: University of Wisconsin; Harvard University
- Known for: Applied Anthropology; Founded Cornell Southeast Asia Program; Founding member of the Society for Applied Anthropology
- Awards: Bronislaw Malinowski Award; Guggenheim Fellowship; Fulbright Fellowship; National Endowment for the Humanities Fellowship
- Scientific career
- Fields: Anthropology of Aboriginal Australia (ie Yir Yoront); Anthropology of South-East Asia (especially Bang Chan, Thailand)
- Workplaces: Cornell University; State Department, Division for Southeast Asian Affairs
- Notable students: G. William Skinner

Lauriston Sharp (March 24, 1907 – December 31, 1993) was a Goldwin Smith Professor of Anthropology and Asian Studies at Cornell University. He was the first person appointed in anthropology at the university, and he created its Southeast Asia Program, research centers in Asia and North and South America, a multidisciplinary faculty and strong language program. He was a founding member of the Society for Applied Anthropology and a founding trustee of the Asia Society.

== Early life and education ==
Sharp was born in 1907 in Madison, Wisconsin, where he grew up. His father was a professor of philosophy at the University of Wisconsin–Madison. Sharp attended this same institution, studying for a Bachelor of Arts (BA). While majoring in philosophy, Sharp went with friends Clyde Kluckhohn, James J. Hanks, Nelson Hagan, and William Gernon on summer treks to archaeological sites throughout the Southwestern states, including Arizona, Utah, and New Mexico. Specifically, they went in search for the Rainbow Bridge and Kaiparowits Plateau, both located in Southern Utah. These expeditions sparked his interest in the concrete, culturally informed anthropologist's perspective on human nature, in contrast to the more abstract, universalizing view of a philosopher.

After graduating with his BA in 1929, Sharp identified anthropology and Southeast Asian studies as his career focus. He encountered Berber culture while on an expedition to Algeria in 1930 with the Beloit-Logan Museum. Sharp moved to Austria to study Southeast Asian Ethnology under Robert Heine-Geldern, receiving the Certificate in Anthropology from the University of Vienna in 1931. He enrolled in the PhD program at Harvard University in 1932 and completed his thesis in 1937, after two years of fieldwork studying Australian Aborigines.

== Marriage and family ==
Sharp married Ruth Burdick, and they had a family. She contributed to the Bennington-Cornell Thailand Project with expertise in anthropology and ceramics. They had a son named Alexander and a daughter named Suki.

== Academic career ==
Professor Sharp began teaching at Cornell in 1936; he was the university's first appointment in anthropology. He remained devoted to Cornell, creating and directing programs, and teaching at and remaining connected with the university for 56 years. He remained active as the Goldwin Smith Professor Emeritus, even after his formal retirement in 1973.

During an appointment at the State Department in 1945 and 1946, Sharp was an assistant division chief for Southeast Asian affairs. Upon returning to Cornell, Sharp oversaw the expansion of the anthropology program, making it a leading center for graduate training and research. His vision of anthropology was to emphasize an applied orientation and focus on area studies. He established Cornell research centers in South and Southeast Asia and North and South America.

In 1947, Sharp began the Cornell-Thailand Project, a ground-breaking initiative to collate baseline data in a comprehensive study of a farming village (Bang Chan) on the outskirts of Bangkok. Sharp also founded and was the first director between 1950 and 1960 of Cornell's Southeast Asia Program, for which he recruited a multi-disciplinary faculty, developed a strong language program and started what become the foremost library resource on South East Asia.

Sharp provided for scholars from the areas studied to receive training in such programs, in addition to hundreds of Western scholars. He chaired the Cornell Faculty Committee, which in 1961 saw the creation of the university's Center for International Studies. Aside from realizing Sharp's longtime dream of Southeast Asian research, the Thailand project also marked the start of his collaboration with Lucien Hanks and Jane Hanks of Bennington College. This continued in the Bennington-Cornell Project started in 1963, which entailed a broad regional survey of the upland and lowland peoples of northern Thailand. His wife, Ruth Burdick Sharp, contributed her acquired expertise in anthropology and ceramics to this project.

Despite health problems which made field research difficult after retirement, Sharp maintained his activity at Cornell and abroad. He worked with his research documents on Thailand as well as on Australian Aborigines.

== Publications and organizations ==
Sharp's professional career spanned wide geographical areas. As a scholar-researcher, he studied indigenous cultures on four continents. Several of his publications became classics in their fields: Steel Axes for Stone-Age Australians (1952), People Without Politics (1958), and Cultural Continuities and Discontinuities in Southeast Asia (1962). A number of his coauthored works exhibited his multidisciplinary research and interest in culture change, such as Siamese Rice Village (1953) and Bang Chan: Social History of A Rural Community in Thailand (1978). Sharp had a reputation for passion in passing on his experiences to future generations.

Sharp was president of the Association for Asian Studies from 1961 to 1962. He was a founding member of the Society for Applied Anthropology and a founding trustee of the Asia Society. He served on the governing boards of the American Anthropological Association and the Siam Society.

He won Guggenheim, Fulbright, and National Endowment for the Humanities fellowships. Upon retiring, he was presented with a two-volume festschrift, one celebrating his contributions to studies of cultural change and applied anthropology, the other recognizing his contributions to Thai studies.

He died at the age of 86 at his Ithaca, New York home on December 31, 1993.

== Major works ==
- Steel Axes for Stone-Age Australians (1952)
- People Without Politics (1958)
- Cultural Continuities and Discontinuities in Southeast Asia (1962)

Co-authored:

- Siamese Rice Village (1953)
- Bang Chan: Social History of A Rural Community in Thailand (1978)

== Legacy and honors ==
- The Lauriston Sharp Prize is awarded each year to the graduate student who has contributed most outstandingly to both scholarship and the community life of the Cornell Southeast Asia Program.
- 1989, the Bronislaw Malinowski Award of the Society of Applied Anthropology.

== See also ==
- Bronislaw Malinowski Award
- Lauriston Sharp Prize

== Publications on-line ==
- Sharp, Lauriston (1952) Steel Axes for Stone-Age Australians
