= Jean Schensul =

American anthropologist

Jean J. Schensul is a medical anthropologist and senior scientist at The Institute for Community Research, in Hartford, Connecticut. Dr. Schensul is most notable for her research on HIV/AIDS prevention and other health-related research in the United States, as well as her extensive writing on ethnographic research methods. She has made notable contributions to the field of applied anthropology, with her work on structural interventions to health disparities leading to the development of new organizations, community research partnerships, and community/university associations. Schensul’s work has been dedicated to community-based research on topics such as senior health, education, and substance abuse, among others.

== Background ==
Schensul studied anthropology at the University of Manitoba (B.A., 1963), anthropology and linguistics at the University of Minnesota (M.A., 1967), and completed a PhD in cultural anthropology at the University of Minnesota in 1974.

From 1971 through 1974, Schensul was a research scientist at the Institute for Juvenile Research in Chicago, then between 1974–75 and 1977-79 was program evaluator for the Center for New Schools, also in Chicago. From 1975 until 1980, Schensul served as the director of Research in Action Inc., which operated in Connecticut and Florida. Schensul helped to create the research and training infrastructure at the Hispanic Health Council in Hartford, Connecticut, an organization she served as associate director for from 1978-1987. In 1987, she founded the Institute for Community Research, an independent research institute conducting prevention research in communities in the United States, India, Peru, Sri Lanka and China, where she has since served as executive director and currently senior scientist.

Dr. Schensul is also a research affiliate with the Yale Department of Psychology as well with the Center for Interdisciplinary Research on AIDS (CIRA).

== Scholarship ==
Schensul’s scholarly work has focused on studies of health inequalities, particularly those centering on HIV, substance use, mental health, and sexual risk, in multiethnic and multicultural urban areas within the United States as well as abroad. Her research with HIV and substance abuse has been funded by the National Institute on Aging (NIA), National Institute on Drug Abuse (NIDA), National Institute of Mental Health (NIMH), and National Institute on Alcohol Abuse and Alcoholism (NIAAA), with grants totaling over $35,000,000. Through her work with community-based approaches to service delivery and social change, Schensul is notable for her development and evaluation of multilevel interventions as well as her work on developing and furthering participatory research in the context of dynamic systems change theory. To date, Schensul has founded or cofounded four community-based health social science research institutes, including The Institute for Community Research and the Hispanic Health Council in the United States, the Instituto Nacional de Salud Comunitaria in Peru, and the Center for Intersectoral Community Health Studies in Sri Lanka. Dr. Schensul is also the co-author of The Ethnographer’s Toolkit, a seven book series that details ethnographic and qualitative research methods at every stage of the research process.

Her current research is an NIAAA-funded study of drinking and sexual risk among young men in Mumbai, India and a NIMH-funded study of women’s reproductive health and sexual risk in Mumbai.

== Recognition ==
- 1985 - President, Council on Anthropology and Education
- 1987 - Hispanic Health Council Service Award for research in Latino communities
- 1990 - Solon T. Kimball Biennial American Anthropology Association. Policy Research Award
- 1992 - San Juan Center/OPUS Community Service Award for research on aging in Latino communities
- 1995-1997 - President, Society for Applied Anthropology
- 1996 - Audrey Lorde Award for Scholar-Activist Collaboration in Women's Studies, Union Institute
- 2002 - Charter Oak Rice Heights Health Center 25th Anniversary Award for Community Service
- 2004 - Recognition from the State of Connecticut for accomplishments as a noted immigrant
- 2004 - Asian Family Services certificate of recognition for service to promote a multi-ethnic society
- 2009 - Mayor’s Award for Women contributing to the Welfare of Hartford
- 2010-13 - Elected Member, Executive Board, American Anthropological Association
- 2010 - Bronislaw Malinowski Career Award, Society for Applied Anthropology

== Publications ==
- 1976 Schensul, J. School, community and regional development in Mexico. Centros de Estudios Educativos. Mexico: D.F.
- 1978 Schensul, J. Ensenanza para el futuro y el futuro de la ensenanza. Coleccion Sep-Setentas, SEP. Mexico: D.F.
- 1978 Yoshida, B., Pelto, P. & Schensul, J. The principal and special education placement. The National Elementary Principal (8).
- 1978 Schensul, S. & Schensul, J. Advocacy and applied anthropology. In Social Scientists as Advocates: Views from the Applied Disciplines. G. Weber and G. McCall, eds. Beverly Hills, CA: Sage.
- 1980 Schensul, J. & Cerda, M. Parent involvement in bilingual education. ERIC publication
- 1981 Schensul, J. (ed.). Applied Anthropology in the Connecticut Region, Special Issue of Practicing Anthropology, Vol. 3(1).
- 1982 Schensul, S. & Schensul, J. Self-help groups and advocacy: a contrast in beliefs and strategies. In Beliefs and Self-Help: Cross Cultural Perspectives and Approaches. G. Weber and L. Cohen, eds. Science Press.
- 1982 Schensul, J. The interaction of theory, research and practice in applied educational anthropology. In The Generator (Newsletter of AERA Division G).
- 1982 Schensul, J. Issues in applied anthropology training programs. Practicing Anthropology, Vol. 4.
- 1982 Schensul, J. & Nieves, I. The crisis event in the Puerto Rican community. Urban Anthropology 11(1):101-128.
- 1982 Borrero, M., Schensul, J. & Garcia, R. Research, training and organizational change. Urban Anthropology 11(1):129-153. Published 1984.
- 1982 Schensul S. & Schensul, J. Helping resource use in a Puerto Rican community. Urban Anthropology 11(1):59-80.
- 1983 Schensul, J. President's report on reorganization. Anthropology and Education Quarterly
- 1985 Schensul, J. Cultural Transmission and Cultural Transformation: Educational anthropology in the Eighties. Anthropology and Education Quarterly (16(1):1-7.
- 1985 Schensul, J. Applying ethnography in educational change. Anthropology and Education Quarterly 16(2) 149-164.
- 1985 Schensul, J. & Eddy, E. M. (Eds.) Applying Educational Anthropology. Special Issue of the Anthropology and Education Quarterly. Vol. 16(2), Summer.
- 1985 Schensul, J. & Stern, G. (Eds.) Collaborative Research and Social Policy. Special issue of American Behavioral Scientist. Vol. 29(2). November/ December.
- 1985 Schensul, J. Introduction: Collaborative Research and Social Action. In special issue of American Behavioral Scientist, edited by Jean J. Schensul and Gwen Stern. Vol. 29(2): 131-133.
- 1985 Schensul, J. Systems consistency in research, policy formulation and social change. American Behavioral Scientist 29(2):186-204.
- 1985 Pelto, P. & Schensul, J. Theory and practice in policy research. In Applied Anthropology in America edited by E. Eddy and W. Partridge. NY: Columbia U. Press.
- 1985 Schensul, J. Urban women: migration, adaptation and nutritional status. Urban Nutrition in the Tropics edited by Reiner Gross and Noel Solomon, German Technical Agency, Rio de Janeiro, Brazil.
- 1987 Schensul, J. Urban Comadronas. In Collaborative Research and Social Policy: Anthropology in Action, edited by Donald Stull and Jean J. Schensul. Col: Westview Press.
- 1987 Schensul, J. Knowledge Utilization: An Anthropological Perspective. Practicing Anthropology, Vol. (4).
- 1987 Schensul, J. & Stull, D. Introduction: Collaborative Research and Social Policy. In Collaborative Research and Social Policy: Anthropology in Action, edited by Donald Stull and Jean J. Schensul. Col: Westview Press.
- 1988 Schensul, J. Community Based Long Term Care. Hartford, CT. Institute for Community Research Publication.
- 1988 Schensul, J., Singer, M., Burke, G., Torres, M. et al. AIDS Knowledge Attitudes and Behaviors Survey in a Multi-Ethnic Neighborhood of Hartford. AIDS Community Research Group. Institute for Community Research Publication.
- 1989 Schensul, J., Singer, M., Burke, G., Torres, M. et al. AIDS Knowledge Attitudes and Behaviors Survey in a Multi-Ethnic Neighborhood of Hartford. AIDS Community Research Group. Institute for Community Research Publication. Phase II.
- 1989 Wetle, Terrie & Schensul, J. Identifying Symptoms of Alzheimer's Disease among Elderly Puerto Ricans and their Family Caregivers. Newsletter of the University of Connecticut Travelers Center on Aging, Winter. NIDA/NADR and Principal Investigators. Risk Behaviors for HIV Transmission among Intravenous Drug Users not in Drug Treatment - United States, 1987-1989.
- 1990 Carroll, T. & Schensul, J. (eds). Cultural Diversity and the Future of Education: Visions of America, special issue of Education and Urban Society. Beverly Hills: SAGE. August. Schensul, J. Carroll, T. Visions of America in the 1990s and Beyond: Negotiating Cultural Diversity and Educational Change, in Cultural Diversity and the Future of Education: Visions of America, special issue of Education and Urban Society, edited by Thomas Carroll and Jean J. Schensul. Beverly Hills: SAGE.
- 1991 Morbidity and Mortality Weekly Report, 39(16):273-276. .
- 1991 Schensul, S. & Schensul, J. Ethnographic Evaluation of AIDS Programs in New Approaches to the Evaluation of AIDS programs. New Jersey: Jossey Bass.
- 1991 Schensul, J. & Weeks, M. Ethnographic Evaluation of AIDS Programs. NIDA NADR Proceedings DHHS: NIDA.
- 1991 Singer S, Irrizary R & Schensul J. Needle Access as an AIDS Prevention Strategy for IV Drug Users: A Research Perspective. J. Human Organization, 50(2):142-153.
- 1991 Reprinted in Caves R. Reading in the Urban Area: An Introduction. Newbury Park: Sage. Schensul, J. Organizing Cultural Diversity Through the Arts, in Cultural Diversity and the Future of Education: Visions of America, special issue of Education and Urban Society, edited by Thomas Carroll and Jean J. Schensul.Vol. 22(4):377-392. Beverly Hills: SAGE.
- 1991 McGraw S, Carillo E, Schensul J. Sociocultural Factors Associated with Smoking Behavior by Puerto Rican Adolescents in Boston.. Social Science and Medicine 33(12):1355-1364
- 1991 Schensul J. & Schensul, S. Collaborative Research, Chapter in Handbook on Qualitative Research Methods in Education, edited by Judith Goetz and Margaret LeCompte. NY: Academic Press
- 1991 M Singer, Z. Jia, M.Weeks & J. Schensul. IV Drug User Attitudes Toward Needle Exchange: Findings from the Hartford NADR Program.Research in Progress, NIDA
- 1992 Weeks, M. & Schensul, J. Ethnographic Research on AIDS Risk Behavior and the Making of Policy in Fetterman D (ed.) Speaking the Language of Power: Communication, Collaboration and Advocacy, London: Falmer Press.
- 1992 Singer, M., Jia, Schensul, J., Weeks, M., Page, B.. AIDS and the IV Drug User: the Local Context in Prevention Efforts. Medical Anthropology, Medical Anthropology 14(1):1- 22.
- 1992 Schensul J, Torres M and Wetle F.Innovative Methods of Disseminating Information on Alzheimer's Disease: The Puerto Rican Alzheimer's Education Project. 250 page bilingual manual for training service providers and families on identification, reporting and management of Alzheimer's Disease. Hartford: Institute for Community Research. Schensul, J. The Health of Older Puerto Ricans. Chapter in Issues and Solutions: Aging in the Latino Context edited by Sotomayor M (ed.). Catholic University Press
- 1992 Schensul, J. Recommendations to the NIH Submitted on Behalf of the Society for Medical Anthropology. Comments presented at a regional meeting of the National Institutes of Health, April, 1992, University of Connecticut School of Medicine, American Anthropological Association Newsletter, September issue, 1992.
- 1992 Berg, M. and Schensul, J. The Socioeconomic Status of Black Hartford. Chapter in The State of Black Hartford, edited by Stanley Battle. Hartford: Urban League of Greater Hartford.
- 1992 Schensul, J. Approaches to Case Management in Puerto Rican Communities. Jr. of Case Management, December, 1992.
- 1994 Schensul, J. Visions of America in the 1990s and Beyond: Negotiating Cultural Diversity and Educational Change. In Readings in the Urban Arena: An Introduction, edited by Roger Caves. Thousand Oaks, CA: SAGE.
- 1994 Schensul SL, Schensul J J, Oodit G, Bhowon U, Ragobur R Negotiating Sexual Intimacy in the Era of AIDS: Young Women Workers and their sex partners in Mauritius., in Reproductive Health Matters, May;(3):83-92.
- 1994 Schensul S, Oodit G, Schensul J, Bhowon U & Ragobar S.Women, Work and AIDS in Mauritius. Monograph #2, Women and AIDS series. Washington DC: Inter-national Center for Research on Women.
- 1994 Schensul, J. Comments on Ethnicity, Culture and "Cultural Competence", in Building Bridges: Creating and sustaining Viable Multicultural Communities. Washington, DC: The Hitachi Foundation.
- 1994 Schensul J & Bishop B Ethics, Ethnicity and Health Care Reform, in It Just Ain't Fair: The Ethics of Health Care for African Americans eds. Dulla A & Goering S. Westport CT: Praeger.
- 1995 Weeks, M., Schensul J. et al. AIDS Prevention for African American and Latina Women: Building Culturally and Gender Appropriate Intervention. AIDS Education and Prevention.
- 1995 Schensul J & Foss A The Ethics of Access to Health Care under Managed Care, in Ethics in Applied Anthropology, edited by Neil Tashima. American Anthropological Association: NAPA Bulletin, Washington DC: AAA Press.
- 1995 Bernal, H., S. Wooley, et al. (1997). "The Challenge of Using Likert-Type Scales WithLow-Literate Ethnic Populations." Nursing Research 46(3): 179-181.
- 1996 Weeks, M.R., Singer, M., Grier M., & Schensul, J. Gender Relations, Sexuality and AIDS Risk Among African American and Latina Women, edited by Sargent C and Brettell C. NY: Prentice Hall.
- 1998 Schensul, J. Learning about sexual decision-making from Urban Youth. International Quarterly of Community Health Education, in Cross Cultural Perspectives of Women’s Sexual Decision making: Implications for sexual health protection at the community level, edited by M.I. Torres & M. Weeks Vol. 18(1):29-48, 1998–99
- 1998 Schensul, J. Community Based Risk Prevention with Urban Youth, School Psychology Review, Special issue on Mental Health Programming in Schools and Communities, ed. Nastasi B., Vol 27(2): 233-246.
- 1998 Nastasi, B. K., Schensul, J., deSilva, M.W.A, Varjas, K., Silva, K. T., Ratnayake, P., & Schensul, S. L. (1998–99). Community-based sexual risk prevention program for Sri Lankan youth: Influencing sexual-risk decision making. International Quarterly of Community Health Education, 18 (1), 139-155. 1998-99.
- 1998 Trotter, R. & Schensul, J. Applied Ethnographic Research Methods, chapter in Handbook of Ethnographic Methods, edited by HR Bernard. CA: Altamira Press.
- 1999 Schensul J. & LeCompte M. The Ethnographer’s Toolkit. Seven Oaks Innovation. CA: Altamira Press, 7 volumes. Book (190 - 250 pages each): Introduction to Ethnographic Research Methods (1); Essential Ethnographic Methods (2); Enhanced Ethnographic Methods (3); Researching Social Networks, Spatial Data and Hidden Populations (4); Analysis and Interpretation of Ethnographic Data (Book 5); Researcher’s Role and Research Partnerships (Book 6); Disseminating Ethnographic Data (7).
- 1999 Schensul, J. J. (1999). Organizing Community Research Partnerships in the Struggle Against AIDS. Health Education & Behavior, 26(2), 266-283.
- 2000 Schensul, J., Huebner, C., Singer, M., Snow, M. Feliciano, P., Broomhall, L. The High, The Money and The Fame: Smoking Bud Among Urban Youth. Medical Anthropology, Vol. 18:389-414.
- 2000 Bernal, H., Woolley, S., Schensul, J. & Dickinson, J.K. Correlates of Self-Efficacy in Diabetes Self-Care Among Hispanic Adults With Diabetes." The Diabetes Educator 26(4): 673-680.
- 2001 Nastasi, B. K., Varjas, K., Schensul, S. L., Silva, K. T., Schensul, J. J., Ratnayake, P. The Participatory Intervention Model: A framework for conceptualizing and promoting intervention acceptability. School Psychology Quarterly, 15, 207-232.
- 2002 Weeks, M. Clair, S., Schensul, J. et al. High-Risk drug use sites, meaning and practice: Implications for AIDS prevention.Journal of Drug Issues Vol. 31(1):781-808.
- 2002 Weeks, M.R., Clair, S., Borgatti, S.P., Radda, K. & Schensul, J.J. Social networks of drug users in high risk sites: Finding the connections. AIDS and Behavior, 6, 193-206.
- 2002 Schensul, J. & Berg, M. Theories Guiding Outcomes for Action Research for Service Learning, chapter in Service Learning Research, Volume 1: The Essence of the Pedagogy, edited by Andrew Furco and Shelley Billig. NY: Information Age Publishers.
- 2002 Schensul J. et al. Ethnicity, social networks and HIV Risk in older drug users, Advances in Medical sociology Volume 8: Social Networks and Health. Bernice Pescoslido and Judith A. Levy, London: Oxford press.
- 2002 Schensul, J. Democratizing Science through Research Partnerships, Bulletin of Science, Technology & Society, Vol. 22 (3) p190-203.
- 2002 Berg, M. J., Owens, D. C., & Schensul, J. J. (2002). Participatory Action Research, Service-Learning, and Community Youth Development. CYD Journal: Community Youth Development, 3(2), 20-25.
- 2002 Schensul, J. Key Informants. Encyclopedia of Health and Behavior. Sage Publications.
- 2003 Schensul J., Levy J, & Disch W. Individual, Contextual, and Social Network Factors Affecting Exposure to HIV/AIDS Risk among Older Adults in Low-Income Senior Housing Complexes. Journal of Acquired Immune Deficiency Syndromes: Volume 33, S2, Pp S138-S152.
- 2003 Liao, S, Schensul J & Wolffers I. Sex-related health risks and implications for interventions with Hospitality Women in Hainan, China. AIDS Education and Prevention, Vol. 15 (2): 109-122.
- 2003 Radda, K. E., Schensul, J, Disch, W. B., Ward, E., Levy, J. A., & Reyes, C. Y. Assessing Human Immunodeficiency Virus (HIV) Risk among Older Urban Adults. Family and Community Health, 26(3), 203-213.
- 2003 Singer, M., Clair, S., Schensul, J., Huebner, C., Eiserman, J., Pino, R., Garcia, J Dust in the wind: the growing use of embalming fluid among youth in Hartford, Ct., Substance Use and Misuse, Vol. 40 (8): 1035-1050.
- 2004 Nastasi BK, Schensul, JJ, Balkcom, CT & Cintron-Moscoso F. Integrating Research and Practice to Facilitate Implementation Across Multiple Contexts: Illustration from an Urban Middle School Drug and Sexual Risk Prevention Program in Advances in School-Based Mental Health: Best Practices and Program Models, edited by Kris Robinson, Chapter 13, pp. 1–22.
- 2004 Schensul, J. & Berg, M. Youth Participatory Action Research: A Transformative Approach To Service Learning. In special issue of Michigan Journal of Community Service Learning on anthropology and service learning, edited by J. Howard, and A. Keene, Vol., 10(3):76-88.
- 2004 Berg, M. & Schensul, J. (eds.) Youth-led Participatory Action Research for Social Change. Practicing Anthropology, January issue, Vol. 26(2).
- 2004 Schensul, J. & Berg, M. Introduction: Research with Youth. Practicing Anthropology, Vol. 26(2) : 2 – 5.
- 2004 Schensul, J. & Berg, M.J., Schensul, D. & Sydlo, S. Core Elements of Participatory Action Research for Educational Empowerment and Risk Prevention with Urban Youth, Practicing Anthropology, 26(2): 5 – 9.
- 2004 Schensul, J. PCP Abuse in Hartford, Connecticut. In Epidemiologic TRENDS IN DRUG ABUSE –THE PCP Panel Summary of paper presented at CEWG Meeting, December, 2003, published in CEWG summary, Dec. 2003.
- 2004 Schensul, J., Burkholder, G. & Pino, R. Tracking the Presence of "Dust" in Connecticut. Paper included in CEWG Proceedings, spring, 2004.
- 2004 Ward, E., Disch, W. B., Levy, J. & Schensul, J. Perception of HIV/AIDS Risk Among Urban, Low-Income Senior Housing Residents. AIDS Education and Prevention, Vol. 16(6): 571- 588.
- 2004 Morgan, D., Pacheco, V., Rodriguez, C., Vazquez, E., Berg, M., Schensul, J. Youth Participatory Action Research on Hustling and its Consequences: A Report from the Field. Children, Youth and Environments 14(3):202-228.
- 2005 Schensul, J., Nastasi, B., De Moura Castro, H. Drug use, Dependence, and New Drug 18 Trends in middle school youth. Encyclopedia School Psychology, edited by Steven W. Lee, Editor in Chief, Sage Publications.
- 2005 Schensul, J. Strengthening Communities Through Research Partnerships for Social Change: The ICR Perspective. in volume edited by Hyland, L. & Bennett, L. Community Building in the 21st Century, School for American Research (SAR) Press, pp. 191–218.
- 2005 Eiserman, J., Diamond, S. & Schensul, J.J. Rollin’ on E: A qualitative analysis of ecstasy use among inner city adolescents and young adults. Jr. of Ethnicity in SubstanceAbuse Vol. 4 (2): 9-38
- 2005 Schensul, J.J., Diamond, S. Disch, W., Pino, R. Bermudez, R., Eiserman, J. The Diffusion of Ecstasy through urban youth networks. Journal of Ethnicity in Substance Abuse, Vol. 4(2): 39-71.
- 2005 Schensul, J. J. & Burkholder, G. Vulnerability, Social Networks, Sites and Selling as Predictors of Drug Use among Urban African American and Puerto Rican Emerging Adults. Journal of Drug Issues. Martin, S. & White, H. (eds.). Vol. 35(2): 379-407.
- 2005 Schensul, J. Sustainability in HIV prevention research, in Context, Culture and Collaboration in AIDS Intervention: Ecological Ideas for Enhancing Community Impact.Trickett, E. & Pequenot, W. Oxford U. Press, pp. 176–195.
- 2005 Schensul, J. Convey, M., Burkholder, G., Pino, R. Challenges in measuring concurrency, agency and intentionality in polydrug research. Addictive Behaviors, Vol.30 (3): 571-574.
- 2005 Schensul J.J., Robison, J., Reyes, C., Radda, K., Gaztambide, S., Disch, W. Building interdisciplinary/intersectoral research partnerships for community-based mental health research with older minority adults. American Journal of Community Psychology, 38(1- 2), 79-93.
- 2006 Diamond, S., Bermudez, R. & Schensul, J. What’s the rap about ecstasy?: Popular music lyrics and drug trends among American youth. Jr. of Adolescent Research Vol. 2(1); 369-298.
- 2006 Schensul, J. Life at the Crossroads. In Making History At The Frontier: Women Creating Careers As Practicing Anthropologists, edited by Christina Wasson. NAPA Bulletin, Volume 26, 163-190.
- 2006 Schensul, J., Robison, J.. Radda. K., Gaztambide, S., & Reyes, C. Interdisciplinary Research Partnerships for the Promotion of Mental Health among Older Adults. Jr. of Community Psychology Vol. 38 Issue 1/2,: 79-93,
- 2006 Disch, W. B., Schensul, J. J., Radda, K. E., & Robison, J. T. Perceived environmental stress, depression, and quality of life in older, low income, minority urban adults, in H. Mollenkopf & A. Walker (Eds.), Quality of life in old age: International and multidisciplinary perspectives. The Netherlands: Kluwer Academic Publishers.
- 2007 Schensul, J. Method. In Encyclopedia of Qualitative Research Methods, Thousand Oaks, CA: Sage Publications.
- 2007 Schensul, J. Methodology. In Encyclopedia of Qualitative Research Methods. Sage Publications, Thousand Oaks, CA.
- 2007 Schensul, J. Documents. In Encyclopedia of Qualitative Research Methods. Thousand Oaks, CA: Sage Publications
- 2007 Schensul, J. Historical Context. In Encyclopedia of Qualitative Research Methods Thousand Oaks, CA.: Sage Publications,.
- 2008 Schensul, J. & Berg, M. Reframing Hegemonies: Co-constructing transformational knowledge and action through Participatory Ethnographic Action Research Partnerships. Collaborative Anthropologies, Annual. Inaugural issue, U. Nebraska Press.
- 2008 Brydon-Miller, M, Davids, I. Jaiti, N. Brinton L., Schensul, J. & Williams, S. Popular Education and Action Research: Voices from the Field. In Sage Handbook on Educational Action Research, Noffke, S., & B. Somekh (eds). Thousand Oaks: Sage Publications
- 2008 Burkholder, G. & Schensul, J. Risk and Protective Factors For Drug Use Among Polydrug-Using Urban Youth and Young Adults. Journal of Social, Behavioral, and Health Sciences, Vol 1 (1), December. http://www.jsbhs.org/9049.htm Archived 2012-07-23 at the Wayback Machine..
- 2009 Schensul J. & E. Trickett (Eds.). Introduction to Multi-Level Community Based Culturally Situated Interventions, in AJCP, Vol, 43:232–240
- 2009 Schensul, J. Community, Culture and Sustainability in Multilevel Dynamic Systems Intervention Science, American Journal of Community Psychology, Vol. 43(3/4), 241-256. 2009 Schensul, J., Radda, Kim, Coman, E., & Vazquez, E. Multi-Level Intervention to Prevent Influenza Infection in Older Minority Adults, American Journal of Community Psychology, Vol. 43(3/4): 313 -329.
- 2009 Berg, M., Coman, E., Schensul, J. Youth Action Research for Prevention: A Multi-levelIntervention Designed to Increase Efficacy and Empowerment Among Urban Youth. American Journal of Community Psychology, Vol 43(4): 345-359.
- 2009 Trickett, E., & Schensul, J. Summary Comments: Multi-Level Community Based Culturally Situated Interventions, Vol. 43(4):377-381.
- 2010 Ward, E Disch, W. Schensul, J. & Levy, J. Understanding Low-Income, Minority Older Adult Self-Perceptions of HIV Risk. Journal of the Association of Nurses in AIDS Care, on line, 2010, and in press for 2011.
- 2010 Schensul, J., Gupta, K., Singh, S.K., Bryant, K., Verma, R. (Eds). Current Issues in Alcohol Use and HIV Research and Prevention in India AIDS and Behavior, Vol. 14, S1, June, 2010,
- 2010 Cromley, E., Schensul, J. Singh, S.K., Berg, M.J., Coman, E. Spatial Dimensions of Research on Alcohol and Sexual Risk: A Case Example from a Mumbai Study, AIDS and Behavior, Vol. 14, S. 1:104-112. DOI 10.1007/s10461-010-9733-9
- 2010 Schensul, J., Chandran, D., Singh, S.K., Singh, S., Gupta, K. The Use of Qualitative Comparative Analysis for Critical Event Research in Alcohol and HIV in Mumbai, India, AIDS and Behavior, Vol. 14, S1:113 – 125. DOI 10.1007/s10461-010-9736-6
- 2010 Berg, M.J., Kremelberg, D., Dwivedi, P., Verma, S., Schensul, J. Gupta, K., Chandran, D. and Singh, S.K. The Effects of Husband’s Alcohol Consumption on Married Women in Three Low-Income Areas of Greater Mumbai AIDS and Behavior, Vol. 14, S1, S126-135. DOI 10.1007/s10461-010-9735-7
- 2010 Singh, S.K., Schensul, J., Gupta, K., Maharana, B., Kremelberg, D., Berg, M.Determinants of Alcohol Use, Risky Sexual Behavior and Sexual Health Problems Among Men in Low Income Communities of Mumbai, India. AIDS Behav (2010) 14:S48–S60, DOI 10.1007/s10461-010-9732-x
- 2010 LeCompte, M.D. and Schensul, J., Designing and Conducting Ethnographic Research.The Ethnographer’s Toolkit, Book 1. Lanham, MD: AltaMira Press, Rowman and Littlefield.
- 2010 Schensul, J. Engaged Universities, Community Based Research Organizations and Third Sector Science in a Global System, Human Organization, Vol. 69(4): 308 – 320.
- 2011 Schensul, J. Building an Applied Educational Anthropology beyond the Academy. In Levinson, B.A.U. and Pollock, M. (eds). A Blackwell Companion to the Anthropology of Education. Boston, MA: Wiley-Blackwell, pp. 112–134.
- 2011 Singer, E. & Schensul, J.J. 2011. Negotiating Ecstasy Risk, Reward and Control: A qualitative analysis of drug management patterns among Ecstasy-using urban young adults. Substance Use and Misuse, Vol. 47:1675-1689.
- 2011 Schensul J. & Odell-Butler, M. Toward a Practice-based Ethnography in the Global Village in Applying Anthropology in the Global Village, edited by Wasson, C., Butler, M.O. and Copeland-Carson, J. CA: Leftcoast Press, pp. 285–300.
- 2011 Trickett, E.J., Beehler, S., Deutsch, C. Green, L., Hawe, Pl, McLeroy, K., Miller R.L., Rapkin, B.D., Schensul, Jean J., Schultz, A.M., Trimble, J.E. Advancing the Science of Community-Level Interventions, AJPH, Vol. 101(8): 1410-1419.
- 2011 Moonzwe, L., Schensul, J.J., & Kostick, K. The Role of MDMA (Ecstasy) in Coping with Negative Life Situations Among Urban Young Adults Jr. of Psychoactive drugs, Vol. 42(3):199–210. .
- 2011 Diamond, S., Snyder, L., Schensul, J. Preventing Substance Use among Multi-Ethnic Urban Teens Using Education Entertainment, Social Marketing and Peer Content, in edited volume by Barry Krebs on edutainment.
- 2012 Schensul, J.J., Coleman, C., Diamond, S., Pino, R, Bermudez, A.R., Velazco, O., Blake, R., Bessette, N. "Rollin’ n Dustin’": Using Installation and Film for Interactive Dissemination of Drug Study Results to Youth in Participant Communities, in Popularizing Research: Engaging New Genres, Media, and Audiences, Edited by Philip Vannini, NY: Peter Lang Publishing, pp. 161-188.
- 2012 Schensul, J.J., Nair, S., Bilgi, S., Cromley, E. Kadam, V., D"Mello, S., Donta, B. Availability, accessibility and promotion of smokeless tobacco in a low-income area of Mumbai, Tobacco Control online, 10.1136/tobaccocontrol-2011-050148, pp. 1 – 7.
- 2012 Schensul, J., Berg, M. & Nair, S. Using Ethnography in Participatory Community Assessment. Chapter in Methods for Conducting Community-Based Participatory Research for Health. Edited by Israel, B., Eng, J., Parker, E. Schultz, A. NY: Jossey Bass in press.
- 2012 Coman, E., Iordache, E., Schensul, J., & Coiculescu, I. Comparisons of CES-D depression scoring methods in two older adults ethnic groups. The emergence of an ethnic-specific brief three-item CES-D scale. International Journal of Geriatric Psychiatry. http://onlinelibrary.wiley.com/doi/10.1002/gps.3842/full.
- 2012 Black, A., K. Serowik, Schensul, J. et al. "Build a Better Mouse: Directly-Observed Issues in Computer Use for Adults with SMI." Psychiatric Quarterly: 1-12.
- 2012 Schensul, J. & M. D. LeCompte (Eds.). The Ethnographer’s Toolkit 2nd Edition. R & L: Altamira Press.
- 2012 Schensul, S., Schensul J and M.D. LeCompte. Initiating Ethnographic Research: Models, Methods, And Measurement; A Mixed Methods approach, Book 2, Ethnographer’s Toolkit, Lanham, MD.: AltaMira Press
- 2012 Schensul J. and M.D. LeCompte. Essential Data Collection Methods; a Mixed Methods approach, Book 3, Ethnographer’s Toolkit, Lanham, MD. : AltaMira Press.
- 2012 Schensul, J. and M.D. LeCompte (eds). Specialized Ethnographic Methods; A mixed methods approach, Book 4, Ethnographer’s Toolkit, Lanham, MD. : AltaMira Press.
- 2012 LeCompte, M.D. & J. Schensul. Analysis and Interpretation of Ethnographic Qualitative and Survey Data; A mixed methods approach. Book 5, Ethnographer’s Toolkit. Lanham, MD: AltaMira Press.
- 2012 Schensul, J. Building a Systems Dynamic Model of Smokeless Tobacco Use in Mumbai. Practicing Anthropology fall issue, in press.
- 2012 Nair, S., Schensul, J.J., Bilgi, S., Kadam, V., D’Mello, S., Donta, B. Effects of Gutkha Control on Tobacco accessibility, availability, social norms and use in a low income area of Mumbai. Indian Journal of Cancer. December, 2012 (under review).
- 2013 Schensul, J.J. Youth Participatory Action Research. Chapter in Encyclopedia of Action Research, edited by Brydon-Miller, M. Commissioned, in process.
- 2013 Trotter, R., Schensul, J. & Kostick, K. Applied Research Methods, in Bernard, H.R. and Gravlee, L. Research Methods in Anthropology, 2nd edition, in press.
- 2013 Schensul, S., Schensul, J., Weeks, M. Singer, M. CBPR/PAR in anthropology in Bernard, H.R. and Gravlee, L. Research Methods in Anthropology, 2nd edition, in press.
- 2013 Schensul, J.J. Community-based Research Organizations: Co-constructing public knowledge and bridging knowledge/action communities through Participatory Action Research in Public Anthropology in a Borderless World, Beck, S. & Maida, C. A. (eds). Los Angeles, CA: U of California Press, in press.
