= Spero Manson =

Spero M. Manson (born May 2, 1950) is a professor of public health and psychiatry at the Colorado School of Public Health's University of Colorado Anschutz Medical Campus. He also holds the Colorado Trust Chair in American Indian Health and has served as the director of the Centers for American Indian and Alaska Native Health and the Associate Dean of Research at Anschutz.

Manson has published 200 articles on mental health and addiction in Native populations. He was elected to the Institute of Medicine in 2002, and has received numerous awards including the 1998 Rema Lapouse Award from the American Public Health Association, the 2019 Bronislaw Malinowski Award from the Society for Applied Anthropology, the Sarnat Prize from the National Academy of Medicine. Dr. Manson also serves on the Advisory Committee to the Director of the Centers for Disease Control and Prevention (CDC)

He is a member of the Little Shell Tribe of Chippewa Indians of Montana and is married to University of Washington Retired Professor Dedra Buchwald.
