= City Landscape =

Paintings by Joan Mitchell

- Art Institute of Chicago
- Artist: Joan Mitchell
- Year: 1955
- Medium: Oil on linen
- Dimensions: 203.2 cm × 203.2 cm (80 in × 80 in)
- Location: Art Institute of Chicago, Chicago
- Accession: 1958.193
- Website: www.artic.edu/artworks/86385/city-landscape

City Landscape is the title given to a series of several abstract expressionist oil paintings by 20th-century American painter Joan Mitchell. Art critics have described the abstract works in the series as cityscapes, with their colorful, central elements each resembling a grid found in urban planning. The central density of painting techniques and the outer spaces are both widely critiqued.

The most prominent version is held by the Art Institute of Chicago and has been frequently lent out on exhibition for retrospectives of her work. This is a work that is associated with Mitchell as an exemplar of her work. Mitchell produced many artworks of a similar style during the mid-1950s. Rockefeller University sold one work in the series in 2024, receiving just over $17 million for it at auction after deciding to list it to fund scientific research. Both well-known versions were painted in 1955 and acquired from the Stable Gallery in 1958 after limited exhibition exposure.

== Background ==
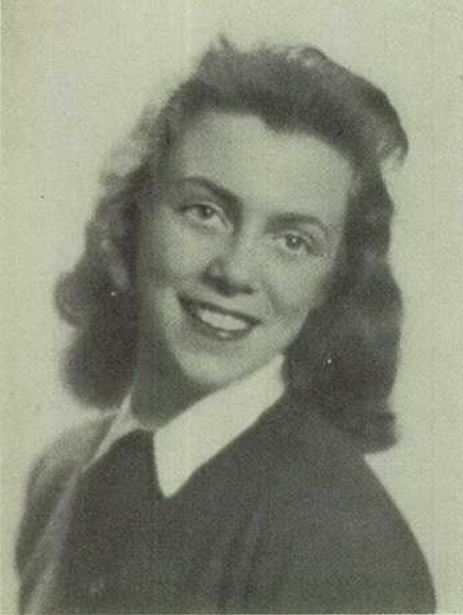
Joan Mitchell, c. 1942

Mitchell was born and raised in Chicago and graduated from the School of the Art Institute of Chicago before settling in New York City. Mitchell and her mother are referred to as heiresses. At the 1950 Whitney Museum Annual, Mitchell saw her first Willem de Kooning. Mitchell became a part of the abstract expressionism movement and pursued art with emotion-filled coloration.

Mitchell's style of abstract expressionism differed from her peers in several ways. Clement Greenberg, for example, argued that abstract expressionism, unlike traditional art, should avoid a dominant focal point. This compelled Mitchell to produce works featuring central visual elements. Unlike some of her abstract expressionist contemporaries who were action painters that worked fast and spontaneously with their paint, Mitchell painted at a gradual pace with intent. "I paint a little", she stated. "Then I sit and I look at the painting, sometimes for hours. Eventually the painting tells me what to do." In October 1957, in the first major feature on Mitchell's work that appeared in ARTnews, Irving Sandler noted that Mitchell rarely made alterations to her works (preferring to only add paint to her canvases or scrap them and restart), while her peers would often modify their work.

In the 1950s, the art world was dominated by white men. Mitchell is regarded as among the greatest abstract expressionist painters along with Jackson Pollock, Franz Kline, and Willem de Kooning. She was among the few women artists of her generation to achieve acclaim. Mitchell's career took off in the 1950s and she began to have both group and solo shows at the Stable Gallery in 1953. Between 1953 and 1965, she had 7 solo shows there.

== Series ==
Mitchell painted multiple works titled City Landscapes. Two of these are identified with reference to their original longtime owners, under the names "Chicago version" and "Rockefeller version".

Three City Landscape-titled works were presented in Mitchell's earliest (1955) solo gallery shows at the Stable gallery. Their March presentation at a solo Mitchell received a description of the works as "huge sprawling city-scapes seen from vast distances" from A. Newbill in Arts Digest and were praised by D. Seckler in ArtNews as exhibiting a "new range of color intensity". They appeared together again in subsequent 1955 group exhibitions at Stable Gallery and regardless of which color is dominant in any specific work, they were jointly regarded for the "mass and tangle" of their central elements and are considered to be "representational and also abstract".

During the 1998 exhibition entitled Joan Mitchell: Paintings from the Fifties, an artwork titled "Untitled, 1954-55" was included. When this work reappeared in a 2011 exhibition entitled Joan Mitchell: Paintings from the Fifties it was regarded as "a companion, perhaps predecessor" to the AIC version. Confirmation that Mitchell titled several 1950s works City Landscape came from the San Francisco Museum of Modern Art in 2021 when the Chicago version toured on exhibition.

== Chicago version ==
One version of City Landscape is a 1955 80 in × 80 in (203.2 cm × 203.2 cm) oil on linen work. That work was first exhibited at a museum by the Walker Art Center from October 23 to December 5, 1955. The Art Institute acquired it in 1958 from the Stable Gallery. The Art Institute included it in four of their own exhibitions between 1958 and 1968. Then, it exhibited at in a 1988–1989 retrospective tour of Corcoran Gallery of Art, San Francisco Museum of Modern Art, Albright-Knox Art Gallery, La Jolla Museum of Contemporary Art, and Herbert F. Johnson Museum of Art

When Kyle Morris curated the 1955 Walker Art Center exhibition, he put together young artists who were challenging the standard perceptions of art. He felt that although the viewer infers landscape qualities from her work, a landscape is not actually depicted. Morris felt that the works in the exhibition redirected the pursuit of object identification to appreciation of artistic expression in physical form. The documentation of the exhibition seems to present the Rockefeller version, although the Chicago version is supposedly the version that was exhibited.

City Landscape exhibited 2002–2004 retrospective tour of Whitney Museum of American Art, Birmingham Museum of Art, and Modern Art Museum of Fort Worth. This tour, entitled The Paintings of Joan Mitchell, was a retrospective survey. The tour was scheduled to continue at The Phillips Collection from February 14 to May 16, 2004. When the final tour stop was changed to the Des Moines Art Center, January 31 to April 25, 2004, City Landscape was not included.

It also exhibited with 2021–2023 COVID-19 pandemic-delayed stops at San Francisco Museum of Modern Art, Baltimore Museum of Art, and Fondation Louis Vuiton. It Solomon R. Guggenheim Museum stop was cancelled. This work was also regarded as a retrospective.

City Landscape is praised for the orchestration of "ragged swipes of hot pink and red with licks of blue, green, ocher, and black" and "the complex ways she built up layers of marks, dripping lines, and vast swatches of color to create a vibrant interwoven visual space". The work is considered to be landscape-derived meandering work with a "hovering central mass" that is compared stylistically to Hudson River Day Line (1955). In a review of her 59-piece 2002 Whitney Exhibition and its published catalog, entitled The Paintings of Joan Mitchell, Joan Marter notes that the "fundamental centripetalism" of these two specific artworks presented an early sign that even as an abstract expressionist painter, Mitchell used Figure–ground convention in order for "the sides and edges of the canvas to support internal activity as though acting like sky around clouds." According to James Cuno, the bundle of pink, scarlet, mustard, sienna and black central pigments represents the pathways of a city. Smithsonian writer Nora McGreevy noted that "The painting's grid-like structure and dense, frantic explosion of color are suggestive of an urban environment."

This is a work often associated with Mitchell. When Margaret Randall reviewed "Ninth Street Women: Lee Krasner, Elaine de Kooning, Grace Hartigan, Joan Mitchell, and Helen Frankenthaler: Five Painters and the Movement That Changed Modern Art" for The Women's Review of Books, City Landscape was the work that they chose to represent Mitchell as the example of her work. This version was included in Cuno's book, Master Paintings: In the Art Institute of Chicago. McGreevy described the work as a standout among the 80 works included in the post-Pandemic tour.

At the Art Institute of Chicago, the work is considered one of the most important pieces in the collection, and it is presented prominently throughout the museum's digital and print resources. The museum included a video about it as an element of its "Essentials Tour". They also included it as part of various highlights listings. The museum also had various styles of educational materials dedicated to this specific work.

== Rockefeller version ==
The Rockefeller University version of City Landscape

Mitchell produced a 64.5 in × 73.5 in (163.8 cm × 186.7 cm) oil on canvas City Landscape in 1955 that exhibited in Carnegie Institute, October-December 1955. Then it exhibited at North Carolina Museum of Art March-April 1957. Rockefeller University acquired it in 1958 at the Stable Gallery. Rather than use pale shades of gray that she had been using in the prior years, this work used cobalt blue, scarlet red, teal, turquoise, and black for the central element. After being exhibited in 1955 and 1957, and then acquired in 1958, the work never left campus. City Landscape hung for a long time in the Abby Aldrich Rockefeller Dining Room next to Franz Kline's Luzerne where it had been inaccessible to almost anyone but campus staff, visitors, and leading scientists. Rockefeller had been a founder of the Museum of Modern Art (MOMA) and the works in Rockefeller Hall had all been American contemporary art paintings selected by the MOMA inner circle in her memory. Before auction, the work had hung in Theobald Smith Hall.

By the mid 2010s, Mitchell's paintings began to sell at auctions and art fairs for very high prices. In 2014, a Mitchell painting sold for $11.9 million ($16.2 million in 2025), to establish a female artist record auction price. In a 2018 Christie's New York auction, the Mitchell auction record hit $16.9 million ($21.7 million in 2025). In May 2021, a Mitchell record $20 million ($23.8 million in 2025) was achieved at Art Basel Hong Kong. In 2023, Mitchell's first two $20 million auction results were attained at Christie's for $29.16 million ($30.8 million in 2025) and at Sotheby's for $27.9 million ($29.5 million in 2025). There was a May 2024 $22.6 million at Sotheby's auction, which was followed by a June 2024 Art Basel $18–$20 million range sale.

Although Rockefeller University had a $2.5 billion endowment and a recently completed $777 million funding campaign, the benefits of the monetary value of the painting outweighed its value as a rarely seen painting. The Rockefeller University is a very prestigious biomedical research center whose professors consistently perform leading edge research against diseases that has been recognized with the Nobel Prize in Chemistry, the Nobel Prize in Physiology or Medicine, Lasker Awards (considered the American Nobel), and the National Medal of Science. In 1977, when the University sold Jacques-Louis David's painting Portrait of Antoine and Marie-Anne Lavoisier (1788) for $4 million ($21.3 million in 2025) to Charles Wrightsman, who later donated it to the Metropolitan Museum of Art, the proceeds funded two professorships and four graduate fellowships. The first two professorship recipients were Maclyn McCarty and Norton Zinder. Rockefeller President Richard P. Lifton noted that the University is "not a museum", that Mitchell paintings had "dramatically increased in value in recent years" and that University had interest in funding "artificial intelligence and neurodegeneration" research. City Landscape was estimated to sell in the $15 million to $20 million range and eventually sold for $17,085,000 at Christies on November 19, 2024. Rockefeller also sold a second Joan Mitchell in that auction (Untitled, 1955) for $9,380,000. Jointly, the two works had been expected to sell for up to a combined $32 million.

=== Reviews ===
A 1959 review in the Rockefeller Institute Quarterly was confident that the name aptly recalled her memories, but speculated on whether their "mosaic" presentation depicted her native Chicago or her residential location of New York City. A 1955 passing mention of this work in a discussion of the 1955 Carnegie International described it as a "bravura equivalent of a grand landscape" that was a shaped by the new trends in abstract painting.

== Notes ==
=== Book sources ===
- Albers, Patricia. Joan Mitchell: Lady Painter: A Life. New York: Alfred A. Knopf, 2011. ISBN 978-0-307-59598-0 OCLC 759509852
- Cuno, James (2009). Master Paintings: In the Art Institure of Chicago. New Haven and London: Yale University Press in Association With The Art Institute of Chicago. ISBN 978-0-300-15103-9.
