= Applied anthropology =

Subfield of anthropology

Applied anthropology is the practical application of anthropological theories, methods, and practices to the analysis and solution of practical problems. The term was first put forward by Daniel G. Brinton in his paper "The Aims of Anthropology". John Van Willengen defined applied anthropology as "anthropology put to use". Applied anthropology includes conducting research with a primary or tertiary purpose to solve real-world problems in areas such as public health, education, government, and business.

In Applied Anthropology: Domains of Application, Kedia and Van Willigen define the process as a "complex of related, research-based, instrumental methods which produce change or stability in specific cultural systems through the provision of data, initiation of direct action, and/or the formulation of policy". In other words, applied anthropology is the praxis-based side of anthropological research; it includes researcher involvement and activism within the participating community.

== Spanning academic disciplines ==
The American Anthropological Association (AAA) website describes anthropology as a focus on "the study of humans, past and present. To understand the full sweep and complexity of cultures across all of human history, anthropology draws and builds upon knowledge from the social and biological sciences as well as the humanities and physical sciences." Thus, the field of anthropology encompasses four subareas: sociocultural anthropology, biological (or physical) anthropology, archaeology, and linguistic anthropology. Because a central tenet of the anthropological field is the application of shared knowledge and research about humans across the world, an anthropologist who specializes in any of these areas and enacts research into direct action and/or policy can be deemed an "applied anthropologist". In fact, some practical, real-world problems invoke all sub-disciplines of anthropological theory, method, and practice. For example, a Native American community development program may involve archaeological research to determine legitimacy of water rights claims, ethnography to assess the current and historical cultural characteristics of the community, linguistics to restore language competence among inhabitants, and medical anthropology to determine the causality of dietary deficiency diseases.

== Professional engagement ==
Applied anthropologists often work for nonacademic clients, such as governments, development agencies, non-governmental organizations (NGOs), tribal and ethnic associations, advocacy groups, social-service and educational agencies, and businesses. It is also not uncommon for an anthropologist to initiate activist work surrounding their own area of study; frequently, sociocultural anthropological studies begin as mere research inquiries that blossom into community advocacy projects, and even new specialized NGOs.

Methodology utilized in applied anthropology includes, but is not limited to, ethnography, participant observation, snowballing, interviews, and focus groups. Applied anthropologists also use textual analysis, surveying, archival research, and other empirical methods to inform policy or to market products.

== Problems and criticisms ==
The process of conducting anthropological research and then applying knowledge in attempts to improve the lives of research participants can be problematic, and is often laced with elements of Orientalism and/or colonialism. Kedia and Van Willigen describe the moral dilemma embedded in this work: "The ethical requirements of applied anthropology are especially challenging since the practitioner must negotiate an intricate balance between the interests of the clients who commission the work, and those of the community being studied." The authors continue by stating that this negotiation leads to issues of privacy, ownership, and the implications and purposes of the study being produced (p. 16).

Although guidelines regarding ethicalities of applied anthropology are put forth by major anthropological organizations—including the American Anthropological Association (AAA), the Society for Applied Anthropology (SFAA), and the National Association for the Practice of Anthropology (NAPA)—it is increasingly difficult to ensure that the high volume of worldwide anthropologists proceed with their research in ways that are both culturally relative and sensitive to community needs. Kedia and Van Willigen describe the myriad roles an applied anthropologist must play as effective resource for communities in need; a researcher must be an advocate, cultural "broker", evaluator, policy researcher, public participation specialist, and research analyst.

There has also been some criticism of the interaction between applied anthropologists and government agencies, as those agencies may want to move forward with a development project while anthropologists restrict progress studying carefully before supporting the project.

=== Debates about objectivity/cultural relativity in anthropology ===
The field of anthropology is also fraught with debate surrounding accurate and effective approaches to conducting research. More specifically, there is continued debate about the essentiality of objectivity in anthropological fieldwork. Some hermeneutic scholars contend that it is impossible to remove one's own preconceived cultural notions from one's work. In this line of thought, it is more productive to recognize that anthropologists are themselves culturally programmed observers, and must always be wary of biases that influence information they receive. In contrast, the positivist approach to anthropology emphasizes the necessity for an objective, regimented, and scientific approach to anthropological research.

The multinational phenomenon of female genital cutting (FGC) exemplifies the necessity for an anthropologist to account for relative cultural contexts: "The work of scholars who stress the fundamental importance of offering perspectives on cultural factors that promote the practice of female genital cutting has brought the debate surrounding cultural relativism into sharp focus. Greunbaum (1996) notes that analyses that do offer emic interpretations and cultural contextualizations are often criticized as bordering on advocacy for the practice" [emphasis in original]. In these instances, it is imperative that an anthropologist not cloud their own preconceived notions about health and gender relations in an attempt to "remedy" a complex social issue.

== Scholarly works and organizations ==
There are three primary groups based in the US that are founded on the application of anthropology with acute attention to ethics and social implications: American Anthropological Association (AAA), Society for Applied Anthropology (SFAA), and the National Association for the Practice of Anthropology (NAPA).

The premiere journal of applied anthropology in the United States is called Human Organization, published by the Society for Applied Anthropology. In the UK, the main journal for applied anthropology is called Anthropology in Action.

The Association of Social Anthropologists (ASA) has a network of Applied Anthropologists known as "Apply". Within the European Association of Social Anthropologists (EASA), there is the Applied Anthropology Network, which annually organises the international symposium, Why the World Needs Anthropologists. The theme of the first symposium was New Fields for Applied Anthropology in Europe (Amsterdam, 2013), followed by; Coming Out of the Ivory Tower (Padua, 2014), Burning Issues of Our Hot Planet (Ljubljana, 2015), Humanise IT (Tartu, 2016), Powering the Planet (Durham, 2017), and Designing the Future (Lisbon, 2018). Within the EASA Medical Anthropology Network, there is also an applied anthropology special interest group.

Under the direction of the Royal Anthropological Institute, Jonathan Benthall (author of The Best of Anthropology Today) created the annual Lucy Mair Medal of Applied Anthropology. This recognizes excellence in using anthropology "for the relief of poverty or distress, or for the active recognition of human dignity".

== See also ==
- Development anthropology
- Economic anthropology
- Public anthropology
