= Margaret Lantis =

American anthropologist

Margaret Lantis (September 1, 1906 – September 8, 2006) was an American anthropologist, Eskimologist, and writer.

== Education and early life ==
Margaret Lantis obtained her BA from the University of Minnesota in 1930 with a double major in Spanish and anthropology. Afterwards, she went on to study anthropology at the University of California, Berkeley under Robert Lowie and A. L. Kroeber. Lantis earned her Ph.D. in 1939 and returned to study at the University of Chicago in 1942 and at the Washington School of Psychiatry in 1947. As a woman at that time, Lantis received few opportunities in the field of Anthropology. For many years she taught at a number of different universities. Lantis was elected president of the American Ethnological Society in 1964 to 1965 and was recognized for her strong ethnographic research skills.

Throughout her work as an anthropologist, Lantis' extended ethnographic work led other anthropologists' interest to never before explored arctic cultures. While she published a number of articles and field notes, her books can be found in both local and university libraries. Eskimo childhood and interpersonal relationships: Nunivak biographies and genealogies (1960) is one of Lantis' books that has been widely reviewed. With 18 autobiographical accounts and biological sketches from Nunivak Island in east Bering Sea, the book reveals the strains and complaints felt by the small community of approximately 200 Inuit. The book is based on three different field trips: the first in 1939-40 laid the ethnographic framework of her second trip in 1946 and finally her third trip was in 1956 where she collected data to bring the life records up to date. Furthermore, these accounts are based on personality sketches and Rorschach tests from 12 men and 6 women from the island. While Lantis' purpose is to give an inside view of Nunivak culture, she also explores Nunivak personality dynamics. Her findings of high suicide and psychosis rates on the island are closely related to these sketches and life stories. In a population of 200, Lantis notes 5 cases of people suffering from psychiatric disorders of serious nature. Among these five cases are: 3 suicides, one 'mental break' and one who "appeared psychotic" which is presented as a figure of 2.5%. Being one of the first anthropologists to work with these Alaskan cultures, Lantis is known as "an authority on the contemporary culture of Alaskan Eskimos". To both non-anthropological scientists, and to anthropologists not specifically concerned with Eskimos, the Nunivak life histories present certain intriguing features that may help other field studies.

Lantis contributed studies and heritage websites such as the Native Village of Afgonak website, which is described to celebrate Afognak Alutiiq heritage. The website's main goal is to "embrace, protect, develop and enhance Alutiiq culture" and to protect traditional areas as well as to encourage unity among Alutiiq and the Kodiak Archipelago tribes. In the Heritage- Resource Archives, Lantis is listed four times as a contributor.

In her article entitled 'Vernacular Culture', Lantis draws on similar ideas and the importance of psychology and communication in relation to cultural behaviors and interactions. In this article, Lantis reflects on her interest in U.S culture and society as a themed issue she edited in the American Anthropologist "The U.S.A. as Anthropologists See It". The concept of vernacular culture places emphasis on "situationally" structured behavior and calls attention to "the culture-as-it-is-lived appropriate to well-defined places and situations". By comparing everyday situations such as going to a bus station or an after football game event, Lantis argues that there are behaviors expected or expressed in any given scenario. These places or subcultures are related to vernacular culture. Lantis argues that there are particular ways of behavior that are used in any culture-area. In the article she demonstrates a list of components such as: values and goals, appropriate time or place, common knowledge, attitude and relationship systems and finally communication. Vernacular culture, like any 'functional', unitary segment of the total culture, has these components. This issue makes the case for the use of the concept of "vernacular culture" while studying complex cultures. Lantis therefore stimulated a 'widespread use' of the term in several disciplines, most notably in architecture.

== Career ==
After receiving her PhD, Lantis worked in several public agencies, including almost ten years with the United States Public Health Service. In these positions she researched socialization, health, and economy in rural communities.

Lantis was appointed professor of anthropology at the University of Kentucky in 1965 By 1967 Lantis received tenure at the university and was appointed to the graduate school faculty where she taught until her retirement in 1974. Over the course of her tenure with the University of Kentucky Lantis published several significant pieces of literature including books and articles on the social organization and religious characteristics of Nunivak Island culture. By the 1970s the University of Kentucky Press had published a collection of papers edited by Lantis in what they claimed as a relatively new field in anthropology-ethnohistory Ethnohistory in South Western Alaska and the Southern Yukon: Method and Content was published in 1970 to which Lantis contributed a chapter on the Aleut.

Towards the end of her career she continued to write about the people of Nunivak Island and the greater Alaskan territory as well as Southern Yukon. Topics she covered during this time include social organization which she wrote about in Factionalism and Leadership: a case study of Nunivak Island. This work explored the leadership required to steer a people from a hunting and fishing economy to a modern subsistence, commercial and industrial mixed economy in a single generation. The article summarizes the bases of and opportunities for leadership in Nunivak Alaska in the period 1940–1961. And applied topics in Changes in the Alaskan Eskimo Relation of Man to Dog and Their Effect on two Human Diseases a paper that discusses how culture change can bring about change in the health of a population and particularly how this change has influenced the incidence of several parasites among Alaskan Inuit and Yuit. The U.S Bureau of Indian Affairs also published a series of lectures given by Lantis at a workshop in Anchorage Alaska in 1968. She also contributed a chapter on Arctic Aleut people to the Handbook of North American Indians in 1984.

While teaching graduate students at the University of Kentucky Lantis was also working with several committees and societies. She served as the president of the American Ethnological Society 1964-65 she was on the Polar Research Committee of the National Academy of Sciences 1969-72 and was elected president of the Society for Applied Anthropology 1973–74. She was the only woman who served on any of the seven panels of the Committee on the Alaska Earthquake which began its work soon after The Good Friday Earthquake which occurred in 1964. She contributed a paper to the second volume published by the National Academy of Sciences on the earthquake entitled Human Ecology of the Great Alaska Earthquake and her report on the 1964 Alaskan Earthquake Impact of the Earthquake on Health and Mortality was significant and among the first contributions to disaster studies in anthropology.

Her work on the Alaskan Earthquake helped the University of Kentucky gain notability on a national scale for its focus in applied anthropology as noted by the chairman of the university's anthropology department in 1971 "the department has achieved national visibility as one of the few in the country focusing on the applied area," referring to Lantis's research on disaster and nutrition in Alaska and among American Indigenous Peoples. Lantis went on to publish another book on the disaster, titled When the Earthquake hits Home: Anchorage in the "Great Alaska Earthquake" which explored how households in Anchorage coped with the disaster in the immediate emergency period and household practices that existed two years later.

== Later life ==
Considered a "specialist in Arctic and Subarctic anthropology" her life's work became an important contribution to knowledge of Alaskan Native people's personality and culture. After nearly nine years teaching at the University of Kentucky, Lantis retired in 1974 though she remained an active participant in the anthropology community at the school for many years helping generations of arctic scholars by offering advice and sharing her research notes. One example of this was her encouragement of the publication of Nunivak Island Eskimo (Yuit) Technology and Material Culture which was written by James Vanstone in 1989 and relies heavily on Lantis's field notes and observations of the material culture in use during her stay on the island 1939–40. The article discusses the manufacture and use of items associated with sea and land hunting, fishing, transportation, shelter construction, household activities, food prep and skin working. The paper's success is based on the extraneous detail put into the descriptions of the above-mentioned material culture and the insight into division of labour and women's activities offered by Lantis's notes and attributed to her own gender and length of stay on the island. Lantis also donated much of her collection of artifacts compiled over the course of her research in the Arctic region to the University of Kentucky Museum of Anthropology in 1973, 1977 and 1978. Among the artifacts is a collection of Nunivak children's toys.

She was designated as an honorary life member of the Alaska Anthropology Association and was recognized for her contributions to Alaskan anthropology with a lifetime achievement award in 1993 and was the recipient of the Society for Applied Anthropology's Bronislaw Malinowski Award in 1987 which she was given in recognition of the years she spent applying anthropology to help people through her work in public service. Addressing applied anthropologists Lantis presented a survey of characteristics of leadership in her Malinowski award presentation entitled Two important roles in organizations and communities which focused on the roles of leader and follower in those institutions.

According to her obituary in American Anthropologist, Lantis never learned to drive a car but "mastered the techniques of dog sledding." She never married instead dedicated herself to her work as a professional anthropologist and later in her life served the discipline through her continued interest in current events related to Alaskan natives. She was inspiring generations of arctic scholars and applied anthropologists by sharing her experiences and offering advice well into her nineties before her death at the age of 100.

== Bibliography ==
- Social Culture of the Nunivak Eskimo (American Philosophical Society, 1950)
- Alaskan Eskimo Ceremonialism: Monograph XI of the American Ethnological Society (1947)
- The Reindeer Industry in Alaska (1950)
- Eskimo Childhood and Interpersonal Relationships: Nunivak Biographies and Genealogies (1960)
- (editor) Ethnohistory in Southwestern Alaska and the Southern Yukon (University Press of Kentucky, 1970) ISBN 9780813112152
