= Wíčazo Ša Review =

- Discipline: Native American studies
- Language: English
- Edited by: Lloyd L. Lee

Publication details
- History: 1985–present
- Publisher: University of Minnesota Press (United States)
- Frequency: Biannually

Standard abbreviations
- ISO 4: Wíčazo Ša Rev.

Indexing
- ISSN: 0749-6427 (print); 1533-7901 (web)
- LCCN: 90656087
- JSTOR: 07496427
- OCLC no.: 730022200

Links
- Journal homepage; Online access at Project MUSE

The Wíčazo Ša Review ("Red Pencil" in Lakota) is a biannual peer-reviewed academic journal of Native American studies. The journal was established in 1985 by editors-in-chief Elizabeth Cook-Lynn (Dakota Santee), Dr. Beatrice Medicine (Lakota), Roger Buffalohead (Ponca), and Dr. William Willard (Cherokee). Wíčazo Ša Review is published by the University of Minnesota Press, which acquired it in 1999. Originally, it was published at Eastern Washington University, under the guidance of its Native American Studies center. Issues include essays, articles, interviews, reviews, poems, short stories, course outlines, curriculum designs, scholarly research and literary criticism reflective of Native American studies and related fields. The current editor is Dr. Lloyd L. Lee (enrolled Navajo Nation citizen) of the University of New Mexico, who took over the position from James Riding In (Arizona State University).
