= Dedra Buchwald =

American epidemiologist

- Born: Michigan, USA
- Spouse: Spero Manson

Academic background
- Education: BS, Neurobiology, 1976, MD, University of California, San Diego

Dedra S. Buchwald is an American epidemiologist. She is a retired professor at the University of Washington.

== Early life and education ==
Buchwald was born near Detroit, Michigan, to two German immigrants. As a teenager, she co-established a "Free School" which aimed at providing school-aged children with an alternative learning system. Upon graduating from high school, Buchwald completed her Bachelor of Science degree in neurobiology and her medical degree from the University of California, San Diego. She then completed her internship and residency at the North Carolina Memorial Hospital and Duke University Medical Center. Following this, Buchwald became a Henry J. Kaiser Fellow in general internal medicine at Harvard Medical School and Brigham and Women's Hospital.

== Career ==
=== University of Washington ===
Following her fellowship, Buchwald joined the faculty of the University of Washington School of Medicine (UW) and School of Public Health for 29 years. During her tenure, she directed and cared for patients in the International Clinic and created Partnerships for Native Health. As the director of this program, Buchwald helped conduct one of the largest alcohol addiction-treatment trials among American Indian and Alaska Native adults titled the HONOR Project (Helping Our Natives' Ongoing Recovery). She also oversaw the Regional Native American Community Networks Program to address cancer-related disparities among American Indians and Alaska Natives. Beyond this, Buchwald also directed the Chronic Fatigue Syndrome Cooperative Research Center where she conducted studies with twins using the Department of Licensing identification system.

=== Washington State University ===
Buchwald left UW in 2015 to join the faculty at Washington State University (WSU) as the director of their Initiative for Research and Education to Advance Community Health (IREACH). In this role, she followed up with surviving participants from the 1989 Strong Heart Study of Native Americans study and reconducted brain scans to understand declining Native American elder health. In 2018, Buchwald was appointed director of the Native Alzheimer's Disease-Related Resource Center in Minority Aging which was a collaboration between WSU, the University of Colorado, Denver, and Stanford University. Following the establishment of the center, Buchwald received the 2019 Faculty Woman of Distinction Award.

During the COVID-19 pandemic, Buchwald received a grant to address the lack of COVID information and testing being spread among American Indian and Native Alaskan populations. She then launched a multi-center project to assess levels of testing and challenges that prevent urban American Indians and Alaska Natives from getting tested and vaccinated. In 2021, Buchwald was one of 18 doctors and scientists selected to identify a new editor-in-chief for JAMA (The Journal of the American Medical Association).

== Personal life ==
Buchwald is married to Spero Manson, a medical and cultural anthropologist at the University of Colorado Denver.
