= Anthropology in Action =

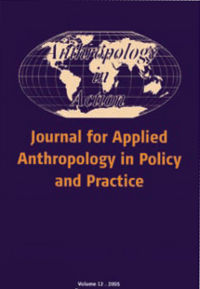
- Discipline: Anthropology
- Language: English
- Edited by: Christine McCourt

Publication details
- History: 2005-present
- Publisher: Berghahn Books
- Frequency: Triannually

Standard abbreviations
- ISO 4: Anthropol. Action

Indexing
- ISSN: 0967-201X
- JSTOR: https://www.jstor.org/journal/cambanth

Links
- Journal homepage

Anthropology in Action is a peer-reviewed academic journal published by Berghahn Books that covers anthropological subjects through commentaries, key articles, research reports, and book reviews. The editor-in-chief is Christine McCourt (City University London).

== Abstracting and indexing ==
Anthropology in Action is indexed and abstracted in:

- Anthropological Index
- Abstracts in Anthropology
- International Bibliography of Book Reviews of Scholarly Literature on the Humanities and Social Sciences
- International Bibliography of Periodicals
- MLA International Bibliography
- Scopus
- Sociological Abstracts
