= Patricia Albers =

American anthropologist and art historian

- Born: December 1943 (age 82)
- Other names: Patricia C. Albers; PC Albers
- Education: Michigan State University (Master's), University of Wisconsin–Madison (Ph.D.)
- Occupations: Anthropologist, professor, writer
- Known for: Anthropologist of Native Americans
- Spouse: Steven M. Hall (1941–2011)

Patricia C. Albers (born December 1943) is an American anthropologist who has written and edited anthropology books about Native Americans and has been a professor of anthropology at the University of Utah. She led and participated in events to discuss and show what life had been like for Native Americans. Her research included living on a Sioux reservation and she collected oral histories of Native Americans. Albers and Beatrice Medicine collaborated and edited the book The Hidden Half: Studies or Plains Indian Women to dispel stereotypes and document the lives of women who have lived on the Plains.

== Personal life ==
Albers was born in December 1943. She was married to Steven McCormick Hall, with whom they had a daughter, Shannon. Steven Hall grew up and lived in Salt Lake City, Utah. Albers lived in Salt Lake City, Utah, from 1983 to 1998, when she and her husband moved to Minneapolis, Minnesota. Steven Hall died on March 1, 2011. Albers lived in Minneapolis until 2020, or later.

== Education and early career ==
Albers was a graduate anthropology student at Michigan State University, where she met Beatrice Medicine. They researched and wrote articles based upon Albers' 2 1/2-year experience at Devils Lake Reservation of the Sioux in North Dakota and Medicine's research at Standing Rock Indian Reservation with the Hunkpapa Sioux in the Dakotas. They researched powwows an important social celebration. Albers studied for her Ph.D. at the University of Wisconsin–Madison and the subject of her dissertation, published in 1975, was The regional system of the Devil's Lake Sioux: its structure, composition, development, and functions.

== Career ==
=== Educator ===
By 1975, Albers was associate professor of anthropology at University of Utah. She received a superior teaching award at the University of Utah in 1989. In 1995, Albers became the director of the American West Center at the university that advocates for Native American rights, documents the histories of native tribes, and conducts research, employing students who gain first-hand experience. Each year, the Center offers one scholarship to an undergraduate and another to a graduate student. The recipients use the $1,000 stipend to complete a project about society in the American West. The Center has also held weekly Twighlight Talks about Native Americans. Albers was the speaker for the first talk, "Symbol, Sight, and Stereotype: A Century Changing Images of Plains Indian Nations on the Picture Postcard".

Albers was the director of American Indian studies at the University of Minnesota, Minneapolis by 2002. By 2018, she was professor emeritus of the University of Minnesota.

=== Anthropologist ===
In 1975, Albers advocated for an autonomous Indian Bureau that would not be subject to the agendas of political parties. Being independent, they could focus on solving ongoing problems—hunger, unemployment, high rate of tuberculosis and diabetes deaths, and welfare dependency—experienced by Native Americans.

The Hidden Half: Studies or Plains Indian Women (1983), edited by Albers and Medicine, provides insight into the lives of Plains Indian women and dispels stereotypes about who they were. Albers states "that the role of a woman warrior is every bit as fitting" as for men. The portrayal of Plains Indian women is generally as "beasts of burden" and slaves. Scholarly articles were selected about women of Plains tribes over time and the opinions about the women and their roles. The lives of the women were first told by Albers and Medicine in a symposium in 1973.

Albers contributed an essay for the book Women's West (1987), edited by Susan Armitage and Elizabeth Jameson. It is a collection of essays about how women of European, Native American, Hispanic, and Mexican descent played a role in the making of the Western United States. She also contributed to the book History, Power, and Identity: Ethnogenesis in the Americas, 1492-1992 (1996), edited by Jonathan D. Hill. The book explores how Indigenous and African American people managed exploitation, enslavement, and displacement by whites in the Americas. Her research of the history of Native Americans of the Black Hills was published in Peter Nabokov's book Where the Lightning Strikes: The Lives of American Indian Sacred Places (2006).

=== Presentations ===
Albers says that "a powwow is the most important expression of the content of American Indian life", because they reinforce relationships, values, and cultural practices. Powwows range from private events within communities to large powwows open to all Native Americans. During the summer, there are powwows held every weekend across the United States. Events can include traditional dances, contests, feasts, crafts, and musical entertainment. Dancers wear elaborate garments that can take hundreds of hours to make.

In 1986, she was a participating scholar in a workshop about the spiritual and cultural significance of powwow celebrations. It was funded by a grant from the Utah Endowment for the Humanities and was held by the Multi-Cultural Center of the Southern Utah State College (now Southern Utah University). In 1993, she was a keynote speaker at the University of Maine's Look at Us as a celebration for Native American month.

In 1996, Albers was the speaker, along with Michael Terry who depicted the role of a man, in a replica Native American village set up at the Museum of the Mountain Man. The Pinedale Fine Arts Council sponsored the "19th Century Plains Indian" presentation to show what life was like on the Plains many years ago. Albers was the keynote speaker for the conference about Blackfeet women entitled "Aakiiksi: Women" in 2002. It was sponsored by the Piegan Institute.

== Publications ==
=== Oral history ===
- Patricia Albers; South Dakota Oral History Center; American Indian Research Project (1968), Sound recording of the Oak River Celebration in Griswald, Manitoba: Oak River Celebration and pow wow, OCLC 958637857 at USD University Libraries, University of South Dakota
- Patricia Albers; South Dakota Oral History Center; American Indian Research Project (1968), Sound recording of the Portage La Prairie pow wow in Manitoba, including Lone Buffalo and Twin Butte musical groups, OCLC 958639288
- Patricia Albers; Marguerite Fiddler (1968), American Indian oral history research project, no. 215: Cannonball celebration, OCLC 23768825
- Patricia Albers (1968), American Indian oral history research project, no. 221: Fort Totten days, OCLC 23768854

=== Books ===
- Albers, Patricia; Medicine, Beatrice (1983). The Hidden Half: Studies of Plains Indian Women. University Press of America. ISBN 978-1-4617-1965-6.
- Albers, Patricia; James, William R. (1983). Tourism and the changing photographic image of the Great Lakes Indians. J. Jafari and Pergamon Press. OCLC 10810003.

=== Articles ===
- Articles and chapters, Patricia Albers, WorldCat

== See also ==
- Native American studies
- Cultural studies
