= Judith Freidenberg =

- Born: Buenos Aires, Argentina

Judith Noemí Freidenberg is an Argentine writer, professor and anthropologist.

She lives in the United States.
