= Human Organization =

- Discipline: Anthropology
- Language: English
- Edited by: Lenore Manderson

Publication details
- History: 1941 to present
- Publisher: Society for Applied Anthropology (United States)
- Frequency: Quarterly

Standard abbreviations
- ISO 4: Hum. Organ.

Indexing
- ISSN: 0018-7259

Links
- Journal homepage

Human Organization is the peer-reviewed research journal of the Society for Applied Anthropology. Published quarterly since 1941, it is the second-longest continuously published journal in cultural anthropology in the United States. Its primary objective is to analyze practical human problems through the application of anthropological theory and data. The journal regularly features articles on human rights, public health and medical care, and indigenous knowledge and management of natural resources.
