= Society for Applied Anthropology =

- Abbreviation: SfAA
- Formation: 1941
- Members: 2000+
- President: A.J. Faas
- Website: Society for Applied Anthropology

The Society for Applied Anthropology (SfAA) is a worldwide organization for the Applied Social Sciences, established "to promote the integration of anthropological perspectives and methods in solving human problems throughout the world; to advocate for fair and just public policy based upon sound research; to promote public recognition of anthropology as a profession; and to support the continuing professionalization of the field." Members include academic as well as practicing and applied anthropologists. The Society is unique among professional associations in membership and purpose – and in representing the interests of professionals in a wide range of settings including academia, business, law, public health, medicine, environment, and government. The unifying factor is a commitment to making an impact on the quality of life in the world. The Society publishes two journals: Human Organization and Practicing Anthropology. The SfAA was founded in 1941 and has maintained its status as an important resource for practicing and academic anthropologists alike.

== Committees and interest groups ==
The SfAA consists of several special committees and interest groups that allow members to have meaningful dialog with other members from their specialized area of interest.

=== Committees ===
- Award Committees
- Standing Committees
- Special Committees
- Consortium of Practicing & Applied Anthropologists (COPAA)
- Human Rights & Social Justice Committee
- International Committee (SfAA Global)
- Oral History Committee

=== Topical Interest Groups (TIG) ===
- Anthropolgoy and AI
- Anthropology of Higher Ed
- Business, Nonprofit, & Government
- Disability
- ExtrAction & Environment
- Fisheries & Coastal Communities
- Gender-Based Violence
- Migration and International Dialogue
- Medical Anthropologiests & Social Scientists in Health
- Risk and Disasters
- Tourism & Heritage

== Publications ==
The SfAA has a number of publications. The journals Human Organization and Practicing Anthropology are the best known of the SfAA's publications. The SfAA also publishes The Classics of Practicing Anthropology; Human Rights: The Scholar as Activist - a special volume exploring how scholars can become advocates against human rights violations; and a curated volume of essays honoring Malinowski Award recipients.

=== Human Organization ===
Human Organization is the main journal for the Society for Applied Anthropology. It is the leading publication for peer reviewed scholarship in the applied sciences. The journal publishes articles that examine and apply methods and theories of anthropology as solutions to problems facing the contemporary world. Publications include original research, analyses of methods, and discussions of research practices. Articles consist of no more than 8,000 previously unpublished words. The journal is distributed online or via mail to current dues paying members of the SfAA. The journal is also available to purchase online for non-members.

=== Practicing Anthropology ===
Practicing Anthropology is a publication for members of the SfAA who work outside academia. The journal seeks to link practicing anthropologists with academic anthropologists, inform policy research and implementation, and provide a reflexive look into the history and future of anthropology as a discipline. The journal is driven by its contributors who are encouraged to submit special issues as well as individual research articles for publication. Practicing Anthropology is an editor-reviewed publication. There is no fee to contributing authors who are current SfAA members. The journal is distributed online or via mail to current dues paying members of the SfAA. The journal is also available to purchase online for non-members.

== Meetings ==
The SfAA has an annual meeting every spring (March or April), usually in the US. Archived programs for meetings are available online back to 1999. The SfAA hosts its annual meeting with a number of co-sponsoring professional organizations that have similar goals. Some of these organizations include the Council on Nursing and Anthropology, the Society for Medical Anthropology, and the Political Ecoloty Society.

=== Malinowski Award ===
Since 1973 the SfAA has awarded the Malinowski Award annually. The award is named in honor of famed anthropologist Bronislaw Malinowski. Malinowski was a leading advocate for the application of anthropological methods to address the world's problems. Malinowski argued that "anthropologists must advocate for native populations, involve themselves in policy matters and politics, and research contemporary social issues".

=== Sol Tax Distinguished Service Award ===
The Sol Tax Distinguished Service Award is an award given by the Society and named after Sol Tax, an anthropologist known for creating action anthropology and founding the academic journal Current Anthropology. It is presented to an individual who has provided long-term and truly distinguished service to the Society. The award is presented annually, beginning in 2002.
