= João Biehl =

Brazilian anthropologist and professor

- Born: Brazil
- Citizenship: American
- Education: University of California, Berkeley
- Awards: Rudolf Virchow Award (2008 & 2005), Margaret Mead Award (2007)
- Scientific career
- Fields: Medical Anthropology
- Workplaces: Princeton University
- Thesis: The Brazilian Control of HIV/AIDS (1999)
- Doctoral advisor: Paul Rabinow

João Guilherme Biehl is a Brazilian medical anthropologist known for his innovative studies of global health, poverty, and suffering. He is currently the Susan Dod Brown Professor of Anthropology, Chair of the Department of Anthropology, and Director of the Brazil LAB at Princeton University.

Biehl's scholarship has earned widespread acclaim, as well as several of the anthropology's most prestigious awards. These include the Margaret Mead Award, Diana Forsythe Prize, and two Rudolf Virchow Awards. Biehl was also a 2008 Guggenheim Fellow.

== Early life and education ==
Biehl grew up in the favelas outside of the town of Novo Hamburgo in Southern Brazil after migrating from the colonial interior with his parents and sister at the age of 4. He showed an early interest in education, entering the first grade and completing grade school a year earlier than most other children in Novo Hamburgo. He cites his passion for storytelling as stemming from receiving books for Christmas as a child, a rare commodity for poor families in the favelas.

After completing high school he began studying journalism and theology at two different academic institutions, along with Greek and German, church history, philosophy and systematic theology in Porto Alegre. Biehl received his Bachelor of Arts in Theology from Escola Superior de Teologia da IECLB in 1985, his Bachelor of Arts in Journalism from Universidade Federal do Rio Grande do Sul in 1985, his Master's of Arts in Philosophy from Universidade Federal de Santa Maria in 1991, his Masters of Arts in Anthropology from University of California, Berkeley in 1994, his Doctor of Philosophy in Religion from the Graduate Theological Union at Berkeley in 1996, and his Doctor of Philosophy in Anthropology from Berkeley in 1999.

Biehl was a National Institute of Mental Health postdoctoral fellow at Harvard University in the Department of Anthropology and the Department of Global Health & Social Medicine from 1998 to 2000.

== Career ==
João Biehl has been a member of the Institute for Advanced Study, Princeton (2002–03 and 2005–06); and a visiting professor at the Ecole des Hautes Etudes, Paris (2004). He is currently the Susan Dod Brown Professor of Anthropology at Princeton where he teaches medical anthropology and courses on science, technology and society, cultural globalization, and social theory. He is also the Co-Director of the Program in Global Health and Health Policy and holds an Old Dominion Professorship in the Council of Humanities. Professor Biehl held the Harold Willis Dodds Presidential University Fellowship (2004–2006) and received the Presidential Distinguished Teaching Award in 2005. He is currently coordinating a research and teaching partnership between Princeton University and the University of São Paulo centered on global health and the anthropology of health and medicine, along with a collaborative network on "Race and Citizenship in the Americas." He has been on the executive committee of 4 programs at Princeton (the Program of Latin American Studies, the Center for the Study of Religion, the Community-Based Learning Initiative, and Examination and Standing) and was the Director of Graduate Studies in the Department of Anthropology from 2004-2005 and 2011-2012. Biehl was an Academic Adviser at Wilson College from 2004 to 2007, and has taught more than 20 undergraduate and graduate classes at Princeton since joining the faculty. He has also been a guest lecturer at more than 50 different universities around the world.

== Publications ==
Biehl has written two books in English: Vita: Life in a Zone of Social Abandonment (University of California Press 2005) and Will to Live: AIDS Therapies and the Politics of Survival (Princeton University Press 2007). The books are ethnographic studies of the experience and treatment of mental illness and HIV/AIDS, respectively. Both Vita and Will to Live explore new geographies of access and marginalization that have emerged alongside pharmaceutical globalization. They also elaborate on networks of care that poor urban patients create in their daily struggles to survive. He has also written 4 books in Portuguese: "Entre as Montanhas" ("Between the Mountains") (Literalis, 2004), "Clandestino: No Cotidiano e na Teologia" ("Clandestine: Theology and Ordinary Life ") (Vozes/Sinodal, 1990), "Igual pra Igual: Um Diálogo Crítico entre a Teologia da Libertação e as Teologias Negra, Feminista e Pacifista" ("From Equal to Equal: A Critical Dialogue between Latin American Liberation Theology and Black, Feminist and Pacifist Theologies") (Vozes/Sinodal, 1987) and "Tudo a Ver: Uma Viagem Sem Roteiros pela América do Sul" ("All to See: A Journey through South America") (Sinodal, 1987.) Biehl is the co-editor of "When People Come First: Critical Studies in Global Health" (Princeton University Press) and Subjectivity: Ethnographic Investigations (University of California Press 2007) and of the book series "Critical Global Health" (Duke University Press.) He is writing the history of a fratricidal war—the Mucker war—that took place among German immigrants in 1874 in southern Brazil. His ethnographic research focuses on domestic crimes and the monetarization of kinship ties in that region. His work has been published in American Ethnologist; Culture, Medicine, and Psychiatry; Journal of Latin American Cultural Studies; Public Culture; and Social Text.

== Awards ==
"Vita" garnered six major book awards, including the Margaret Mead Award of the American Anthropological Association. "Will to Live" received the Wellcome Medal of Britain's Royal Anthropological Society and the Diana Forsythe Prize of the American Anthropological Association. Biehl received Princeton University's Presidential Distinguished Teaching Award in 2005 and the Graduate Mentoring Award in 2012. His research has been supported by grants from the John Simon Guggenheim Memorial Foundation, the John D. and Catherine T. MacArthur Foundation, the Wenner-Gren Foundation, the Ford Foundation, Princeton's Health Grand Challenges Initiative, and Princeton's Council of International Teaching and Research Foundation.
