= Seth M. Holmes =

American Medical Anthropologist

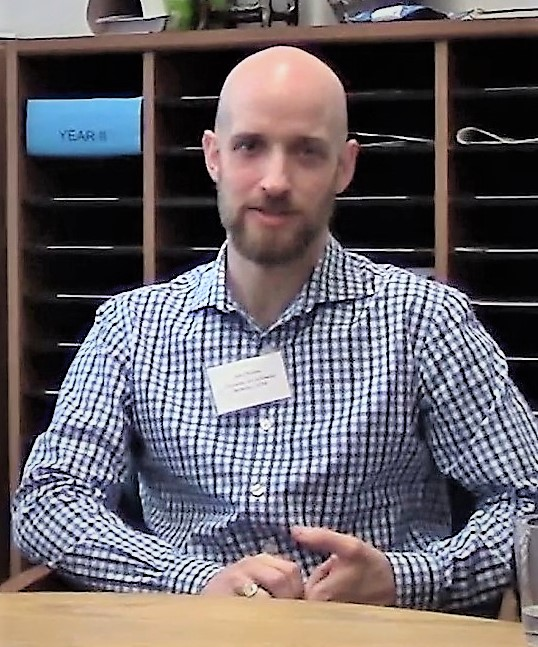
Holmes at the 2017 National Conference for Physician Scholars in the Social Sciences and Humanities (SHSSM)

Seth M. Holmes (born 1975) is Chancellor's Professor of Environmental Science, Policy and Management and Medical Anthropology at the University of California Berkeley. He also serves as founder and co-chair (with Charles L. Briggs) of the Berkeley Center for Social Medicine, co-director (with Ian Whitmarsh) of the MD/Ph.D. Track in Medical Anthropology coordinated between UC Berkeley and UCSF. Currently, he is an ICREA researcher in the Department of Social Anthropology at the University of Barcelona and PI of the ERC FOODCIRCUITS project and the national AGRIHEAT project. A cultural anthropologist and physician, Holmes focuses on social inequalities, immigration, ethnic hierarchies, health and health care. His work has provided a particularly strong ethnographic critique of behaviorism in medicine.

Holmes has also been a fellow in the Division of Medical Humanities at the University of Rochester (2004), an intern and resident in the Physician Scientist Pathway in the Department of Medicine at the Hospital of the University of Pennsylvania (2007–2009), a tutor in the Department of Global Health and Social Medicine at Harvard Medical School (2009), a Robert Wood Johnson Foundation Health & Society Scholar at Columbia University (2009 to 2011), and a fellow in the International Research Center Work and the Lifecourse in Global Historical Perspective at Humboldt University in Berlin (2015–2016). He received the 2015 Margaret Mead Award from the American Anthropological Association and the Society for Applied Anthropology for “broadening the impact of anthropology”.

== Education ==
Holmes holds a Ph.D. in Medical Anthropology at UC Berkeley and UC San Francisco, a M.D. at the School of Medicine, UC San Francisco, and a B.S. in Ecology and Spanish / Latin American Studies at the University of Washington. Holmes also completed his Robert Wood Johnson Health & Society Scholars Program at Columbia University.

== Publications ==
Holmes' book Fresh Fruit, Broken Bodies: Migrant Farmworkers in the United States was published in 2013 by the University of California Press in the California Series in Public Anthropology. A second edition of the book was published in 2023 with an epilogue co-authored by Jorge Ramirez-Lopez, focused on the social and health movements engaged in by protagonists in the book. The book is based on 18 months full-time multi-sited ethnographic research within a transnational migrant agricultural circuit linking villages in the mountains of Oaxaca, Mexico, to agricultural areas of Central California, Oregon, and Washington state. The book won the 2013 Society for the Anthropology of Work Book Award, the 2013 New Millennium Book Award from the Society for Medical Anthropology, the 2014 Association for Humanist Sociology Book Award, and the 2015 James M. Blaut Award from the Cultural and Political Ecology Specialty Group of the Association of American Geographers. The book utilizes first-hand ethnographic field notes and transcripts from interviews, alongside anthropological theory to analyze the effects of economic and border enforcement policies on indigenous people from Southern Mexico, the effects of ethnicity and citizenship hierarchies on health, the interactions and misunderstandings between Mexican migrant patients and their physicians, as well as the ways in which social and health inequalities come to be taken for granted as well as sometimes confronted and challenged.

He has also conducted research on medical education and the ways in which medical trainees learn to manage uncertainty and perform clinical competence, which led to the publication of the special issue of Culture, Medicine and Psychiatry “Anthropologies of Contemporary Clinical Training”, co-edited with Angela Jenks and Scott Stonington. Along with many others at the intersection of the social sciences and medicine, he has worked on other broad topics leading to the publication of a special issue of PLoS Medicine “Social Medicine in the Twenty-First Century” (2006), co-edited with Scott Stonington, and the publication of the special issue of Social Science and Medicine “Ethnography of Health for Social Change”, co-edited with Helena Hansen and Danielle Lindemann.

In response to the European refugee crisis, he co-edited a curated issue of American Ethnologist “Refugees and Immigrants: Mobilities, In/exclusions, and Activisms” with Heide Castaneda, Daniel Monterescu, and Anastiina Kallius. He co-edited with Scott Stonington, Helena Hansen, Jeremy Greene, Michelle Morse, Angela Jenks, Paul Farmer, and Sir Michael Marmot the New England Journal of Medicine "Case Studies in Social Medicine", bringing together clinical cases with social science concepts. Holmes has published articles in anthropology, public health, medical, and immigration studies journals, one of which received the 2006 Rudolf Virchow Award from the Society for Medical Anthropology. In addition, he has written for The Huffington Post, Access Denied, Salon.com and been interviewed by multiple newspapers, journals as well as NPR, PRI, Pacifica Radio and Radio Bilingue shows.
