= Arthur Kleinman =

American psychiatrist

- Born: March 1, 1941 (age 85); New York City
- Other name: Arthur Michael Kleinman
- Citizenship: United States
- Education: Stanford University, Harvard University
- Spouse: Joan Kleinman (d.)
- Children: Peter and Anne
- Scientific career
- Workplaces: Harvard Medical School, Harvard University

Arthur Michael Kleinman (born March 11, 1941) is an American psychiatrist, social anthropologist and a professor of medical anthropology, psychiatry and global health and social medicine at Harvard University.

Kleinman's medical anthropology research has largely focused on China. He began his work in Taiwan in 1968, and then expanded to mainland China in 1978.

At Harvard, Kleinman has taught at all levels for decades. These efforts include teaching, supervision and mentorship of undergraduate students, anthropology graduate students, medical students, and post-doctoral fellows.

== Education ==
Arthur Kleinman received his A.B. and M.D. from Stanford University and M.A. in Social Anthropology from Harvard. He did an internship in internal medicine at the Yale School of Medicine and his psychiatric residency at the Massachusetts General Hospital.

== Career ==
Kleinman is the Esther and Sidney Rabb Professor of Anthropology at Harvard and professor of medical anthropology and professor of psychiatry at Harvard Medical School.

Kleinman has held a variety of administrative positions, including chair of Harvard's Department of Anthropology, chair of Harvard Medical School's Department of Social Medicine, and director of Harvard's Asia Center (2008–2016).

In 2011, Kleinman was named a Harvard College Professor and given the Distinguished Faculty Award.

In 1976, he founded the journal Culture, Medicine and Psychiatry, and was its Editor-in-Chief until 1986. The journal was continued by Byron and Mary-Jo Good and Peter J. Guarnaccia.

Kleinman directed the World Mental Health Report, released at the UN in 1995, and also directed the World Bank Out of the Shadows Report in 2016. He co-chaired the American Psychiatric Association's Taskforce on Culture and DSM-IV, co-chaired the 2002 Institute of Medicine report on Preventing Suicide, and also co-chaired in 2001 and 2002 both the NIH conference on the Science and Ethics of the Placebo and the NIH conference on Stigma. In September 2003, he gave the Distinguished Lecture sponsored by the Fogarty International Center at NIH on the Global Epidemic of Depression and Suicide. He was on the Counsel of the Fogarty International Center, NIH, and on the NIH Council of Councils. He was a consultant to the WHO where he chaired the technical advisory committee of the Nations for Mental Health Action Program, and in December 2002, gave the keynote address to the WHO's first international conference on global mental health research.

== Writing ==
Kleinman has authored seven books and over 350 articles, book chapters, reviews and introductions. Perhaps Kleinman's most influential work is Patients and Healers in the Context of Culture (1980), followed by The Illness Narratives: Suffering, Healing, and the Human Condition (1988) and Social Origins of Distress and Disease: Depression, Neurasthenia, and Pain in Modern China (1986). His book, What Really Matters (Oxford University Press, 2006), addresses existential dangers and uncertainties that make moral experience, religion, and ethics so crucial to individuals and society today. This book has been translated and published in Chinese editions both in Shanghai and Taipei. His most recent book The Soul of Care: The Moral Education of a Husband and a Doctor was published by Penguin in 2019.

Kleinman is the co-author of four books including A Passion for Society: How We Think About Human Suffering (2016) with Iain Wilkinson and Deep China: The Moral Life of the Person. What Anthropology and Psychiatry Tell us about China Today (2011) with six of his former students. Kleinman has co-authored many works with other psychiatrists, anthropologists and researchers in the field of global health including the late Paul Farmer (his former student), Veena Das, Margaret Lock, Michael Phillips, Byron Good, Mary Del-Vecchio Good, Tsung-yi Lin and Leon Eisenberg (his former teacher).

Kleinman is co-editor of 29 volumes, including: Social Suffering; Culture and Depression; SARS in China; Global Pharmaceuticals; Subjectivity: Ethnographic Investigations; Reimagining Global Health: An Introduction; The Culture of Illness and Psychiatric Practice in Africa; and The Ground Between: Anthropologists Engage Philosophy. He has also co-edited 11 special issues of journals and published essays in The Lancet, New England Journal of Medicine, The Harvard Magazine, among other media.

== Awards and recognition ==
Kleinman is a member of the National Academy of Medicine (formerly the Institute of Medicine) of the National Academies and the American Academy of Arts and Sciences. He has delivered numerous lectures on a variety of topics at universities around the world. He has been a fellow of the Guggenheim Foundation and the Center for Advanced Study in the Behavioral Sciences (Stanford). He is Distinguished Lifetime Fellow of the American Psychiatric Association and the American Anthropological Association.

Kleinman has twice given the Distinguished Lecture at NIH and was a member of its Council of Councils (the advisory board to the director) from 2007 to 2011. He was also appointed by the Secretary of the Department of Health and Human Services of the U.S. Government to the Advisory Council of the Fogarty International Center, National Institutes of Health. In 2003, Kleinman chaired the Selection Committee for the NIH's new Pioneer Awards.

In 2006, he received the Lifetime Achievement Award from the Society for Medical Anthropology, and in 2008, he received from the Society for Medical Anthropology the George Foster Award. In 2004, he was awarded the Doubleday Medal in Medical Humanities by University of Manchester, England. In 2007, he received an award in the medical humanities at Imperial College, London He is a winner of the Wellcome Prize of the Royal Anthropological Institute; a recipient of an honorary Doctorate of Science from York University (Canada); and the 2001, was winner of the Franz Boas Award of the American Anthropological Association, its highest award. He was awarded an honorary professorship at Fudan University. Shortly thereafter, he was Cleveringa Professor at the University of Leiden in the Netherlands. Most recently, he was elected Honorary Academician, Academia Sinica, Taiwan.

== Personal life ==
Kleinman was born and raised in New York. He was married to the late Joan Kleinman (who died in 2011), a sinologist and his research collaborator, for 45 years. They have two children (Peter and Anne) and four grandchildren (Gabriel, Kendall, Allegra and Clayton).

== Selected list of published works ==
- Patients and healers in the context of culture : an exploration of the borderland between anthropology, medicine, and psychiatry / Arthur Kleinman. -- University of California Press, 1980.
- Culture and depression : studies in the anthropology and cross-cultura l psychiatry of affect and disorder / edited by Arthur Kleinman and Byron Good. -- University of California Press, 1985. --
- Social origins of distress and disease : depression, neurasthenia, and pain in modern China / Kleinman—Yale University Press, 1986
- The illness narratives: suffering, healing, and the human condition / Kleinman—Basic Books, 1988
- Rethinking psychiatry : from cultural category to personal experience / Kleinman; Free Press, 1991 ISBN 0-02-917441-4
- Social suffering / edited by Kleinman, Veena Das, and Margaret Lock—University of California Press, 1997 & Oxford University Press, 1997
- Writing at the margin : discourse between anthropology and medicine / Kleinman. -- University of California Press, 1995
- What really matters: living a moral life amidst uncertainty and danger / Kleinman—Oxford University Press, 2006. Translated into Chinese: Shanghai Joint Publishing Company, Shanghai, P.R. China, 2007; translated in Chinese: PsyGarden Publishing Company, Taiwan, 2007
- The soul of care: the moral education of a husband and a doctor / Kleinman— Penguin, description and arrow-searchable preview, 2019
