= Emily Mendenhall =

American medical anthropologist (born 1982)

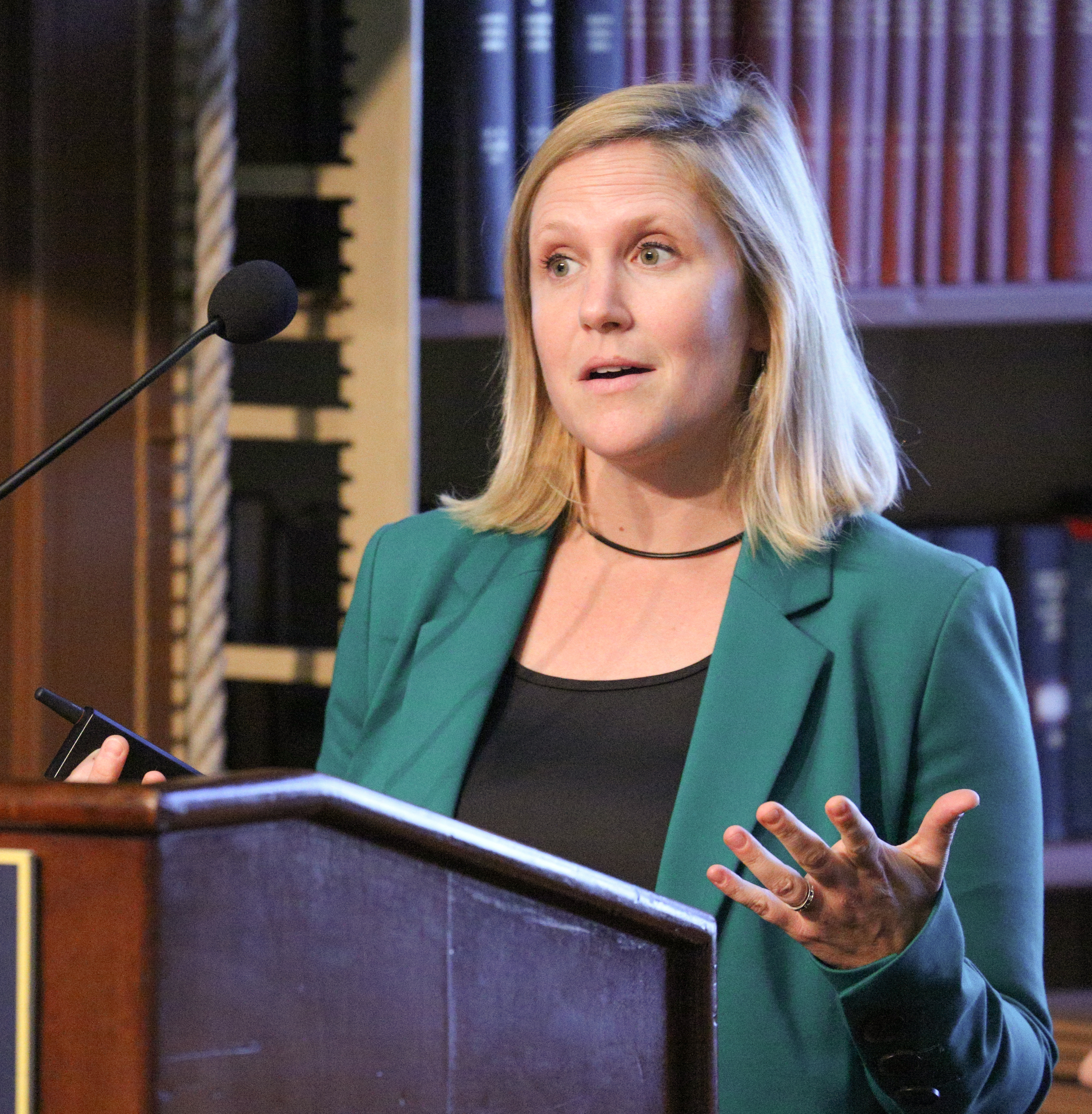
- Mendenhall in 2019
- Education: Northwestern University
- Scientific career
- Workplaces: Georgetown University
- Thesis: The VIDDA Syndemic : Distress and Diabetes in Social and Cultural Context (2012)

Emily Mendenhall (born 1982) is a medical anthropologist and Professor in the Edmund A. Walsh School of Foreign Service at Georgetown University. Her research considers syndemics, mental health, cultural idioms of distress, health politics and systems, migration and health, flourishing, and complex chronic conditions. She was awarded the George Foster Award for Practicing Medical Anthropology in 2017 from the Society for Medical Anthropology for her work on syndemics. In 2023, she received a Guggenheim Fellowship from the John Simon Guggenheim Memorial Foundation in recognition of her anthropological work on COVID-19.

Mendenhall has authored several books, including Syndemic Suffering: Social Distress, Depression, and Diabetes among Mexican Immigrant Women (2012, Routledge), Global Mental Health: Anthropological Perspectives (2015, Routledge, with Brandon Kohrt), Rethinking Diabetes: Entanglements with Trauma, Poverty, and HIV (2019, Cornell), Unmasked: COVID, Community, and the Case of Okoboji (2022, Vanderbilt), and Invisible Illness: A History, from Hysteria to Long Covid (California). In 2017 she led a series in The Lancet on syndemics, the theory of how and why social and health conditions travel together.

== Early life and education ==
Mendenhall was born and raised in Okoboji, Iowa. She attended Davidson College. She earned a Master of Public Health from the Hubert Department of Global Health at Emory University and later completed a PhD in anthropology at Northwestern University. Her thesis introduced the concept of the "VIDDA Syndemic", which comprises five overlapping issues: violence, immigration and isolation, depression, diabetes, and abuse (verbal, emotional, and sexual). In the book, she concluded that women's physical suffering could not be separated from their surrounding environment. This informed her later work, Rethinking Diabetes, which examines the global and local factors that transformed how diabetes was perceived.

Mendenhall completed a Fogarty Fellowship funded by the National Institutes of Health where she was posted at the Public Health Foundation of India in New Delhi. As the first anthropologist to hold this fellowship, she said, "Because I am an anthropologist, and not a doctor or epidemiologist, I am an example of Fogarty taking a risk. Syndemics is a way to bring us all together to have a conversation about how interactions matter so fundamentally to what health and illness mean." She also completed a postdoctoral fellowship at the University of the Witwatersrand.

== Research and career ==
Mendenhall is a professor at Georgetown University's Edmund A. Walsh School of Foreign Service. She authored a 2017 series in The Lancet on syndemics. In the opening to the series, she argued that "how we think about disease pathologies affects how we design policies and deliver care to those most affected by social and economic inequalities. Conventional frameworks in medicine and public health, such as comorbidity and multimorbidity, often overlook the effects of social, political, and ecological factors...the theory of syndemics improves on conventional frameworks in both theoretical and practical terms by illuminating how macro-level social factors promote disease clustering at the population level and impact disease pathologies at the individual level." She also conducted research in the United States, India, Kenya, and South Africa, focused on how diabetes and distress emerge and interact differently among low-income people facing healthcare challenges across very different contexts.

Additionally, Mendenhall has explored syndemics in Soweto, South Africa. Most of this work has focused on chronic illnesses (particularly type 2 diabetes, depression, breast cancer, and HIV), social challenges like stigma and how people manage living with multiple chronic conditions at once. She also conducted research documenting late-stage breast cancer diagnoses influenced by social and structural barriers. She showed that Black women living in Soweto were diagnosed with breast cancer too late for successful treatments and believed that the treatments (e.g. chemotherapy) were much worse than the cancer itself. She called for people to recognise the significance of social and structural drivers of stress.

During the COVID-19 pandemic, Mendenhall studied how people in northwest Iowa responded to COVID-19. She assessed how failures in state politics, a breakdown in negotiations, and lack of trust in science caused Okoboji to be declared a coronavirus hotspot. This work inspired her book, Unmasked, and was featured in an illustrated article in Sapiens.

Mendenhall has written extensively about Long COVID. She wrote about experiences of brain fog in Scientific American. She has explored how the medical system and society support people living with chronic conditions, from lupus to Lyme disease and long COVID.

== Awards and honors ==
- 2023 Guggenheim Fellowship

== Selected publications ==
- Singer, Merrill; Nicola Bulled; Bayla Ostrach; Mendenhall, Emily (2017). "Syndemics and the biosocial conception of health". The Lancet. 389 (10072): 941–950. doi:10.1016/s0140-6736(17)30003-x. PMID 28271845. Wikidata Q39167829.
- Mendenhall, Emily; Brandon A Kohrt; Norris, Shane; David Ndetei; Dorairaj Prabhakaran (2017). "Non-communicable disease syndemics: poverty, depression, and diabetes among low-income populations". The Lancet. 389 (10072): 951–963. doi:10.1016/s0140-6736(17)30402-6. PMC 5491333. PMID 28271846. Wikidata Q39167835.
- Mendenhall, Emily; Mary J De Silva; Charlotte Hanlon; et al. (2014). "Acceptability and feasibility of using non-specialist health workers to deliver mental health care: stakeholder perceptions from the PRIME district sites in Ethiopia, India, Nepal, South Africa, and Uganda". Social Science & Medicine. 118: 33–42. doi:10.1016/j.socscimed.2014.07.057. PMC 4167946. PMID 25089962. Wikidata Q34207184.

=== Books ===
- Mendenhall, Emily (2016). Syndemic suffering: social distress, depression, and diabetes among Mexican immigrant women. Advances in critical medical anthropology. London: Routledge. ISBN 978-1-61132-142-5.
- Mendenhall, Emily (2019). Rethinking diabetes: entanglements with trauma, poverty, and HIV. Ithaca [New York]: Cornell University Press. ISBN 978-1-5017-3831-9.
- Mendenhall, Emily (2022). Unmasked: covid, community, and the case of Okoboji. Nashville, Tennessee: Vanderbilt University Press. ISBN 978-0-8265-0454-8.
- Mendenhall, Emily (2026). Invisible Illness: A History, from Hysteria to Long Covid. Berkeley: University of California Press. ISBN 978-0-520-42152-3
