= Ida Susser =

South African-born American anthropologist

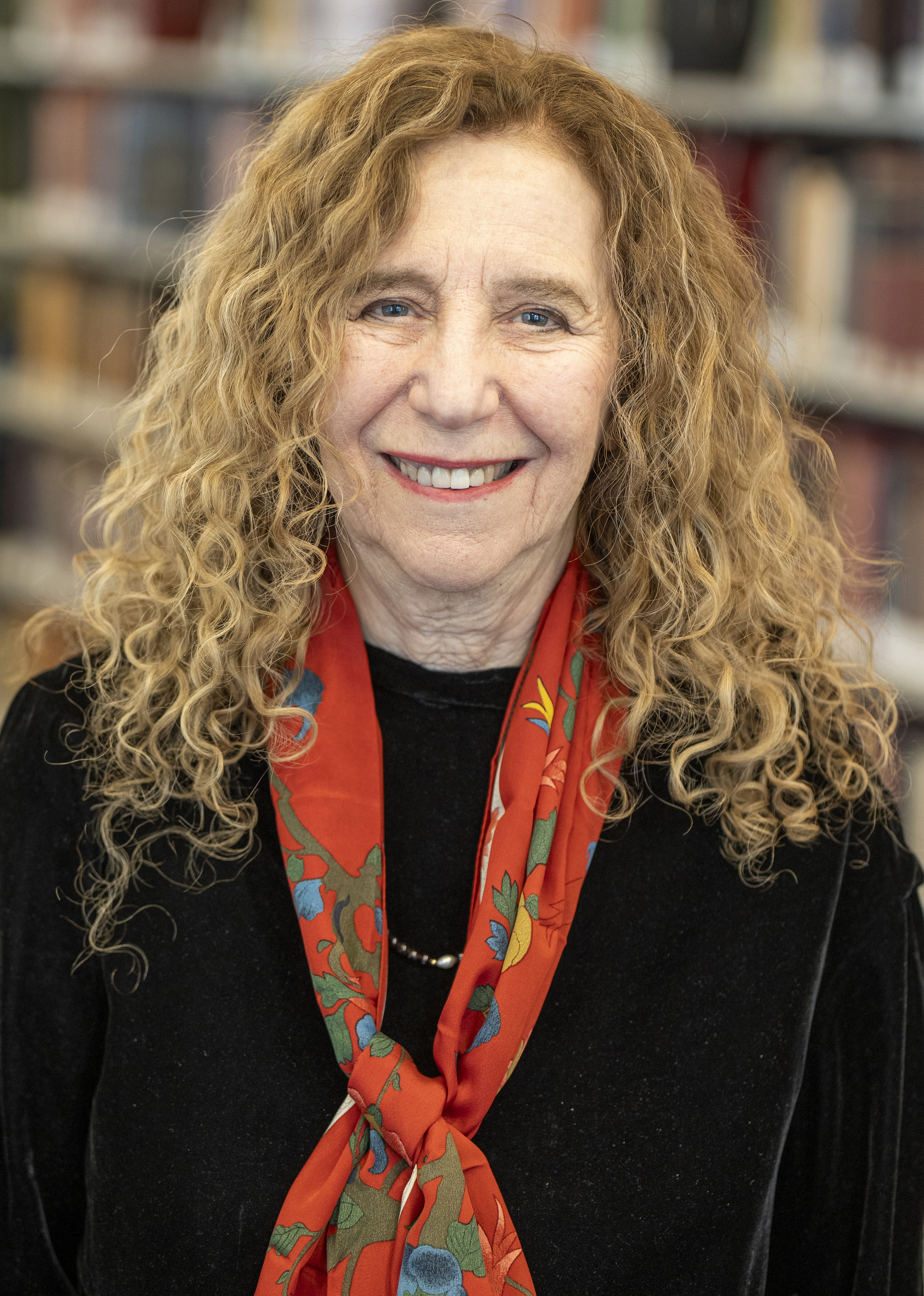
- Ida Susser, January 2026
- Born: July 6, 1950 (age 76)
- Occupations: anthropologist, scholar

Academic background
- Education: Columbia University (Ph.D. 1980); University of Chicago (M.A. 1974)
- Thesis: Poverty and Politics in a New York City Neighborhood (1980)

Academic work
- Discipline: Anthropologist
- Sub-discipline: Social anthropology, Cultural anthropology, Medical anthropology
- Institutions: Hunter College, CUNY Graduate Center

Ida Susser (6 July 1950) is a South African-born American anthropologist. Susser is a Distinguished Professor of Anthropology at Hunter College and the CUNY Graduate Center.

== Early life and education ==
Born in South Africa to Zena Stein and Mervyn Susser, both epidemiologists and anti-apartheid activists, Susser moved first to Manchester, UK in 1956, where her parents obtained faculty positions at Manchester University and later to New York City in 1965.

== Education ==
Susser earned a bachelor's degree from Barnard College in 1970, a masters degree from the University of Chicago in 1974, and a PhD from Columbia University in 1980, all in anthropology.

== Academic career ==
Susser has held faculty appointments at Case Western Reserve University, SUNY Old Westbury, and the City University of New York, where she was named Distinguished Professor in 2017. Susser served as Chair of the Department of Anthropology at Hunter College from 2012 to 2016.

Susser has also held several positions in professional organizations in anthropology. She is a founding president of the American Anthropological Association’s Society for the Anthropology of North America and a past president of the American Ethnological Society. She is also a co-founding editor of Anthropology Now and FocaalBlog, and served for a decade as the U.S. editor of Critique of Anthropology.

Susser is the founder and editor of the Social Transformations in American Anthropology Series at the NYU Press.

== Research ==
Susser's research interests span urban studies, medical anthropology, international health, political economy, gender studies, and social movements, with long-term ethnographic fieldwork in the United States, South Africa, Puerto Rico, France, and Spain.

=== Norman Street: Poverty and Politics in an Urban Neighborhood ===
Susser’s early ethnographic work focused on a working-class neighborhood in Greenpoint-Williamsburg during and after New York City’s 1975 fiscal crisis. This research culminated in her first book Norman Street, which examines social transformation under conditions of inequality, austerity, and neoliberal restructuring. In Norman Street, Susser argues that urban poverty and neighborhood decline are produced by political and economic decisions, challenging the culture of poverty explanations prevalent at the time. She shows how deindustrialization, austerity policies, and the retrenchment of municipal services reshaped everyday life for working-class residents.

Susser also argues that politics is embedded in everyday interactions with welfare officials, landlords, employers, and city agencies, and that neighborhood conflicts over housing, fire protection, and services are forms of class struggle, even when residents do not frame them in these terms. Far from being apathetic or disorganized, Susser shows how residents organize, cooperate, and protest to defend their neighborhood, even as their efforts are constrained by economic dependency, racial and ethnic divisions, and uneven access to political power. Susser shows that kinship, friendship, and mutual aid among women are essential survival strategies under conditions of poverty and also form the social infrastructure that makes political mobilization possible. At the same time, these networks are strained by welfare regulations, housing insecurity, and labor market instability.

Setha M. Low has called the book a landmark ethnography, marking the introduction of the political economy approach in urban anthropology.

=== AIDS, Sex and Culture: Global Politics and Survival in Southern Africa ===
In the 1990s and 2000s, Susser conducted extensive research on HIV/AIDS in Southern Africa, Puerto Rico, and the United States. Her book AIDS, Sex and Culture: Global Politics and Survival in Southern Africa analyzes the gendered and political dimensions of global health research, funding, and activism. The book argues that HIV/AIDS in southern Africa is not primarily a biomedical crisis but a political, economic, and gendered one, produced and intensified by globalization, neoliberal policy, and entrenched gender inequalities. While scientific knowledge and treatments exist, they repeatedly fail to protect women because prevention and care are designed without adequate attention to women’s lived social realities, including poverty, labor migration, unequal power in sexual relationships, caregiving burdens, and restrictions on reproductive and sexual autonomy. Susser argues that global health policies, particularly especially those shaped by the United States' funding priorities, ignore women’s needs, even as women bear a disproportionate burden from the virus in regard to infection, care, and social reproduction. Simultaneously, Susser emphasizes that women are not passive victims; they develop pragmatic, non-moralistic forms of “good sense” and collective resistance that point toward more democratic and effective responses to AIDS.

Anthropologists Setha Low and Sally Engle Merry cite the book as an example of "engaged anthropology," and the book is considered distinctive for its historical method and wide-ranging scope. In 2011 the book was awarded the Eileen Basker Memorial Prize by the Society for Medical Anthropology.

In addition to her scholarship, Susser is also engaged in AIDS activism. in 2006 Susser co-founded the ATHENA Network, an advocacy organization for women's and girls' human rights, gender equality, and leadership in response to HIV/AIDS, and serves as one of its steering committee members. In a 2015 Al Jazeera America op-ed, Susser argued that a study of daily antiretroviral pills and gels to prevent HIV in women in South Africa, published in the New England Journal of Medicine, failed not because of participants’ deceit or noncompliance but because its design overlooked the social, cultural, and behavioral realities of the women involved, underscoring that effective HIV prevention requires more than biomedical solutions alone. Susser has also published op-eds about the role of feminism in the advocating for microbicide treatment of AIDS, as well as the negative impact drugs patents and intellectual property regulations have on access to HIV/AIDS treatment.

=== The Yellow Vests and the Battle for Democracy: Taking to the Streets of Paris in the 21st Century ===
Susser’s recent research has focused on political polarization, protest movements, and struggles over the urban commons in Europe and the United States. She has conducted ethnographic work in New York, Paris and Barcelona examines street protests and democratic experimentation under austerity politics. In The Yellow Vests and the Battle for Democracy: Taking to the Streets of Paris in the 21st Century, Susser argues that the Yellow Vests movement constitutes an experiment in democratic renewal grounded in the practices of commoning, rather than simply reactions to austerity, neoliberalism, or political crisis.

== Bibliography ==
=== Books ===
- Susser, Ida (1982). Norman Street: Poverty and Politics in an Urban Neighborhood. New York, NY: Oxford University Press. ISBN 978-0195367317.
- Susser, Ida (2009). AIDS, Sex, and Culture : Global Politics and Survival in Southern Africa. Hoboken, NJ: Wiley-Blackwell. ISBN 978-1405155878.
- Susser, Ida (2026). The Yellow Vests and The Battle for Democracy: Taking to the Streets of Paris in the 21st Century. Milton Park: Routledge. ISBN 978-1032877938.

=== Edited volumes ===
- Baer, Hans A.; Singer, Merrill; Susser, Ida, eds. (1982). Medical Anthropology and the World System: A Critical Perspective. Westport, CT: Bergin & Garvey. ISBN 0-89789-424-3.
- Bond, George C.; Kreniske, John; Susser, Ida; Vincent, Joan, eds. (1997). AIDS in Africa and the Caribbean. New York, NY: Routledge. ISBN 978-0813328799.
- Susser, Ida; Patterson, Thomas C., eds. (2001). Cultural Diversity in the United States: A Critical Reader. Malden, MA: Blackwell Publishers. ISBN 0-631-22213-8.
- Susser, Ida, ed. (2002). The Castells Reader on Cities and Social Theory. Malden, MA: Blackwell Publishers. ISBN 0-631-21933-1.
- Schneider, Jane; Susser, Ida, eds. (2003). Wounded Cities: Destruction and Reconstruction in a Globalized World. New York, NY: Routledge. ISBN 9781859736883.
- Maskovsky, Jeff; Susser, Ida, eds. (2009). Rethinking America: The Imperial Homeland in the 21st Century. New York, NY: Routledge. ISBN 9781594513848.
- Nonini, Donald M.; Susser, Ida, eds. (2020). The Tumultuous Politics of Scale: Unsettled States, Migrants and Movements in Flux. New York, NY: Routledge. ISBN 9780367186241.
