= Syndemic =

Concept in epidemiology

Syndemics is the evaluation of how social and health conditions arise, in what ways they interact, and what upstream drivers may produce their interactions. The word is a blend of "synergy" and "epidemics". The idea of syndemics is that no disease exists in isolation and that often population health can be understood through a confluence of factors (such as climate change or social inequality) that produces multiple health conditions that afflict some populations and not others. Syndemics are not like pandemics (where the same social forces produce clustered conditions equally around the world); instead, syndemics reflect population-level trends within certain states, regions, cities, or towns.

A syndemic or synergistic epidemic is generally understood to be the aggregation of two or more concurrent or sequential epidemics or disease clusters in a population with biological interactions, which exacerbate the prognosis and burden of disease. The term was developed by Merrill Singer in the early 1990s to call attention to the synergistic nature of the health and social problems facing the poor and underserved. Syndemics develop under health disparity, caused by poverty, stress, climate, or structural violence and are studied by epidemiologists and medical anthropologists concerned with public health, community health and the effects of social conditions on health. The concept was translated from anthropology to a larger audience in 2017, with the publication of a Series on Syndemics in The Lancet, led by Emily Mendenhall.

The syndemic approach departs from the biomedical approach to diseases to diagnostically isolate, study, and treat diseases as distinct entities separate from other diseases and independent of social contexts.

== Definition ==
A syndemic is a synergistic epidemic. The term was developed by Merrill Singer in the mid-1990s, culminating in a 2009 textbook. Disease concentration, disease interaction, and their underlying social forces are the core concepts. Disease co-occurrence, with or without interactions, is known as comorbidity and coinfection. The difference between "comorbid" and "syndemic" is per Mustanski et al. "comorbidity research tends to focus on the nosological issues of boundaries and overlap of diagnoses, while syndemic research focuses on communities experiencing co-occurring epidemics that additively increase negative health consequences." It is possible for two afflictions to be comorbid, but not syndemic i.e., the disorders are not epidemic in the studied population, or their co-occurrence does not cause an interaction that then contributes to worsened health. Two or more diseases can be comorbid without interactions, or interaction occurs but it is beneficial, not deleterious. Syndemic theory seeks to draw attention to and provide a framework for the analysis of adverse disease interactions, including their causes and consequences for human life and well-being. Although the majority of this research has focused on HIV, an emerging body of work on syndemics has expanded to other co-occurring conditions.

== Syndemic methods: from historical archives to mathematical models ==
Methods for evaluating syndemics have been a focus on scholarship for deepening the application of what has largely served as theory to understand why and how social and health conditions cluster together, interact, and are driven by shared forces, from climate (such as escalation of heat, rain, drought, and events) to poverty (such as food insecurity, poor housing, lack of safety, and limited work opportunities). In 2022, Alexander Tsai (an epidemiologist), Emily Mendenhall (a medical anthropologist), and Timothy Newfield (a historian) teamed up on a Special Issue in Social Science and Medicine to explore the various methodological ways in which syndemics can be understood, interpreted, and evaluated through history. For instance, historical syndemics may be evaluated using archival data that is incomplete but provides a novel way of thinking about disease biography. This is exemplified by Dylann Atcher Proctor's historical work on gastrointestinal distress in Gabon using historical archives that had never yet been evaluated on their own or synergistically.

Ethnographic data provides a deeper understanding of how and why larger social forces produce disease clusters and interactions and are crucial for understanding "why" syndemics occur. Ethnographic insights have served as the bedrock of syndemic thinking since Merrill Singer's pioneering intellectual and practical work with the concept beginning in the 1990s. His first article based on ethnographic thinking about the SAVA Syndemic came from real time observations as the AIDS epidemic that unfolded in tandem with substance use amidst structural violence in urban America throughout the 1990s and early 2000s. Singer demonstrated how it was impossible to think about one condition without contextualizing the broader social, structural, and health contexts in which people lived. Discussion of ethnographic methods were detailed in Emily Mendenhall's books Syndemic Suffering and Rethinking Diabetes and is also exemplified in Mac Marshall's book Drinking Smoke.

The largest body of methodological scholarship has emerged around the utility of epidemiological data. Epidemiological data provides opportunities to investigate the synergistic ways in which diseases emerge and interact with social and health conditions. This latter method has been the focus of contention, particularly in dialogue between Alexander Tsai and Ronald Stall. Early epidemiological studies, for example, evaluated the ways in which social and health conditions co-occurred. Tsai argued that instead, there is a deeper need to interrogate how conditions syngistically interact to cause more adverse health conditions than the conditions would produce on their own. This has led to a slough of emergent research interrogating mathematical models that can take seriously how health conditions may cluster together and interact to affect the health and well-being of populations residing in a specific nation, region, city, or town. A particularly useful model based on the Soweto Syndemics study was published in Nature Human Behavior. In particular, spatial models for thinking through syndemic clusters, such as using GIS, are an emerging area of interest in syndemics research.

== Types of disease interaction ==
Diseases regularly interact and this interaction influences disease course, expression, severity, transmission, and diffusion. Interaction among diseases may be both indirect (changes caused by one disease that facilitate another through an intermediary) and direct (diseases act in direct tandem).

- One disease can assist the physical transmission of the microbe causing another disease, for example, genital-tract ulceration caused by syphilis allowing sexual transmission of HIV.
- One disease may enhance the virulence of another, as for example, herpes simplex virus co-infection exacerbates HIV infection with progression to AIDS, periodontal bacteria may enhance the virulence of herpesvirus, HIV-infected individuals are more susceptible to tuberculosis; As of 2011, the cause was not fully understood.
- Changes in biochemistry or damage to organ systems, as for example diabetes weakening the immune system, promotes the progression of another disease, SARS.
- A coinfection may open up multiple syndemic pathways. Lethal synergism between influenza virus and pneumococcus, causes excess mortality from secondary bacterial pneumonia during influenza epidemics. Influenza virus alters the lungs in ways that increase the adherence, invasion and induction of disease by pneumococcus, alters the immune response with weakened ability to clear pneumococcus or, alternately amplifying the inflammatory cascade.
- Direct interaction of diseases occurs in the case of genetic recombination among different pathogens, for instance between Avian sarcoma leukosis virus and Marek's disease virus (MDV) in domestic fowl. Both cancer-causing viruses are known to infect the same poultry flock, the same chicken, and, even the same anatomic cell. In coinfected cells, the retroviral DNA of the avian leukosis virus can integrate into the MDV genome, producing altered biological properties compared to those of the parental MDV. The frequency of gene reassortment among human pathogens is less clear than it is among the plant or animal species but of concern as animal diseases adapt to human hosts and as man new diseases comes into contact.
- When one disease diminishes or eradicates another it is a counter-syndemic disease interaction.
- The linkage also may not be clear, despite apparent syndemic interactions among diseases, as for example in type 2 diabetes mellitus and hepatitis C virus infection.

== Iatrogenic ==
The term iatrogenesis refers to adverse effects on health caused by medical treatment. This is possible if medical treatment or medical research creates conditions that increase the likelihood that two or more diseases come together in a population. For example, if gene splicing unites two pathogenic agents and the resulting novel organism infects a population. One study suggests the possibility of iatriogenic syndemics. During a randomized, double-blind clinical trial testing the efficacy of the prototype HIV vaccine called V520 there appeared to be an increased risk for HIV infection among the vaccinated participants. Notably, participants immune to the common cold virus adenovirus type 5 had a higher risk of HIV infection. The vaccine was created using a replication-defective version of Ad5 as a carrier, or delivery vector, for three synthetically produced HIV genes. On November 6, 2007, Merck & Co. announced that research had been stopped suspecting the higher rate of HIV infection among individuals in the vaccinated was because the vaccine lowered defenses against HIV.

== Examples ==
Various syndemics though not always labeled as such have been described in the literature, including:

- HIV/AIDS and food insecurity compromise an unrecognized syndemic axis in many resource-limited settings in sub-Saharan Africa
- SAVA syndemic (substance abuse, violence and AIDS,
- the VIDDA syndemic (violence, immigration/isolation, depression, diabetes, abuse)
- the hookworm, malaria and HIV/AIDS syndemic,
- the Chagas disease, rheumatic heart disease and congestive heart failure syndemic,
- the possible asthma and infectious disease syndemic,
- the malnutrition and depression syndemic,
- the TB, HIV and violence syndemic,
- the whooping cough, influenza, tuberculosis syndemic,
- the HIV incidence, substance use, mental health, childhood sexual abuse, and intimate partner violence syndemics
- the HIV and STD syndemic,
- the stress and obesity syndemic,
- the HIV infection, mental health and substance abuse syndemic.
- the built environment, physical inactivity and obesity/diabetes syndemic, which Prince Charles pointed out in January 2006, in a speech at the Enhancing the Healing Environment conference hosted by The Prince's Foundation for the Built Environment and The King's Fund, St James's Palace, London.
- HIV infection and opportunistic microbial infections and viral-caused malignancies like Kaposi's sarcoma
- periodontitis and herpes virus: bacteria of several different species (e.g., Porphyromonas gingivalis, Dialister pneumosintes, Prevotella intermedia) that adhere to and reproduce on tooth surfaces under the gum line multiply when bodily defenses are weakened by an HSV infection of the periodontium.
- HIV being transiently suppressed during an acute measles infection. Several potential mechanisms could be responsible. Measles virus infection causes lymphopenia, a reduction in the number of CD4+ T lymphocytes circulating in the blood. The low point occurs just prior to the onset of the characteristic skin rash. Within a month of this nadir, the number of lymphocytes returns to normal levels. The drop in HIV virus levels may be due to a lack of target CD4+ T cells in which they replicate, or measles virus may stimulate the production of proteins suppressing HIV replication, including the β-chemokines, CD8+ cell noncytotoxic anti-HIV response, and the cytokines IL-10 and IL-16. median plasma levels of RANTES, a chemokine that attracts immune system components like eosinophils, monocytes, and lymphocytes were higher in HIV-infected children with measles than in those without measles (Moss and co-workers).
- HIV suppression in tsutsugamuchi disease or scrub typhus, a mite-borne infection in Asia and Australia, but how this occurs is unclear.
- COVID-19 is a syndemic of SARS‑CoV‑2 coronavirus infection combined with an epidemic of non-communicable diseases, both inter-acting on a social substrate of poverty and inequality, according to Richard Horton in the Lancet Global Burden of Disease study 2020 (GBD 2020).
- COVID-19 vaccinations can be understood through a syndemic lens when low vaccination coverage, high prevalence of non-communicable diseases (NCDs), and significant socioeconomic disparities co-occur.

=== 19th century Native American ===
Contact between Native Americans and Europeans during the Columbian Exchange led to lethal syndemics within the Native American population due to diseases introduced which the Native Americans had not encountered before and had not built-up immunity to.

An example of a syndemic from the 19th century can be found on the reservations on which Native Americans were confined with the closing of the U.S. frontier. It is estimated that in 1860 there were well over 10 million bison living on the American Plains. By the early 1880s, the last of the great herds of bison upon which Plains Indian peoples like the Sioux were dependent as a food source were gone. At the same time, after the U.S. military's defeat at the Battle of the Little Bighorn in 1876, there was a concerted effort to beat the Sioux into total submission. Thus, in 1872, Secretary of the Interior Columbus Delano stated: "as they become convinced that they can no longer rely upon the supply of game for their support, they will return to the more reliable source of subsistence [i.e., farming]." As a result, they were forced to give up their struggle for an independent existence on their own lands and take up reservation life at the mercy of government authority. Treaties that were signed with the Sioux in 1868 and 1876 stipulated that they would be provided with government annuities and provisions in payment for sections of their land and with the expectation among federal representatives that the Sioux would become farmers on individually held plots of land. The Sioux found themselves confined on a series of small reservations where they were treated as a conquered people. Moreover, the government reneged on its promises, food was insufficient and of low quality. Black Elk, a noted Sioux folk healer, told his biographer: "There was hunger among my people before I went across the big water [to Europe in 1886], because the Wasichus [whites] did not give us all the food they promised in the Black Hills treaty... But it was worse when I came back [1889]. My people looked pitiful... We could not eat lies and there was nothing we could do." Under extremely stressful conditions, with inadequate diets, and as victims of overt racism on the part of the registration agents appointed to oversee Indian reserves, the Sioux confronted infectious disease from contact with whites. knowledge about the epidemiology of the Sioux from this period is limited, James Mooney, an anthropologist and representative of the Bureau of Indian Affairs sent to investigate a possible Sioux rebellion, described the health situation on the reservation in 1896: "In 1888 their cattle had been diminished by disease. In 1889, their crops were a failure ... Thus followed epidemics of measles, grippe [influenza], and whooping cough Pertussis, in rapid succession and with terrible fatal results..." Similarly, the Handbook of American Indians notes, "The least hopeful conditions in this respect prevail among the Dakota [Sioux] and other tribes of the colder northern regions, where pulmonary tuberculosis and scrofula are very common... Other more common diseases, are various forms of, bronchitis ...pneumonia, pleurisy, and measles in the young. Whooping cough is also met with." Indian children were removed to white boarding schools and diagnosed with a wide range of diseases, including tuberculosis, trachoma, measles, smallpox, whooping cough, influenza, and pneumonia.

The Sioux were victims of a syndemic of interacting infectious diseases including the 1889–1890 flu pandemic, inadequate diet, and stressful and extremely disheartening life conditions, including outright brutalization with events like the massacre at Wounded Knee in 1890 and the murder of their leader Sitting Bull. While the official mortality rate on the reservation was between one and two percent, the death rate was probably closer to 10 percent.

=== Influenza ===
There were three influenza pandemics during the 20th century that caused widespread illness, mortality, social disruption, and significant economic losses. These occurred in 1918, 1957, and 1968. In each case, mortality rates were determined primarily by five factors: the number of people who became infected, the virulence of the virus causing the pandemic, the speed of global spread, the underlying features and vulnerabilities of the most affected populations, and the effectiveness and timeliness of the prevention and treatment measures that were implemented.

The 1957 pandemic was caused by the Asian influenza virus (known as the H2N2 strain), a novel influenza variety to which humans had not yet developed immunities. The death toll of the 1957 pandemic is estimated to have been around two million globally, with approximately 70,000 deaths in the United States. A little over a decade later, the comparatively mild Hong Kong influenza pandemic erupted due to the spread of a virus strain (H3N2) that genetically was related to the more deadly form seen in 1957. The pandemic was responsible for about one million deaths around the world, almost 34,000 of which were in the United States. In both of these pandemics, death may not have been due only to the primary viral infection, but also to secondary bacterial infections among influenza patients; in short, they were caused by a viral/bacterial syndemic (but see Chatterjee 2007).

The worst of the 20th-century influenza pandemics was the 1918 pandemic, where between 20 and 40 percent of the world's population became ill and between 40 and 100 million people died. More people died of the so-called Spanish flu (caused by the H1N1 viral strain) pandemic in the single year of 1918 than during all four-years of the Black Death. The pandemic had devastating effects as disease spread along trade and shipping routes and other corridors of human movement until it had circled the globe. In India, the mortality rate reached 50 per 1,000 population. Arriving during the closing phase of World War I, the pandemic impacted mobilized national armies. Half of U.S. soldiers who died in the "Great War," for example, were victims of influenza. It is estimated that almost 3/4 of a million Americans died during the pandemic. In part, the death toll during the pandemic was caused by viral pneumonia characterized by extensive bleeding in the lungs resulting in suffocation. Many victims died within 48 hours of the appearance of the first symptom. It was not uncommon for people who appeared to be quite healthy in the morning to have died by sunset. Among those who survived the first several days, however, many died of secondary bacterial pneumonia. It has been argued that countless numbers of those who expired quickly from the disease were co-infected with tuberculosis, which would explain the notable plummet in TB cases after 1918.

=== Climate change ===
As a result of the floral changes produced by global warming, an escalation is occurring in global rates of allergies and asthma. Allergic diseases constitute the sixth leading cause of chronic illness in the United States, impacting 17 percent of the population. Asthma affects about 8 percent of the U.S. population, with rising tendency, especially in low income, ethnic minority neighborhoods in cities. In 1980 asthma affected only about three percent of the U.S. population according to the U.S. CDC. Asthma among children has been increasing at an even faster pace than among adults, with the percentage of children with asthma going up from 3.6 percent in 1980 to 9 percent in 2005. Among ethnic minority populations, like Puerto Ricans the rate of asthma is 125 percent higher than non-Hispanic white people and 80 percent higher than non-Hispanic black people. The asthma prevalence among American Indians, Alaska Natives and black people is 25 percent higher than in white people.

=== Air pollution ===
Increases in asthma rates have occurred despite improvements in air quality produced by the passage and enforcement of clean air legislation, such as the U.S. Clean Air Act of 1963 and the Clean Air Act of 1990. Existing legislation and regulation have not kept pace with changing climatic conditions and their health consequences. Compounding the problem of air quality is the fact that air-borne pollens have been found to attach themselves to diesel particles from truck or other vehicular exhaust floating in the air, resulting in heightened rates of asthma in areas where busy roads bisect densely populated areas, most notably in poorer inner-city areas.

For every elevation of 10 μg/m3 in particulate matter concentration in the air a six percent increase in cardiopulmonary deaths occurs according to research by the American Cancer Society. Exhaust from the burning of diesel fuel is a complex mixture of vapors, gases, and fine particles, including over 40 known pollutants like nitrogen oxide and known or suspected carcinogenic substances such as benzene, arsenic, and formaldehyde. Exposure to diesel exhaust irritates the eyes, nose, throat and lungs, causing coughs, headaches, light-headedness and nausea, while causing people with allergies to be more susceptible allergy triggers like dust or pollen. Many particles in disease fuel are so tiny they are able to penetrate deep into the lungs when inhaled. Importantly, diesel fuel particles appear to have even greater immunologic effects in the presence of environmental allergens than they do alone. "This immunologic evidence may help explain the epidemiologic studies indicating that children living along major trucking thoroughfares are at increased risk for asthmatic and allergic symptoms and are more likely to have respiratory dysfunction." according to Robert Pandya and co-workers.

The damaging effects of diesel fuel pollution go beyond a synergistic role in asthma development. Exposure to a combination of microscopic diesel fuel particles among people with high blood cholesterol (i.e., low-density lipoprotein, LDL or "bad cholesterol") increases the risk for both heart attack and stroke above levels found among those exposed to only one of these health risks. According to André Nel, Chief of Nanomedicine at the David Geffen School of Medicine at UCLA, "When you add one plus one, it normally totals two... But we found that adding diesel particles to cholesterol fats equals three. Their combination creates a dangerous synergy that wreaks cardiovascular havoc far beyond what's caused by the diesel or cholesterol alone." Experimentation revealed that the two mechanisms worked in tandem to stimulate genes that promote cell inflammation, a primary risk for hardening and blockage of blood vessels (atherosclerosis ) and, as narrowed arteries collect cholesterol deposits and trigger blood clots, for heart attacks and strokes as well.

A Note on Mathematical Models

A mathematical model is a simplified representation using mathematical language to describe natural, mechanical or social system dynamics. Epidemiological modelers unite several types of information and analytic capacity, including: 1) mathematical equations and computational algorithms; 2) computer technology; 3) epidemiological knowledge about infectious disease dynamics, including information about specific pathogens and disease vectors; and 4) research data on social conditions and human behavior. Mathematical modelling in epidemiology is now being applied to syndemics.

For example, modelling to quantify the syndemic effects of malaria and HIV in sub-Saharan Africa based on research in Kisumu, Kenya researchers found that 5% of HIV infections (or 8,500 cases of HIV since 1980) in Kisumu are the result of the higher HIV infectiousness of malaria-infected HIV patients. Additionally, their model attributed 10% of adult malaria episodes (or almost one million excess malaria infections since 1980) to the greater susceptibility of HIV infected individuals to malaria. Their model also suggests that HIV has contributed to the wider geographic spread of malaria in Africa, a process previously thought to be the consequence primarily of global warming. Modelling offers an enormously useful tool for anticipating future syndemics, including eco-syndemic, based on information about the spread of various diseases across the planet and the consequent co-infections and disease interactions that will result.

PopMod is a longitudinal population tool developed in 2003 that models distinct and possibly interacting diseases. Unlike other life-table population models, PopMod is designed to not assume the statistical independence of the diseases of interest. The PopMod has several intended purposes, including describing the time evolution of population health for standard demographic purposes (such as estimating healthy life expectancy in a population), and providing a standard measure of effectiveness for health interventions and cost-effectiveness analysis. PopMod is used as one of the standard tools of the World Health Organization's (WHO) CHOICE (Choosing Interventions that are Cost-Effective) program, an initiative designed to provide national health policymakers in the WHO's 14 epidemiological sub-regions around the world with findings on a range of health intervention costs and effects.

== Syndemics Scholars ==
1. Merrill Singer
2. Emily Mendenhall
3. Ronald Stall
4. Hans Baer
5. Alexander Tsai
6. Steven Saphran
7. Kevin Mayer
8. Bayla Ostrach
9. Nicola Bulled
10. Brian Mustanski
11. Emmanuel Peprah
12. Sarah Willen

== Future research ==
First, there is a need for studies that examine the processes by which syndemics emerge, the specific sets of health and social conditions that foster multiple epidemics in a population and how syndemics function to produce specific kinds of health outcomes in populations. Second, there is a need to better understand processes of interaction between specific diseases with each other and with health-related factors like malnutrition, structural violence, discrimination, stigmatization, and toxic environmental exposure that reflect oppressive social relationships. There is a need to identify all of the ways, directly and indirectly, that diseases can interact and have, as a result, enhanced impact on human health. Third there is a need for the development of an eco-syndemic understanding of the ways in which global warming contributes to the spread of diseases and new disease interactions. There is a need for a better understanding of how public health systems and communities can best respond to and limit the health consequences of syndemics. Systems are needed to monitor the emergence of syndemics and to allow early medical and public health responses to lessen their impact. Systematic ethno-epidemiological surveillance with populations subject to multiple social stressors must be one component of such a monitoring system.

== See also ==
- Endemic
- List of epidemics
- List of human diseases associated with infectious pathogens
