= Marcia Wright =

American historian

- Occupation: Professor

Academic background
- Education: London University (PhD)

Academic work
- Discipline: African Studies
- Sub-discipline: social, ecological, and public health history of Africa
- Institutions: Columbia University

Marcia Wright is an American historian and professor emerita of history at Columbia University in New York City. She taught history at Columbia from 1966 to 2008. Wright was the first woman to be hired by Columbia as an assistant professor of history. Her work centers on the social, ecological, and public health history of Africa.

Wright graduated with her bachelor's degree, from Wellesley College in 1957, before moving on to Yale University, where she received her master's degree in 1958. She obtained her Ph.D. from London University in 1966.

== Selected publications ==
- German Missions in Tanganyika, 1891-1941, (Oxford, Clarendon, 1971)
- African Women and the Law: Historical Perspectives, co-edited with Margaret Jean Hay (Boston, 1982)
- Women's Health and Apartheid : the Health of Women and Children and the Future of Progressive Primary Health Care in Southern Africa, co-edited with Zena Stein & Jean Scandlyn (New York: Columbia University Press, 1988)
- Strategies of Slaves and Women in East-Central Africa. (New York, Barber, 1993)

=== Articles and book chapters ===
- "Life and Technology in Everyday Life: Reflections on the Career of a Master Smelter in Ufipa, Tanzania," Journal of African Cultural Studies, 15/1 (2002)
- "An Old Nationalist in New Nationalist Times: Donald Siwale and the State in Zambia: 1948-1963," Journal of Southern African Studies, 23/2 (1997)
- "Maji Maji: Prophecy & Historiography," in Revealing Prophets: Prophecy in Eastern African History, edited by David Anderson & Douglas H. Johnson (London: James Currey, 1995)
- "Autobiographies, histoires de vie et biographies de femmes africaines: des textes militants," Cahiers d'Etudes Africaines, 28/109 (1988)
- "Tambalika: Perspectives on a Colonial Magistrate in Central Africa," African Affairs, 85 (Jan 1986)
- "Technology, Marriage and Women's Work in the History of Maize-Growers in Mazabuka, Zambia: A Reconnaissance," Journal of Southern African Studies,10 (Oct 1983)
- "Gender, Women, and Power in Africa, 1750 - 1914," chpt. 25 of A Companion to Global Gender History, Second Edition, edited by Teresa A. Meade & Merry E. Wiesner-Hanks (2020)
