= Barbara Rylko-Bauer =

American anthropologist

Barbara Rylko-Bauer (born 1950) is a medical anthropologist and author who lives in the United States. She is an adjunct associate professor at Michigan State University's Department of Anthropology. She was born in 1950 in Frankfurt am Main, Germany, and emigrated with her parents to the United States that same year.

== Career ==
Rylko-Bauer received an undergraduate degree in microbiology from the University of Michigan, and in 1985 was awarded a PhD in anthropology from the University of Kentucky. Her interests include medical anthropology, applied anthropology, social suffering, health care inequities in the US, health and human rights, narrative analysis, and the Holocaust. She has published various articles, chapters, and books on these topics. She has served as a contributing editor to the American Anthropology Association's Anthropology News for the Society for Medical Anthropology (1991–1994) and for the AAA Committee on Practicing, Applied, and Public Interest Anthropology (2013–2014), as book review editor for Medical Anthropology Quarterly (1994–2000), and on several committees for the Society for Applied Anthropology.

Her most recent work focuses on the intersection of health and violence and includes a volume, Global Health in Times of Violence, edited in collaboration with Linda Whiteford and Paul Farmer. She is the author of a biography-memoir, A Polish Doctor in the Nazi Camps: My Mother's Memories of Imprisonment, Immigration, and a Life Remade, which focuses on her mother's experiences as a Polish prisoner-doctor in Nazi slave labor camps and her efforts to rebuild her life, first as a refugee doctor in Germany, and later as an immigrant to the United States.

== Awards ==
In 2003, Barbara Rylko-Bauer won the Rudolph Virchow Award for her work with Paul Farmer.
