= Merrill Singer =

Medical anthropologist (1950–2025)

Merrill Singer (October 6, 1950 – May 3, 2025) was an American medical anthropologist and professor emeritus in Anthropology at the University of Connecticut and in Community Medicine at the University of Connecticut Health Center. He was best known for his research on substance abuse, HIV/AIDS, syndemics, health disparities, and minority health.

== Background ==
Singer studied anthropology at California State University, Northridge (Master of Arts, Anthropology, 1975) and completed a PhD in anthropology at the University of Utah in 1979. He held a National Institute on Alcohol Abuse and Alcoholism Postdoctoral Fellowship in the Department of Psychiatry, George Washington University (1979–80) and another at the University of Connecticut School of Medicine from 1982 to 1983.

He was a researcher, rising to associate director, at the Hispanic Health Council in Hartford, Connecticut from 1982 to 2007, and moved to the University of Connecticut in 2007, becoming Professor in 2008 and retiring in the late 2010s.

== Scholarship ==
As Director of the Center for Community Health Research at the Hispanic Health Council, he helped to develop the theoretical perspective within medical anthropology known as "critical medical anthropology". Singer also developed the public health concepts of "syndemics" and "oppression illness". Most recently, he has published a number of articles on "pluralea".

The first of these terms refers to the clustering of diseases in populations and the biological interaction of diseases in individual bodies. Moreover, the term syndemics also points to the determinant importance of social conditions in disease concentrations, interactions, and health consequences. In syndemics, the interaction of diseases or other adverse health conditions commonly arises because of adverse social conditions (e.g., poverty, exploitation, stigmatization, oppressive social relationships) that put socially devalued groups at heightened risk. The term oppression illness refers to the internalization of social discrimination and the health consequences of coming to accept one does not deserve to be healthy. The term pluralea refers to the adverse intersection of environmental crises and their health effects.

In his work on alcohol and drug use, Singer explains that all drugs are commodities and draws attention to social constructions of legitimate or legal and illegitimate or illegal drugs. In his book Drugging the Poor: Legal and Illegal Drugs and Social Inequality, Singer notes that all drugs are forms of self-medicating, and that distinctions of legal or illegal serve to reinforce social hierarchies and inequalities. Furthermore, Singer argues that drug use among the poor is a type of self-medicating in response to the pressures of being poor. Responding to ways illegal drug users are vilified, Singer argues that by using language of blame to describe drug users as responsible for deteriorating urban centers, “attention is diverted from the role of class inequality as a source of social misery.”

Singer has been the principal investigator on a series of U.S. federal and foundation funded drinking, drug use, and AIDS prevention grants since 1984. Recent grants include:

- Community-based HIV Education Research Program for Diverse Racial, Ethnic and Disadvantaged Groups. (National Institute of Mental Health, 2010–2015)
- Surveillance of emergent drug use trends (Centers for Disease Control)
- Sexual communication and risk among inner city young adults (Centers for Disease Control)
- Assessing the implementation of oral HIV testing among injection drug users in Rio de Janeiro, Brazil (National Institute on Drug Abuse)
- Ethical issues in research with active drug users (National Institute on Drug Abuse)
- Evaluation of the Work and Learn Model in Connecticut (DCF)

Additionally, he was co-editor with Pamela Erickson of the book series Advances in Critical Medical Anthropology with Left Coast Press.

== Recognition ==
- Society for Medical Anthropology Career Award (2017)
- Solon T. Kimball Award for Public and Applied Anthropology from the American Anthropological Association (2010)
- Selected as the first recipient of the Practicing Anthropology Award by the Society for Medical Anthropology in 2004
- Career Recognition Award from the Society for the Anthropology of North America in 2005
- AIDS and Anthropology Paper Prizes and the Rudolf Virchow Award through the Society for Medical Anthropology
- Rudolf Virchow Prize, Critical Anthropology of Health Caucus, Society for Medical Anthropology (1991)

== Personal life and family ==
Singer is the father of two children, Jake H. Singer (also known as Jacob Hillis Singer), an industrial designer, and Elyse Ona Singer, who is currently an assistant professor in the Department of Anthropology at the University of Oklahoma.

Singer died at age 75.

== Selected publications ==
- Merrill Singer, Lani Davison and Fuat Yalin (eds.). Alcohol Use and Abuse Among Hispanic Adolescents. Hartford, CT: Hispanic Health Council, 1987.
- Hans Baer and Merrill Singer. African American Religion in the Twentieth Century: Diversity in Protest and Accommodation. Knoxville, TN: University of Tennessee Press, 1992; 2nd edition 2002.
- Ralph Bolton and Merrill Singer (eds.). Rethinking AIDS Prevention: Cultural Approaches. New York: Gordon and Breach Science Publishers, 1992.
- Merrill Singer and Hans Baer. Critical Medical Anthropology. Amiytyville, New York: Baywood Publishing Co., 1995.
- Merrill Singer (ed.). The Political Economy of AIDS. Amityville, New York: Baywood Publishing Co., 1997.
- Hans Baer, Merrill Singer and Ida Susser. Medical Anthropology and the World System. Westport, CT: Greenwood Publishing Co., 1997; 2nd Edition 2003; 3rd edition 2013.
- Patricia Marshall, Merrill Singer, and Michael Clatts (eds.). Integrating Cultural, Observational, and Epidemiological Approaches in the Prevention of Drug Abuse and HIV/AIDS. Rockville, MD: National Institute on Drug Abuse, 1999.
- Jean Schensul, M. LeCompte, Robert Trotter, E. Cromley, and Merrill Singer. Mapping Social Networks, Spatial Data and Hidden Populations. Book 4, The Ethnographer's Toolkit. Walnut Creek, CA: Altamira Press, 1999.
- Margaret LeCompte, Jean Schensul, Margaret Weeks and Merrill Singer. Researcher Roles and Research Partnerships. Books 6, The Ethnographer's Toolkit. Walnut Creek, CA: Altamira Press, 1999.
- Yun, Wu, Wang Qitian, Cong Rihui, Jianghong Li, Ian Newman, Merrill Singer, Christopher Bates, and Michael Duke (eds.). New Advancements in Preventive Medicine: Textbook of Continuing Medical Education of the Inner Mongolia Autonomous Region. Hohhot, Inner Mongolia: Yuanfang Press, 2002.
- Arachu Castro and Merrill Singer (eds.). Unhealthy Health Policy: A Critical Anthropological Examination. Walnut Creek, CA: Altamira Press, 2004.
- Merrill Singer. Something Dangerous: Emergent and Changing Illicit Drug Use and Community Health. Long Grove, IL: Waveland Press, 2006.
- Merrill Singer (ed.). New Drugs on the Street: Changing Patterns of Illicit Consumption. New York: Haworth Press, 2005.
- Benjamin P. Bowser, Ernest Quimby and Merrill Singer (eds.). Communities Assessing Their AIDS Epidemics: Results of the Rapid Assessment of HIV/AIDS in U.S. Cities. Lanham, Maryland: Lexington Books, 2006.
- Merrill Singer. The Face of Social Suffering: Life History of a Street Drug Addict. Long Grove, IL: Waveland Press, 2007.
- Merrill Singer and Hans Baer. Introducing Medical Anthropology: A Discipline in Action. Lanham, MD: Altamira Press, 2007; 2nd edition 2011.
- Merrill Singer and Hans Baer (eds.). Killer Commodities: Public Health and the Corporate Production of Harm. AltaMira/Rowman Littlefield Publishers, Inc., 2008.
- Merrill Singer. Drugging the Poor: Legal and Illegal Drug Industries and the Structuring of Social Inequality. Long Grove, IL: Waveland Press, 2008.
- Merrill Singer. Drugs and Development: Global Impact on Sustainable Growth and Human Rights. Long Grove, IL: Waveland Press, 2008.
- Hans Baer and Merrill Singer. Global Warming and the Political Ecology of Health: Emerging Crises and Systemic Solutions. Walnut Creek, CA: Left Coast Press, 2009.
- Merrill Singer. Introduction to Syndemics: A Systems Approach to Public and Community Health. San Francisco, CA: Jossey-Bass, 2009.
- Merrill Singer and G. Derrick Hodge (eds.). The War Machine and Global Health. Malden, MA: AltaMira, 2010.
- J. Bryan Page and Merrill Singer. Comprehending Drug Use: Ethnographic Research at the Social Margins. Rutgers University Press, 2010.
- Merrill Singer and Pamela Erickson, (eds.). The Companion to Medical Anthropology. Wiley-Blackwell, 2011.
- Merrill Singer and Pamela Erickson. Global Health: An Anthropological Perspective. Waveland, 2013.
- Merrill Singer, J Bryan Page. Social Value of Drug Addicts: Uses of the Useless. Left Coast Press, 2014.
- Merrill Singer. Anthropology of Infectious Disease. Left Coast Press, 2015. Routledge, 2016.
- Merrill Singer (ed.). A Companion to the Anthropology of Environmental Health. Wiley Blackwell, 2016.
- Shir Lerman, Bayla Ostrach and Merrill Singer (eds.). Foundations of Biosocial Health: Stigma and Illness Interactions and Stigma Syndemics. Lanham, MD: Lexington Books, 2017. ISBN 978-1-4985-5211-0
- Bayla Ostrach, Shir Lerman and Merrill Singer (eds.). Stigma Syndemics: New Directions in Biosocial Health. Lanham, MD: Lexington Books, 2017. ISBN 1498552145
- Merrill Singer and Rebecca Allen. Social Justice and Medical Practice: Life History of a Physician of Social Medicine. London: Routledge, 2017. (a book about Paul Farmer)
