= Vita: Life in a Zone of Social Abandonment =

2005 Brazilian ethnography book

Vita: Life in a Zone of Social Abandonment is a 2005 ethnographic study of Vita, a Brazilian center for those abandoned by their families, written by anthropologist João Biehl during his fieldwork there from 1995–2003. Vita combines the social-science genres of life history and ethnography through its focus on one resident of Vita, Catarina, her navigation of the Brazilian medical system, and her abandonment by her family. Biehl interweaves narration about Vita with excerpts from Catarina's writing in her journal and "dictionary", which he explains are her attempt to explain how her social death brought her to Vita and to create new social meaning for herself.

The book is illustrated with photographs of Vita by Torben Eskerod. Biehl was granted the 2007 Margaret Mead Award for writing Vita.
