= Mervyn Susser =

South African doctor and epidemiologist

Mervyn Wilfred Susser
- Born: 26 September 1921; Johannesburg, South Africa
- Died: 14 August 2014 (aged 92); Hastings-on-Hudson, New York, United States
- Occupations: Activist, doctor, and epidemiologist
- Employer: Columbia University Mailman School of Public Health
- Title: Sergievsky Professor of Epidemiology Emeritus
- Spouse: Zena Stein
- Children: Ida Susser
- Parent(s): Solomon Susser; Ida Rose Son

Mervyn Wilfred Susser (26 September 1921 – 14 August 2014) was a South African activist, doctor and epidemiologist.

His career was closely interwoven with that of his wife, Zena Stein. He is considered as one of the pioneers of epidemiology in the twentieth century.

== Biography ==
Mervyn Wilfred Susser was born on 26 September 1921 in Johannesburg, South Africa to Solomon and Ida Rose (née Son) Susser. His family moved to Mokopane in Limpopo Province, where he learned to track game in the wild. His mother committed suicide when he was a young boy. His parents enrolled him in a Catholic girls' school because it was the best education available before later switching to an unspecified boys' school several hundred miles away.

Susser married Zena Stein in 1949. Susser and Stein had three children: Ezra Susser, Ruth Susser and Ida Susser.

Susser, Stein and colleagues began their careers at a clinic in Alexandra Township, where they developed ties with members of the anti-Apartheid Movement including Joe Slovo, Ahmed Kathrada, Walter Sisulu and Nelson Mandela.

In this work they were influenced and mentored by Sidney Kark. In 1955, Susser and Stein left South Africa for political reasons, taking positions at Manchester University. While there the couple published a paper on the epidemiology of peptic ulcers and Susser coauthored an early textbook on Medical Sociology, among other contributions.

In 1965, Susser and Stein moved to Columbia University to lead the Division of Epidemiology. Ideas from a series of lectures given at Columbia were published in the book Causal Thinking in the Health Sciences. At Columbia, Susser founded the Gertrude H. Sergievsky Center, where he was named a chair.

From 1992 through 1998, Susser served as editor-in-chief of the American Journal of Public Health.

Towards the end of their careers, Susser and Stein became increasingly concerned about the HIV epidemic both in New York and in South Africa. They helped to organise a conference in Maputo in April 1990, which aimed to alert the African National Congress about the HIV epidemic in South Africa, sadly with limited effect. Susser, Stein and colleagues, worked on building scientific capacity in Southern Africa to deal with the HIV epidemic and Susser and Stein served as early directors at the Africa Centre for Health and Population Studies, a research centre in Northern KwaZulu-Natal.

He died on 14 August 2014 in Hastings-on-Hudson, New York.

== Legacy ==
On learning of his death, aged 92, Section27 issued the following statement:

His contribution to the fight against the HIV pandemic cannot be overstated. Dr Susser served as the joint director of the newly founded Africa Centre for Population and Reproductive Health Research in Kwazulu-Natal with his wife Dr Zena Stein in 1999. Mervyn and Zena were instrumental in highlighting the possible impact of the HIV pandemic in South Africa from the late 1980s. He worked alongside Dr. Salim (Slim) Abdool Karim to submit the first successful application to Fogarty in 1993 which sought to build strategic, sustainable scientific capacity to enhance the response to the HIV/AIDS epidemic in South Africa, Lesotho, Namibia and Swaziland.
