= Culture, Medicine and Psychiatry =

- Discipline: Medical and psychiatric anthropology, cross-cultural psychiatry
- Language: English
- Edited by: Atwood D. Gaines

Publication details
- History: 1977-present
- Publisher: Springer Science+Business Media
- Frequency: Quarterly
- Impact factor: 1.5 (2023)

Standard abbreviations
- ISO 4: Cult. Med. Psychiatry

Indexing
- CODEN: CMPSD2
- ISSN: 0165-005X (print); 1573-076X (web)
- LCCN: 79642232
- OCLC no.: 03375343

Links
- Journal homepage; Online access

Culture, Medicine and Psychiatry is a cross-cultural peer-reviewed medical journal published quarterly by Springer Science+Business Media.

== History ==
The journal was established in 1977 by Arthur Kleinman (Harvard University), who was editor-in-chief until 1986. Kleinman was succeeded by Byron Good (Harvard University), with Mary-Jo DelVecchio Good (Harvard University) serving as co-editor from 1992 through 2004. In 2004, Anne Becker (Harvard Medical School) and Peter J. Guarnaccia (Rutgers University), became co-editors-in-chief and served until 2007. They were succeeded in 2007 by Atwood D. Gaines (Case Western Reserve University), who brought on Managing Editor Brandy L Schillace (Case Western Reserve University). At that time, a range of new categories of scholarly contributions were introduced (Circumstantial Deliveries, Illness Narratives, Communiqués, Opinions, and Cultural Case Studies), in addition to the regular research articles. The scope of the journal was also expanded to include not only the social sciences of medicine but also the histories and philosophies of medicine and science and bioethics. In addition, the journal hosted a medical humanities special issue in December 2012 and continues to seek medical history and medical humanities works in addition to other related content. In 2019, Rebecca J. Lester (Washington University in St. Louis) assumed the role of editor-in-chief.

== Scope ==
The journal nowadays describes itself as an "international and interdisciplinary forum for the publication of work in the fields of medical and psychiatric anthropology, cross-cultural psychiatry, and associated cross-societal and clinical epidemiological studies".

== Abstracting and indexing ==
The journal is abstracted and indexed in:

- Social Sciences Citation Index
- PubMed/MEDLINE
- Scopus
- PsycINFO
- EMBASE
- EBSCO databases
- Abstracts in Anthropology
- Academic OneFile
- Academic Search
- Current Contents/Social & Behavioral Sciences
- EMCare
- International Bibliography of Book Reviews
- International Bibliography of Periodical Literature
- International Bibliography of the Social Sciences

According to the Journal Citation Reports, the journal has a 2011 impact factor of 1.288.
