= CD8+ cell noncytotoxic anti-HIV response =

Apparent anti-HIV innate immune response

CD8+ cell noncytotoxic anti-HIV response appears to be an anti-HIV innate immune response because it can be observed in vitro with CD8+ cells from unexposed and uninfected healthy individuals.

The presence of a CD8+ cell noncytotoxic anti-HIV response (CNAR) was first reported in 1986 by researchers in the laboratory of Dr. Jay Levy at the University of California San Francisco (UCSF). It was recognized that CD8+ cells from HIV-infected individuals can suppress HIV replication without directly killing the infected cells.

CNAR appears to be mediated by a CD8+ cell anti-HIV factor (CAF) that has not yet been identified. Other soluble factors can act against HIV including the β-chemokines.
