= Rudolf Virchow Award =

Annual American award in anthropology

The Rudolf Virchow Awards are annual American awards in anthropology.

== About the Award ==
The Rudolf Virchow Awards are given by the Critical Anthropology for Global Health Study Group, a special interest group of Society for Medical Anthropology. The professional award honors an article and the graduate and undergraduate student awards, a paper written in the spirit of Rudolf Virchow, that is deemed by the judges to best reflect, extend or advance critical perspectives in medical anthropology. These are materialist approaches that emphasize the social and political economic nature of health, disease and healing, and which embrace both micro and macro perspectives.

Rudolf Virchow, a German physician writing during the 1800s, was a key founder of social medicine. In addition to writing in the areas of anthropology and medical science, his contributions to social medicine centered on his recognition of the multiple interacting factors, particularly social factors, that produce disease and illness. He argued that the difficult circumstances and deprivations of the working class increase susceptibility to disease as well as to higher mortality rates. Virchow also recognized the political and material circumstances that inhibited disease prevention efforts and viewed advocacy as an essential part of medical research. He was perhaps most articulate about the limitations of medical science to improving health in the absence of material security. Virchow viewed the state as responsible for providing that security through employment of those who could work. His appreciation for the complex relationship among health, medicine and society are remembered in his statement, “Medicine is a social science, and politics is nothing more than medicine in larger scale”.

== Criteria and Eligibility ==
The professional award is given annually for an article, singly or co-authored, and published during the previous year in either a peer-reviewed journal (either a print or on-line journal) or an edited volume. This prize will be given to professionals, or to graduate students who have singly or co-authored the published their work.

The graduate student award will be granted to a paper that was written in the prize year or the preceding year and that has not been subjected to the process of editorial review. Papers that have been submitted to a journal or edited volume, but that have not yet benefited from review, may be included in this category. Theses and dissertations cannot be accepted. However, a summary of a thesis or a dissertation (no greater than about 30 pages) that can stand on its own, or a chapter that has been revised and can also stand on its own, will be considered for this award. Papers from students who have graduated after the paper was written will still be accepted under this category. Only papers, not interactive media, will be considered for this award.

The undergraduate student award will be given to a paper that was written the prize year or the preceding year while the student was still an undergraduate. Theses will not be accepted. However, a shortened version (up to about 30 pages) of the thesis (or a chapter from the thesis) that has been revised to stand on its own will be considered for this award. Only papers, not interactive media, will be considered at this time.

== Past winners ==
- 2025 - Professional Award: Tali Ziv - “When you leave out the door”: The streets, Medicaid, and boundary spaces of healthcare in urban poverty”
- 2025 - Graduate Prize: Randall C. Burson II - “Health care as a territorial matter: plural medical practice across the borders of settler states”
- 2025 - Undergraduate Prize: Dhruvi Banerjee - “The humanity in neurodegenerative care”
- 2024 - Professional Award: Ting Hui Lau - “The afterlife of “doing medicine”: Birth planning, chronic illness, and regeneration among the Lisu on the China–Myanmar border”
- 2024 - Graduate Prize: Aaron Su - “The (Im)possibility of Indigenous Politics: Collaborative Medical Design and the Limits of Settler Democracy in Taiwan”
- 2024 - Undergraduate Prize: Nada Dalati - “Radical imaginaries: An anthropology of Black and doula spaces in Los Angeles”
- 2023 - Professional Award: Brianna Simmons and Jennifer L Syvertsen - “Learning from women who trade sex in Kenya about the antiblackness of Global Health”
- 2023 - Graduate Prize: Mayssa Rekhis - “No place for those who suffer: Surviving Trauma in Exile and the integration-conundrum”
- 2023 - Undergraduate Prize: Sarah Brown - “A World Opens to you: In and Out of the Clinical Gaze in Tijuana Migrant Healthcare”
- 2022 - Professional Award: Jessica Hardin - “Life Before Vegetables: Nutrition, Cash, and Subjunctive Health in Samoa”
- 2022 - Graduate Prize: Xisai Song - “A Rich People’s Disease’: Rural Migrant Workers and Structural Debilitation in China”
- 2022 - Undergraduate Prize: Anamika Shrimali - “Witnessing the Theatre of Self-Harm among South Asian Women: Expression, Performance, and Hot Tea”
- 2021 - Professional Award: Chelsi West Ohueri - “On Living and Moving with Zor: Exploring Racism, Embodiment, and Health in Albania”
- 2021 - Graduate Prize: Luísa Reis-Castro - “A (Future) Ecology of History: Global Health, National Science, and the Release of Wolbachia-infected Mosquitoes in Rio de Janeiro, Brazil”
- 2021 - Undergraduate Prize: Kevin Kim - "Connecting Flight, Early Departures: A Brief History and Future Rhetorics of Modern End-of-Life Care"
- 2020 - Professional Award: Talia Weiner - “Billable services and the ‘therapeutic fee’: On the work of disavowal of political economy and its re-emergence in clinical practice”
- 2020 - Graduate Prize: Emily Vasquez - “Detecting diabetes risk: Philanthropy, technology, and epistemic power in Mexico”
- 2020 - Undergraduate Prize: Chris Magana - " “Beyond Family Separation: The (Anti)Politics of Care and Pathways of Resistance within U.S. Immigration Detention”
- 2019 - Professional Award: Kyrstin Mallon Andrews - “Catching air: Risk and embodied ocean health among Dominican diver fishermen”
- 2019 - Graduate Prize: Kyrstin Mallon Andrews - “Catching air: Risk and embodied ocean health among Dominican diver fishermen”
- 2019 - Undergraduate Prize:
- 2018 - Professional Award: Thurka Sangaramoorthy - “Putting Bandaids on Things That Need Stitches: Immigration and the Landscape of Care in Rural Americans”
- 2018 - Graduate Prize: Raphael Frankfurter - “Conjuring Biosecurity in the Post-Ebola Kissi Triangle: The Magic of Paperwork in a Frontier Clinic”
- 2018 - Undergraduate Prize: Sabine Shaughnessy - “Reproductive Rationalities and Realities of Havana, Cuba during the Post-Fidel Transition”
- 2017 - Professional Award: Sherine Hamdy
- 2017 - Graduate Prize: Laura Meek
- 2017 - Undergraduate Prize:
- 2016 - Professional Award: Katherine Mason
- 2016 - Graduate Prize: Thando Malambo
- 2016 - Undergraduate Prize: Maggie Acosta
- 2015 - Professional Award: Fouzieyha Towghi
- 2015 - Graduate Prize: Sarah Raskin
- 2015 - Undergraduate Prize: Naomi Zucker
- 2014 - Professional Award: Stacy Leigh Pigg
- 2014 - Graduate Prize: Kimberly Sue
- 2014 - Undergraduate Prize: Savannah Harshbarger
- 2013 - Professional Award: Susan Erikson - "Global Health Business"
- 2013 - Graduate Prize: Bo Kyeong Seo; Rachel Irwin
- 2012 - Professional Award: Sarah Willen
- 2012 - Graduate Prize: Nora J Kenworthy
- 2012 - Undergraduate Prize: Victor Koski Karell
- 2011 - Undergraduate Prize: Claire M. Wagner
- 2011 - Professional Award: Sharon Abramowitz - "Trauma and Humanitarian Translation in Liberia: The Tale of Open Mole"
- 2010 - Graduate Prize: Emily Yates-Doerr "The Opacity of Reduction: Nutritional Black-Boxing and the Meanings of Nourishment."
- 2009 - Professional Award: Sherine Hamdy
- 2009 - Graduate Prize: Serena Stein
- 2009 - Undergraduate Prize: Ari Samsky
- 2008 - Professional Award: Joao Biehl
- 2008 - Graduate Prize: Ippolytos Kalofonos - " 'All I Eat is ARVs': Paradoxes of AIDS Treatment Programs in Central Mozambique"
- 2007 - Professional Award: Philippe Bourgois and Jeff Schonberg - “Intimate Apartheid: Ethnic Dimensions of Habitus among Homeless Heroin Injectors”
- 2007 - Graduate Student Award: Krista Schumacher - “Beyond Cultural Competency: An Analysis of Key Variables Affecting Aids Care among Patients at an Urban Indian Health Clinic”
- 2007 - Undergraduate Award: Aki Nakanishi - “Protecting Indigenous Medical Knowledge: Confronting Biopiracy and Neo-cultural Imperialism”
- 2006 - Charles L. Briggs, Professional Prize for “Critical Perspectives on Health and Communicative Hegemony: Progressive Possibilities, Lethal Connections”
- 2006 - Seth M. Holmes, Graduate Student Prize for Oaxacans Like to Work Bent Over: The Naturalization of Social Suffering among Berry Farm Workers”
- 2006 - Alexa Dietrich, Graduate Student Prize for “Corrosion in the System: The Community Health By-Products of Pharmaceutical Production in Northern Puerto Rico”
- 2005 - Paul Farmer and Arachu Castro, Professional Prize
- 2005 - João Biehl, Professional Prize
- 2005 - Michael Westerhaus, Graduate Student Prize
- 2004 - James Pfeiffer, Professional Prize
- 2004 - Sarah Willen, Graduate Student Prize - “Birthing ‘Invisible’ Children: State Power, NGO Activism, and Reproductive Health among Undocumented Migrant Workers in Tel Aviv”
- 2004 - Hanna Garth, Undergraduate Student Prize
- 2003 - Barbara Rylko-Bauer and Paul Farmer, Professional Prize
- 2003 - Cesar Abadia, Graduate Student Prize
- 2003 - Scott Sang-Hyan Lee, Undergraduate Prize
- 2002 - Michael Ennis-McMillan, Professional Prize
- 2002 - Sarah Horton, Student Prize
- 2000 - Carolyn Smith, First Rudolf Virchow Student Prize
- 1995 - Donna Goldstein: AIDS and Women in Brazil: The Emerging Problem, Social Science and Medicine 39(7).
- 1994 - Hans Baer: How Critical Can Clinical Anthropology Be?, Medical Anthropology 15(3):299-317.
- 1993 - Soheir Morsy: Bodies of Choice: Norplant Experimental Trials on Egyptian Women .
- 1992 - Mark & Mimi Nichter: Hype and Weight, Medical Anthropology 13:249-284, 1991
- 1991 - Merrill Singer: Reinventing Medical Anthropology: Toward a Critical Realignment, Social Science and Medicine 30(2):179-187 (1990).
- 1990 - John O'Neil - The Politics of Patient Dissatisfaction in Cross-Cultural Clinical Encounters: A Canadian Inuit example, Medical Anthropology 3 (4): 325–344.
- 1989 - Lynn Morgan, Dependency theory in the political economy of health: An anthropological critique. Medical Anthropology Quarterly 1(2):131-154. 1987.
- 1988 - Ellen Lazarus
- 1987 - Ronnie Frankenberg

== See also ==
- List of anthropology awards
- Virchow Prize for Global Health
