= Charles L. Briggs =

American anthropologist

Charles Leslie Briggs is an anthropologist who works at the University of California, Berkeley, United States. Before working at Berkeley he held a position as Chair of the Ethnic Studies Department and Director of the Center for Iberian and Latin American Studies at University of California, San Diego.

== Biographical information ==
He was born in Albuquerque, New Mexico. He got a BA in Anthropology, Psychology and Philosophy from Colorado College. He received his PhD in Anthropology from the University of Chicago in 1981.

== Research interests ==
Charles L. Briggs is the Alan Dundes Distinguished Professor at Berkeley. His initial research focus centered on the "Mexicano" population of his home state of New Mexico in the US, analyzing how folklore, oral history, and wood carving articulated resistance to racism and land expropriation. Focusing his attention on indigenous people in Venezuela, he then documented--in collaboration with Clara Mantini-Briggs MD MPH--how medical profiling increased the lethality and long-term consequences of outbreaks of cholera and bat-transmitted rabies. In addition to studying revolutionary health care in Venezuela, work in collaboration with Daniel C. Hallin documented biomediatization--how journalism, medical, and public health professionals collaborate in constructing health through news media. His recent work decolonizes understandings of health and medicine, language and communication by rethinking relations between linguistic and medical anthropology. He is currently researching the effect of the U.S. COVID-19 pandemic, analyzing how racialized approaches to health communication intersected with lay participation in knowledge production and care in producing profound social divides.

== Publications ==
Representative publications include:
1980. The Wood Carvers of Córdova, New Mexico: Social Dimensions of an Artistic "Revival." Knoxville: University of Tennessee Press.
1986. Learning How to Ask: A Sociolinguistic Appraisal of the Role of the Interview in Social Science Research. Cambridge: Cambridge University Press.
1988. Competence in Performance: The Creativity of Tradition in Mexicano Verbal Art. Philadelphia: University of Pennsylvania Press.
1990. The Lost Gold Mine of Juan Mondragón: A Legend of New Mexico Performed by Melaquías Romero. Tucson: University of Arizona Press. (By Charles L. Briggs and Julián Josué Vigil).
1990. Poetics and Performance as Critical Perspectives on Language and Social Life. Annual Review of Anthropology 19:59-88 (Richard Bauman and Charles L. Briggs).
1992. Genre, Intertextuality, and Social Power. Journal of Linguistic Anthropology 2(2):131-72. (by Charles L. Briggs and Richard Bauman).
1996. Disorderly discourse: Narrative, conflict, and social inequality. Oxford: Oxford University Press. (Edited by Charles L. Briggs) 2003. Stories in the Time of Cholera: Racial Profiling during a Medical Nightmare. Berkeley: University of California Press. (by Charles L. Briggs with Clara Mantini-Briggs; Spanish, expanded edition, Nueva Sociedad, 2004).
2003. Voices of modernity: Language Ideologies and the Politics of Inequality. Cambridge: Cambridge University Press. (by Richard Bauman and Charles L. Briggs)
2016. Tell Me Why My Children Died: Rabies, Indigenous Knowledge and Communicative Justice. Durham, NC: Duke University Press. (with Clara Mantini-Briggs) 2016. Making Health Public: How News Coverage Is Remaking Media, Medicine, and Contemporary Life. London: Routledge. (with Daniel C. Hallin) 2021. Unlearning: Rethinking Poetics, Pandemics, and the Politics of Knowledge. Logan: Utah State University Press.

== Awards ==
He is the winner of the James Mooney Award, the Chicago Folklore Prize, the Polgar Prize, the Rudolf Virchow Award, the Cultural Horizons Prize, the Society for Medical Anthropology Graduate Student Mentor Award, as well as the Edward Sapir Prize in collaboration with Richard Bauman and, in collaboration with Clara Mantini-Briggs, the J.I. Staley Prize, the Bryce Wood Book Award, the New Millennium, and the Robert B. Textor and Family Prize in Anticipatory Anthropology. He has received fellowships from the National Endowment for the Humanities, the John Simon Guggenheim Memorial Foundation, the Woodrow Wilson International Center for Scholars, the Center for Advanced Studies in the Behavioral Sciences, the School for Advanced Research, and the Georg-August University of Göttingen. He was elected in 2023 as a Fellow of the American Academy of Arts and Sciences.
