= Byron Good =

American medical anthropologist

Byron J. Good
- Born: Byron Joseph Good; 1944
- Education: Goshen College (B.A.); Harvard Divinity School (B.D.); University of Chicago (Ph.D.)
- Occupation: Medical anthropologist
- Employer: Harvard University

Byron Joseph Good (born 1944) is an American medical anthropologist primarily studying mental illness. He is currently on the faculty of Harvard University, where he is Professor of Medical Anthropology at Harvard Medical School and Professor of Cultural Anthropology in the Department of Anthropology.

Good has contributed primarily to the field of psychological anthropology, and his writings have explored the cultural meaning of mental illnesses, patient narratives of illness, the epistemic perspective of biomedicine and its treatment of non-Western medical knowledge, and the comparative development of mental health systems. He has conducted his research in Iran, Indonesia, and the United States.

== Education ==
Good holds a B.A. degree from Goshen College and a B.D. in Comparative Study of Religions from Harvard Divinity School. In 1977, he received his Ph.D. in Social Anthropology from the University of Chicago with a thesis entitled "The Heart of What's the Matter: The Structure of Medical Discourse in a Provincial Iranian Town."

== Career ==
In 2013-2015 Good served as President of the Society for Psychological Anthropology. Good delivered the 2010 Marett Memorial Lecture at Oxford University.

== Research ==
Good's recent research and studies the development of mental health services in various cultures, and primarily Indonesia, where he has been conducting research and teaching at the Faculty of Psychology, Gadjah Mada University in Yogyakarta over the past two decades. He is principal investigator and co-director of the International Pilot Study of the Onset of Schizophrenia, which is a multi-site research project examining the social and cultural aspects of early phases of psychotic illness in various cultural contexts. Good and his wife, Mary-Jo DelVecchio Good, have also been working with the International Organization for Migration on developing mental health services in Aceh, a region where armed conflict and the 2004 Indian Ocean tsunami have had long-term psychological effects on survivors.

Good's contributions to anthropological theory concern the concept of subjectivity in contemporary societies — specifically addressing the convergence of political, cultural, and psychological dimensions in subjective experience—and with a special focus on Indonesian cultural, political and historical context. He has specifically investigated the ways in which culture and social processes shape the onset, the experience, and the course of psychotic illness, and the ways in which this relationship is embedded in and shaped by local, historical, and political contexts.

== Selected publications ==
=== Books ===
- 1994. Good, Byron J. Medicine, Rationality and Experience: An Anthropological Perspective. Cambridge: Cambridge University Press. (Translated and published in French, Italian, Spanish, Japanese, and Chinese.)

=== Edited volumes ===
- 1985. Kleinman, Arthur and Byron Good, editors. Culture and Depression: Studies in the Anthropology and Cross‑Cultural Psychiatry of Affect and Disorder. Comparative Studies of Health Systems and Medical Care Series. Los Angeles: University of California Press.
- 1992. Good, Mary-Jo D., Paul Brodwin, Byron J. Good, and Arthur Kleinman, eds. Pain as Human Experience: An Anthropological Perspective. Berkeley: U. of California Press.
- 1995. Desjarlais, Robert, Leon Eisenberg, Byron J. Good, and Arthur Kleinman. World Mental Health: Problems and Priorities in Low Income Countries. New York: Oxford University Press.
- 2004. Shweder, Richard and Byron J. Good, eds. Clifford Geertz by his Colleagues. Chicago: University of Chicago Press. (Translated into Indonesian.)
- 2005. Giarelli, Guido, Mary-Jo DelVecchio Good, Byron Good, eds. Clinical Hermeneutics. Bologna, Italy (in Italian only).
- 2007. Biehl, Joao, Byron J. Good, and Arthur Kleinman, eds. Subjectivity: Ethnographic Investigations. University of California Press.
- 2008. Good, Mary-Jo DelVecchio, Sandra Hyde, Sarah Pinto, and Byron Good, eds. Postcolonial Disorders. University of California Press.
- 2009. Hinton, Devon and Byron Good, eds. Culture and Panic Disorder. Palo Alto: CA Stanford University Press.
- 2010. Good, Byron J., Michael Fischer, Sarah Willen, Mary-Jo Good. A Reader in Medical Anthropology: Theoretical Trajectories, Emergent Realities. Wiley-Blackwell Publishers.
- 2015. Devon Hinton and Byron Good, eds. Culture and PTSD. Philadelphia: University of Pennsylvania Press.
