= Benjamin P. Bowser =

American sociologist

- Occupations: Sociologist, Research Methodologist and Professor Emeritus of Sociology and Social Services at California State University, East Bay

Academic background
- Education: Franklin and Marshall College
- Alma mater: Cornell University

Academic work
- Discipline: Sociologist
- Institutions: California State University, East Bay

Benjamin Paul Bowser (born 1946) is an American sociologist, research methodologist and professor emeritus of Sociology and Social Services at California State University, East Bay. His scholarship focuses on race relations, the Black middle class, drug abuse prevention, and the social impacts of racism. He is the author or editor of a dozen books including The Black Middle Class: Social Mobility and Vulnerability and Against the Odds: Scholars Who Challenged Racism in the Twentieth Century. He is a board member of Felton Institute and former elected President of Association of Black Sociologists.

== Early life and education ==
Bowser was born in Harlem, New York. He earned his Bachelor of Arts degree in sociology from Franklin and Marshall College in 1969, where he later received the Sidney N. Bridgett ’51 Alumni Award (2020) and was recognized as a Presidential Distinguished Fellow (1997). He completed his Ph.D. in sociology at Cornell University in 1976, supported by a Rockefeller Foundation dissertation fellowship.

== Academic career ==
Bowser began his academic career as assistant professor of Sociology and Afro-American Studies at Binghamton University. He later taught at Cornell University, the University of Colorado Denver, and Santa Clara University, before joining the faculty at California State University, East Bay (then Hayward) in 1987.

He served as an administrator at the Cornell Graduate School while also lecturing in sociology at Cornell University. He later held administrative roles at the Western Interstate Commission in Boulder, Colorado, and lectured in sociology at the University of Colorado, Denver. Bowser also worked as an administrator at Santa Clara University and served in an administrative capacity in information technology at Stanford University.

At California State University East Bay, Bowser served as Department Chair of Sociology and Social Services and Interim Dean of the College of Letters, Arts, and Social Sciences. He retired in 2016 and was named professor emeritus. He held visiting professorship at the University of Paris IV, La Sorbonne.

== Research and scholarly works ==
Bowser's interest in urban communities began during his youth in New York City, where he explored neighborhoods by bicycle and developed a lasting curiosity about urban life.

Bowser's research also advanced the work of Raymond Hunt on the impacts of racism on white Americans, beginning with Impacts of Racism on White Americans (1981; revised 1996; with Duke Austin, 2021). In parallel, he published extensively on the effects of racism on African Americans. His works in this area include Against the Odds: Scholars Who Challenged Racism in the Twentieth Century (2002), The Black Middle Class: Social Mobility and Vulnerability (2007), Racial Inequality in New York City Since 1965 (2019).

Beginning with a visiting professorship at the University of Paris (Sorbonne) in 2005, Bowser extended his research to racism as a global phenomenon. He has collaborated with UNESCO's Slave Routes Project, serving on its advisory board, and co-edited The Transatlantic Slave Trade and Slavery: New Directions in Teaching and Learning (2013) with historian Paul Lovejoy. His work on the psychological consequences of slavery culminated in The Psychological Legacy of Slavery: Essays on Trauma, Healing, and the Living Past (2021, with Aimé Charles-Nicolas), preceded by its French edition L’eslavage: quel impact sur la psychologie des populations? (2018). In recent years, Bowser has continued to address systemic racism and inequality through works such as The Abandoned Mission in Public Higher Education (2017), Racial Inequality in New York City Since 1965 (2019), and Impacts of Racism on White Americans in the Age of Trump (2021).

== Awards ==
- 2023: San Francisco Housing Development Corporation Influential Duo Award
- 2022: Choice Award for Outstanding Academic Publication The Psychological Legacy of Slavery: Essays on Trauma, Healing, and the Living Past.
- 2020:The Sidney N. Bridgett ’51 Award (for Alumnus) Franklin and Marshall College
- 2003:Choice Award for Outstanding Academic Publication Against the Odds: Scholars Who Challenged Racism in The Twentieth Century
- 1997:Franklin and Marshall College Presidential Distinguished Fellow
- 1996:California State University East Bay (Hayward) Outstanding Professor of the Year.
