= Michael Phillips (psychiatrist) =

Canadian psychiatrist

Michael Phillips CM (Chinese name as 费立鹏) is a prominent Canadian psychiatrist known for his work in mental illness and suicide prevention. He resides in Shanghai, China.
