= Zena Stein =

South African epidemiologist (1922–2021)

- Born: July 7, 1922; Durban, South Africa
- Died: November 7, 2021 (aged 99); Coatesville, Pennsylvania, US
- Education: University of Cape Town, University of Witwatersrand
- Occupations: Epidemiologist, activist and doctor
- Employer: Columbia University Mailman School of Public Health
- Title: Professor of Epidemiology and Psychiatry
- Spouse: Mervyn Susser (m. 1949; died 2014)
- Children: Ida Susser

Zena Athene Stein (July 7, 1922 – November 7, 2021) was a South African epidemiologist, activist and doctor. She was professor of epidemiology and psychiatry at Columbia University.

== Biography ==
Stein was born on July 7, 1922, to Lithuanian Jewish immigrants in Durban, South Africa. Her father was a mathematics professor at Natal Technical College, and her mother was a homemaker. She completed a BA and MS in History at the University of Cape Town, and a medical degree from the University of Witwatersrand in Johannesburg.

Stein and her husband Mervyn Susser, whom she married in 1949, began their medical career at a clinic in Alexandra Township. They were active in leftist politics, and left South Africa in 1955 after the clinic's board threatened to fire Dr. Susser if he participated on a panel sponsored by the African National Congress. Stein and Susser moved with their three children to Britain in 1956. They both obtained positions at Manchester University. They moved to New York in 1965.

Her husband died in 2014, and Stein died on November 7, 2021, in Coatesville, Pennsylvania.

== Research and career ==
Stein's research included work on child development, contraception, psychiatric disorders, miscarriage, preterm delivery and birth defects. With Susser, she published a now famous paper on the epidemiology of peptic ulcer.

After moving to New York in 1965, Stein and her husband both began working for Columbia University, and Stein eventually became a full professor of epidemiology. In 1987, she was a cofounder of the H.I.V. Center for Clinical and Behavioral Studies at the New York State Psychiatric Institute and Columbia University.

Towards the end of their careers, Stein and Susser focused increasingly on HIV advocacy and research, both in the United States and in their native South Africa. With other health activists, they organised a meeting in Maputo in April 1990, which aimed to alert the African National Congress to the threat. The impact of this meeting was limited. With others, they were, however, successful in securing funding for a programme of HIV/AIDS research in Southern Africa and Stein and Susser served as co-directors of the Africa Centre for Health and Population Studies in 1999.

== Awards and honors ==
2017 - Platinum Medal, the SAMRC Lifetime Achievement award (for scientists who have raised the profile of South African science).

2013 - Doctor of Science Honorary Degree from Columbia University

2012 - Joseph Zubin Award

1993 - Doctor of Science in Medicine Honorary Degree from University of Witwatersrand.

== Selected publications ==
=== Books ===
- Mervyn Susser, Zena Stein. 2009. Eras in epidemiology: the evolution of ideas. Oxford; New York: Oxford University Press.
- Zena Stein. 1975. Famine and human development : the Dutch hunger winter of 1944-1945. New York: Oxford University Press.
- Jennie Kline, Zena Stein, Mervyn Susser. 1989. Conception to birth : epidemiology of prenatal development. New York: Oxford University Press.
- Zena Stein, Maureen Hatch. 1986. Reproductive problems in the workplace. Philadelphia: Hanley & Belfus.

=== Academic papers ===
- Gollub EL, Stein Z, van de Wijgert JHHM, Jones H, Ralph L, Padian N. 2020. ECHO: context and limitations. Lancet. 395(10222):e24. doi:10.1016/S0140-6736(19)33108-3.
- Gollub EL, Jones HE, Ralph LJ, van de Wijgert JHHM, Padian N, Stein Z. 2019. The Need for Policy Change Regarding Progestin-Only Injectable Contraceptives. J Women's Health. (9):1180-1184. doi:10.1089/jwh.2018.7284.
- Harrison A, Hoffman S, Mantell JE, Smit JA, Leu CS, Exner TM, Stein ZA. 2016. Gender-Focused HIV and Pregnancy Prevention for School-Going Adolescents: The Mpondombili Pilot Intervention in KwaZulu-Natal, South Africa. J HIV AIDS Soc Serv. (1):29-47. doi:10.1080/15381501.2014.999183.
- Hoffman S, Mantell J, Exner T, Stein Z. 2004. The future of the female condom. Perspect Sex Reprod Health. 36(3):120-6. doi:10.1363/3612004.
- Gollub EL, Stein ZA. 2016. Beyond LARC: Advancing Reproductive Health to Include Men. Am J Public Health. 106(7):1169-70. doi:10.2105/ajph.2016.303245.
