= American Ethnological Society =

Anthropology professional association

The American Ethnological Society (AES) is the oldest professional anthropological association in the United States.

== History of the American Ethnological Society ==
Albert Gallatin and John Russell Bartlett founded the American Ethnological Society in New York City in 1842. Their goal was to promote research in ethnology and all inquiries involving humans. The early meetings of the AES took place in the homes of the members, where they discussed all aspects of human life, from history and geography to philology and anthropology. The AES was a scholarly institution, in which papers were presented that were later published.

In the late 19th century, the AES's focus changed from the evolutionary concerns of ethnology to the academic discipline of anthropology. The AES remained small, due to financial difficulties until the 1920s. In 1916, the AES became the American Ethnological Society, Inc. During this time, it also became associated with Columbia University and linked to the American Anthropological Association. In the 1930s, the AES and AAA jointly published the American Anthropologist, which concerned itself with all four fields of anthropology.

In 1950, the AES went nationwide and started having biannual meetings across North America. In 1972, the new American Ethnologist journal was created to focus on the expanding field of socio-cultural anthropology. In the early 1980s the American Ethnological Society became incorporated into the American Anthropological Association as a sub-section.

Since 2003, the American Ethnological Society has awarded three awards biennially. These are the Sharon Stephens Prize (for junior scholars) and the Senior Book Prize (for senior scholars), which are each awarded for a book "that speaks to contemporary social issues with relevance beyond the discipline and beyond the academy," and the Elsie Clews Parsons Prize, which is awarded to a graduate student for a stand-alone paper based on an ethnography.

=== American Ethnologist ===
American Ethnologist is an international, quarterly journal concerned with social and cultural anthropology in the broadest sense of the term. The journal’s description states that its articles "combine ethnographic specificity with original theoretical thinking, conveying the relevance of the ethnographic imagination to the contemporary world." The Editor-in-Chief is Susanna Trnka (University of Auckland), the Associate Editors are Jesse Hession Grayman (University of Auckland) and L.L. Wynn (Macquarie University), and the Managing Editor is Pablo Morales. According to the Journal Citation Reports, the journal has a 2025 impact factor of 3.3. American Ethnologist is published in partnership with Wiley-Blackwell.

=== Presidents of AES ===
Current and Past Presidents of AES
Name	Years
Carol McGranahan	2026-2027
Kenneth Guest	2023-2025
Carolyn Rouse	2023-2023
Jacqueline Solway	2019-2021
Marc Edelman	2017-2019
Hugh Gusterson	2015-2017
Carol Greenhouse	
Sally Merry	
Jane Collins	
David Nugent	
Ida Susser	
Catherine Lutz	
Fred Myers	
Susan Harding	
Emily Martin	
Margery Wolf	
Renato Rosalado	
Ellen Basso	
Stephen Gudeman	
Louise Lamphere	
Sally Falk Moore	
Eugene Hammel	
Keith Basso	
June Helm	
Edward Bruner	
David Mayberry-Lewis	1981
Richard F. Salisbury	1980
Harold C. Conklin	1979
Morton H. Fried	1978
William C Sturtevant	1977
Edward Norbeck	1976
