= Society for Medical Anthropology =

Academic organization

The Organization of Medical Anthropology was formed in 1967 and first met on April 27, 1968, at the 27th Annual Meeting of the Society for Applied Anthropology (SfAA), during which the Medical Anthropology Newsletter was conceived and first published in October 1968 with 53 subscribers. On November 22, 1968, the Organization held its first medical anthropology workshop at the American Anthropological Association (AAA) Annual Meeting and became the Group for Medical Anthropology (GMA). Thereafter, medical anthropology meetings have met regularly both at the SfAA and AAA meetings. At the AAA annual meeting in San Diego, California, in November 1970, the GMA became the Society for Medical Anthropology (SMA) and adopted its Constitution, of which its first objective was “to promote study of anthropological aspects of health, illness, health care, and related topics.” In 1971, the SMA became a section of the AAA.

The SMA offers several awards including the Rudolf Virchow Award.
