= List of visual anthropology films =

This is a chronologic list of representative anthropologically-minded films and filmmakers:

- Alfred C. Haddon – UK
  - Torres Strait Expedition, 1898
- Edward S. Curtis – US
  - In the Land of the Head Hunters, 1916
- Zora Neale Hurston - US
  - Fieldwork Footage, 1928
  - Commandment Keeper Church, Beaufort South Carolina, May 1940
- Percy Powell-Cotton - UK
  - Crafts in the Cameroons, 1931
  - Gorilla Drive, Cameroons, 1931
  - Osonigbe Juju House and Benin Brass Cutting, 1931
- Robert J. Flaherty – US
  - Nanook of the North, 1922
  - Moana, 1926
  - Tabu, 1931
  - Man of Aran, 1934
  - Louisiana Story, 1948
- José Leitão de Barros – Portugal
  - Maria do Mar, 1930
  - Ala-Arriba!, 1942
- Jean Epstein – Poland
  - L'or des mers (The ocean's gold), 1932
- Diana and Antoinette Powell-Cotton - UK
  - Angola: Dombondola Potter, 1936
  - Angola: Scenes from a household (Dombondola), 1936
- Margaret Mead - US
  - Trance and Dance in Bali (Trance and Dance in Bali), 1937
- Jean Rouch – France
  - Les Maîtres Fous (The Mad Masters), 1954
  - Moi, un noir, 1958
  - Chronique d’un été (Chronicle of a Summer), 1961
  - Jaguar, 1954–1967
  - Petit à petit, 1972
- Lionel Rogosin – US
  - On the Bowery, 1957
  - Come Back, Africa, 1957
- John Marshall – US
  - The Hunters, 1957
  - N!ai: The Story of a !Kung Woman, 1980
  - A Kalahari Family, 1951–2000
- António Campos – Portugal
  - A Almadraba atuneira (Tuna net), 1961
  - Vilarinho das Furnas, 1971
  - Histórias selvagens (Savage stories), 1978
  - Falamos de Rio de Onor (Let’s talk about Rio de Onor)
  - Gente da Praia da Vieira (The people of Praia da Vieira), 1976
  - Terra fria (Cold land), 1992
- Manoel de Oliveira – Portugal
  - Acto da Primavera (Act of Spring), 1963
- Michel Brault – Canada
  - Pour la suite du monde, 1963
  - Orders (Les Ordres) 1975
  - The Paper Wedding (Les Noces de papier), 1990
- Pierre Perrault – Canada
  - Pour la suite du monde, 1963
- Robert Gardner – US
  - Dead Birds, 1964
  - The Nuer, 1970
  - Rivers of Sand, 1975
  - Sons of Shiva, 1985
  - Forest of Bliss, 1986
- David MacDougall and Judith MacDougall – Australia
  - To Live with Herds, 1968/1972
  - Nawi, 1968/1970
  - The Wedding Camels, 1974/1977
  - Lorang's Way, 1974/1979
  - A Wife Among Wives, 1974/1981
  - Three Horsemen, 1978/1982
  - Stockman's Strategy, 1982/1984
  - Collum Calling Canberra, 1982/1984
  - Doon School Chronicles, 1997-1998/2000
  - Diyas, 1997/2000
- Tim Asch – US
  - The Feast, 1969
  - Yanomamo: A Multidisciplinary Study, 1971
  - Magical Death, 1974
  - The Ax Fight, 1975
  - A Man Called "Bee": Studying the Yanomamo, 1975
  - A Balinese Trance Seance, 1979
  - Jero on Jero: A Balinese Trance Seance Observed, 1980
  - Jero Tapakan: Stories From the Life of a Balinese Healer, 1983
  - The Medium is the Masseuse: A Balinese Massage, 1983
  - The Water of Words: A Cultural Ecology of an Eastern Indonesian Island, 1983
  - Spear and Sword: a Ceremonial Payment of Bridewealth, 1989
  - Releasing the Spirits, 1990
  - A Celebration of Origins, 1992
- António Reis and Margarida Cordeiro – Portugal
  - Trás-os-Montes, 1976
  - Ana, 1984
- Noémia Delgado – Portugal
  - Máscaras (Masks), 1976
- Bob Connolly and Robin Anderson
  - First Contact, 1983
  - Joe Leahy’s Neighbors, 1988
  - Black Harvest, 1991
- Dennis O'Rourke – Australia
  - Yumi Yet – Independence for Papua New Guinea, 1976
  - Ileksen – Politics in Papua New Guinea, 1978
  - Yap ... How Did you Know We’d Like TV, 1980
  - The Shark Callers of Kontu, 1982
  - Couldn't Be Fairer, 1984
  - Half Life: A Parable for the Nuclear Age, 1985
  - Cannibal Tours, 1988
  - The Good Woman of Bangkok, 1991
  - Cunnamulla, 2000
  - Land Mines -- A Love Story, 2004
- John Melville Bishop - US
  - Rhesus Play, 1977
  - YoYo Man, 1978
  - The Land Where The Blues Began, 1979
  - New England Fiddles & New England Dances, 1983
  - The Last Window, 1987
  - Himalayan Herders, 1997
  - Hosay Trinidad (1999)
  - Oh What A Blow That Phantom Gave Me, 2003, (with Harald Prins)
  - Oss Tales, 2007
  - John Bishop Short Films, (14 films 1975-2007)
- Pedro Costa – Portugal
  - Casa de Lava (Down to Earth), 1994
  - Ossos (Bones), 1997
  - No Quarto da Vanda (In Vanda’s room), 2000
  - Juventude em Marcha (Colossal youth), 2006
- Flora Gomes – Guiné-Bissau
  - Po di Sangui, 1996
  - Nha Fala, 2002
- Ziba Mir-Hosseini and Kim Longinotto - Iran/UK
  - Divorce Iranian Style, 1998
  - Runaway, 2001
- Ruth Behar - Cuba/US
  - Adio Kerida (Goodbye Dear Love) 2002
- Randy Olson
  - Flock of Dodos, 2006
- Harjant Gill - US / India
  - Milind Soman Made Me Gay, 2007
  - Roots of Love, 2011
  - Mardistan/Macholand, 2014
  - Sent Away Boys, 2016
- Véréna Paravel and Lucien Castaing-Taylor- France/UK
  - Leviathan, 2012
  - somniloquies, 2017
  - Caniba, 2017
- Maria Giménez Cavallo - USA / Italy
  - Anime galleggianti, 2024
- Robert Lemelson – US
  - 40 Years of Silence: An Indonesian Tragedy, 2009
  - Afflictions: Culture and Mental Health in Indonesia Film Series, 2010 / 2011
    - Shadows and Illuminations, 2010
    - Family Victim, 2010
    - The Bird Dancer, 2010
    - Kites and Monsters, 2011
    - Memory of My Face, 2011
    - Ritual Burdens, 2011
  - Jathilan: Trance and Possession in Java, 2011
  - Ngaben: Emotion and Restraint in a Balinese Heart, 2012
  - Standing on the Edge of a Thorn, 2012
