= Ethnocinema =

Genre of film

Ethnocinema, from Jean Rouch’s cine-ethnography and ethno-fictions, is an emerging practice of intercultural filmmaking being defined and extended by Melbourne, Australia-based writer and arts educator, Anne Harris, and others. Originally derived from the discipline of anthropology, ethnocinema is one form of ethnographic filmmaking that prioritises mutuality, collaboration and social change. The practice's ethos claims that the role of anthropologists, and other cultural, media and educational researchers, must adapt to changing communities, transnational identities and new notions of representation for the 21st century.

Ethno-cinematographers have also been associated with American historian James Clifford who has asserted that “all ethnographic representations are partial truths”. Collaborative ethnographic film and video projects are created with the intention of going beyond "preserving", "empowering" or "giving voice" to marginalised cultures, ethnicities, communities or individuals. According to theorists, such voices already have agency and share community or agendas with ethnocinematic filmmakers. Ethnocinematic films primarily document "relationships" between filmmakers from different cultures, or subcultures, who now share common space of a political, philosophical, geographical or virtual nature.

Ethno-cinematographers include Jean Rouch, Trinh T. Minh-ha, Harald Prins, David and Judith MacDougall, Faye Ginsburg, Timothy Asch and, indigenous filmmakers such as Australian Essie Coffey who collaborating interculturally to create ethnocinematic works.

== History ==
Tobing Rony identifies three modalities in early ethnographic representation including “ethnographic inscription” (Regnault), “taxidermic mode” (Flaherty's Nanook), and “self-reflexive” (Rouch's films of the 1950s). Of these, Rouch's films are closest to being the forerunners of contemporary ethnocinema. Many film theorists and ethnohistorians have helped to define an evolving ethnographic film in the late 20th century, among them American Bill Nichols.

Ethnocinema is typical of a shift toward destabilizing traditional notions of representation, both in the West/North and in cultures and communities which had historically been the subjects of such films, and in which indigenous and diasporic peoples are taking control of their own representations, or working (as in ethnocinema) in intercultural collaboration. In addition to Rouch, this includes the work of such ethnographers and intercultural filmmakers as Trinh T. Minh-ha, Harald Prins, David and Judith MacDougall, Faye Ginsburg, Timothy Asch and others. More recently, indigenous filmmakers such as Essie Coffey (Australia) are collaborating interculturally to create ethnocinematic works. Working against the observational cinema tradition, these filmmakers are all acknowledging and deconstructing Minh-ha's observation that “Everywhere we go, we become someone’s private zoo”, and theorists like Harris continue to draw on her work.

Other examples of early attempts to define ethnocinema include the 1972 "ethnocinematic experiment" of Sol Worth and John Adair documented in "American Indians and the ethnocinematic complex: From native participation to production control", in which seven co-participants of Navajo heritage were given video cameras and asked to make films which were ‘Indian’; these films, however, were framed by essentialising notions of Other and did not seek to go beyond the researcher/researched dichotomy. Tobing Rony (1996) and Sam Pack (2000) consider developments in Indigenous media in relation to the anthropological notion of “native authenticity” and why such essentialising notions are increasingly irrelevant in the 21st century's ethnocinematic context. Yet the ability to truly collaborate in ethnographic research remains a contentious notion in anthropological and other circles, as ethnographic documentary scholar Jay Ruby asserts; what he calls Ethnographic Cinema must, he claims “be the work of academically educated and academically employed socio-cultural anthropologists”. By Ruby's reckoning, what is emerging as ethnocinema has almost nothing to do with ethnographic films. By this definition, even Jean Rouch doesn't qualify.

Conversely, Rouch encouraged the potential of ethnographic film as a “celebration of a relationship” between filmmaker and imaged, in which the “rapport and participation” between both parties enhances any end-product that is collectively achieved. Loizos's claim (like Ruby's) that contemporary filmmakers blur the lines between "authentic" ethnography and general documentary seems increasingly out of place. Traditional ethnographic filmmaking as a tool of anthropological researchers seeking to bring the stories of “distant peoples to audiences in North America and Europe” is increasingly outmoded in a culture of YouTube and social networking sites screaming for video content.

=== Toward a contemporary ethnocinema: some contradictions ===
The confusion continues. By 2006, there are still scant references to ethnocinema and they frequently conflict. One online blog characterises a Burmese festival as “a surrealist anti-documentary, with no voice-over, odd visual juxtapositions, and none of the quasi-academic tone that afflicts so much official ethno cinema”. An abstract for an academic paper on the ritual branding of Andean cattle in Peru refers to the paper as an “ethnocinematographical study in which we reinterpret, with and in the film” the acts which they have recorded filmically, using the video cameras as “observation instruments”, none of which characterizes contemporary ethnocinematic work.

Several recent European film festivals list among their offerings the category of ethnocinema, without giving examples or defining the term. Still other contemporary film festivals appear to use the terms ethnographic and ethnocinematic interchangeably, which only adds to the confusion. In 2001, Notes From the Underground, Goran Gocić’s insider look at the filmmaker Emir Kusturica, appeared in which he discusses what he alternatively calls ethno-cinema and then just "ethno". A Modern Language Association Review article opined, "The appeal of Kusturica's films … is that of "ethno" cinema, a cinema rooted in local traditions but expressed in "Western" form. This liberal political engagement with exotic subject matter is nonetheless, argues Gocić, an empowerment of the marginal."

and from a far less favourable online book review: he invests considerably more time to embracing instead his own recurring but vague references to 'ethno-cinema' as a base context from which Kusturica is operating (and by which Gocic seems to mean to have it both ways: indulging in exoticism and critiquing others' supposed essentializing). The only specific examples he offers to define this category are a handful of big budget Hollywood films involving Native Americans.

Gocić himself says that, “inside film history itself, ethno cinema is the most exciting cinematic concept that the world has had to offer in the past two decades: aesthetically, it is difficult to argue against”. However, throughout the text his attempts to define ethnocinema contradict and obscure any practical working definition. Gocić identifies "ethno" as having been around since the 1950s and as being typified by a sense of the “local”, including local motifs, but frequently made for a Western audience. Surprisingly, only nine pages later he locates the birth of "ethno cinema" “in the late 1970s and early 1980s solely judging by the Cannes winners, which were Italian at the end of the 1970s”.

Gocić does attempt to characterise and define his version of ethno cinema with the following: “nostalgia,” (as a search for the “‘lost ‘authenticity’ of primitivism”), “intertextuality, openness and subjectivity (as postmodern characteristics), incredulity (or denial of ideology), and ‘double coding' or unexpected, surrealist, incongruous elements”.

Ethnocinema, then, suggests that the voices/images of "women/natives/others" have something in common, and have agency in contributing to ethnographic film, whether independently or collaboratively, interculturally or intra-culturally. Current attempts to offer a working definition of ethnocinema may share more with the more recent movement of intercultural cinema which emerged around 1990. Laura Marks identifies this emergence as connected to three main factors: “the rise of multiculturalism … availability of funding … and an intellectual climate characterised by the disintegration of master narratives and a growing conceptualisation of knowledge as partial and contested”. Whatever its filmic and academic antecedents, ethnocinema is emerging, and – as Rouch has repeatedly shown us – "the other cannot be denied" as his/her image and means of production transforms.

In ethnocinema there is the belief that in the relationship which emerges through the shared project, both self and Other are understood and represented in newly constructed ways. One way of disrupting traditional ethnographic documentary voyeurism is in making transparent the intercultural relationship normally shrouded behind the scenes. Foster's contention that controlling the means of production is "foregrounding subjectivity", is limited. It presumes a one-way relationship between the content and construction of all ethnographic films (including ethnocinematic ones), and assumes that by creating the films the subject is empowered and the gaze is recast. It ignores the complex relationship between reception and production, and classifies films created by marginalised filmmakers as more authentic, or even automatically transgressive in a dominant culture. This cannot be assumed, either in content or reception. We have moved well beyond orientalism and the temporary inability of the Other to represent her or himself, so that "they must therefore be represented by others", but similarly it cannot be assumed that self-representation is automatically "authentic" or an end in itself. In ethnocinema, relationship and process always take precedence over formal considerations. Obviously, to achieve a wide viewing audience, formal concerns cannot be completely ignored, but these aesthetic concerns are addressed together in the co-creation of the films. In ethnocinema, there is no perception of a conflict between its ethnographic and popular culture characteristics. It remains ethnographic because it is grounded in cultural specificity, which is not essentialist and can be always-changing. It does not seek to "document" a culture, as in ethnocinema culture is understood to be varied, diverse and always emerging.

=== Ethnocinema: new directions ===
In Picturing Culture: Explorations of Film and Anthropology, Ruby calls for places where “critical standards are debated and canons develop”, and the need for ethnographic filmmakers to generate a set of critical standards analogous to those for written ethnographies. Harris agrees, and says that standards are needed, but diverges from Ruby's definition in two important ways: firstly as a call to ethnocinematic filmmakers (whether academic or non-academic) that films included in this category must prioritise a post-colonial collaborative relationship between makers and imaged; and secondly, that Ruby's so-called “marketplace considerations” need not pollute the product which is made. Ruby proposed in 2008 that “anthropologists should simply relinquish the term ethnographic to professional documentary filmmakers and seek another term to characterize their efforts”; while Harris proposes that ethnographic is being superseded by ethnocinematic filmmaking.
