= The Doon School Quintet =

Documentary film series

- Poster of the first film in the series, Doon School Chronicles
- Directed by: David MacDougall
- Produced by: Centre for Cross-Cultural Research, Australian National University; CCR Media Works
- Starring: Students and faculty of The Doon School
- Edited by: David MacDougall
- Distributed by: Berkeley Media (North America); Ronin Films (Australia); Royal Anthropological Institute (Europe)
- Running time: Total (5 films): 494 minutes
- Countries: India; Australia
- Language: English

The Doon School Quintet is a five-part ethnographic film series made by the American visual anthropologist and documentary filmmaker David MacDougall, between 1997 and 2000, at The Doon School, an elite all-boys boarding school in India. For thirteen months over three years, MacDougall lived with the students and was given unprecedented access for filming inside the residential campus. By the end, MacDougall had more than 85 hours of material, which he edited into 5 parts, with a total duration of about 8 hours. The project ranks among MacDougall's most ambitious and longest works and is the only film series in his oeuvre (the 1977-81 Turkana Conversations trilogy was co-directed with his work partner and wife, Judith MacDougall).

The films were released between 2000 and 2004, and are titled Doon School Chronicles (2000), With Morning Hearts (2001), Karam in Jaipur (2001), The New Boys (2003), and The Age of Reason (2004). In addition to studying the boys' daily lives at Doon, considered the most prestigious boys' boarding school in India, the films examine the ideology and "social aesthetics" of the school, its mix of privilege and egalitarianism, and its role in Indian postcoloniality and the emergence of a new Indian elite.

The films have been praised and noted for their significant contribution to the genres of anthropological documentary and ethnographic film. In 2005, anthropologist and professor at Temple University, Jay Ruby, described the project in the review paper The Last 20 years of Visual Anthropology: "MacDougall’s recent work on the Doon School in India and my digital ethnographic work on Oak Park (Ruby 2005) are attempts to continue an exploration that began with Rouch (Jean Rouch). The Doon School project in India by David MacDougall is perhaps the most noteworthy digital ethnographic film project."

== Background ==
MacDougall first learnt about The Doon School in Dehradun in 1991, while making Photo Wallahs in the nearby hill town of Mussoorie, but did not visit it till 1996. It was sociologist Sanjay Srivastava, who was researching the school for his book Constructing Post-Colonial India: National Character and the Doon School, who convinced MacDougall about the school's suitability as a subject for his next anthropological film project. Both BBC and Australian Broadcasting Corporation agreed to co-finance the film, but later nothing came of it. MacDougall saw this as a "liberation" and gave up the idea of making a conventional "film", relying instead on a video camera for the long-term study. "I was not tied to a script or a deadline or a commissioning editor looking over my shoulder. I could do this work within a modest university research budget, at a tiny fraction of the cost of my previous film".

== Development and process ==
The then headmaster of Doon, John Mason, was supportive of the project, and MacDougall started filming at the school in 1997. He was allowed to live on campus, take meals with the students, and film wherever and whenever he wanted. "There was never an attempt to direct or censor my work ... Perhaps because I was never a teacher at the school and only rarely exercised a teacher's authority, I was accepted more readily as a harmless observer, and very occasionally as an honorary schoolboy", MacDougall has stated. He spent thirteen months over three years there, and recorded more than 85 hours of footage. MacDougall considered the project to be open-ended and has stated: "I wanted to find out what it was possible to learn about the school by filming it."

MacDougall kept a journal while editing the films, in which he expressed his preference to repeat certain shots and treat them as "leitmotifs". "Once the convention is established I can see using shots somewhat as Ozu (Yasujiro Ozu) uses similar shots of rooms, to signal that we are back in a familiar setting ... If I allow the film to settle too securely into a realist narrative without interrupting it, the use of repetition will come as an intrusion - pretentious and irrelevant", he wrote. He shared his thoughts on the best way to start the first film, Doon School Chronicles. The opening shot in the final cut is not of the boys, school grounds and buildings, or anything that would provide context and ease the viewer into an unfamiliar setting. It opens with a shot showing rows of white school uniforms drying on the grass; MacDougall explained in his journal: "The best way to begin a film is abstractly and impressionistically, with a series of close-up images showing clothing, gestures, colours and activity. This will signal to the audience that the film means to deal with these sensory and aesthetic aspects of school life."

== Structure and themes ==
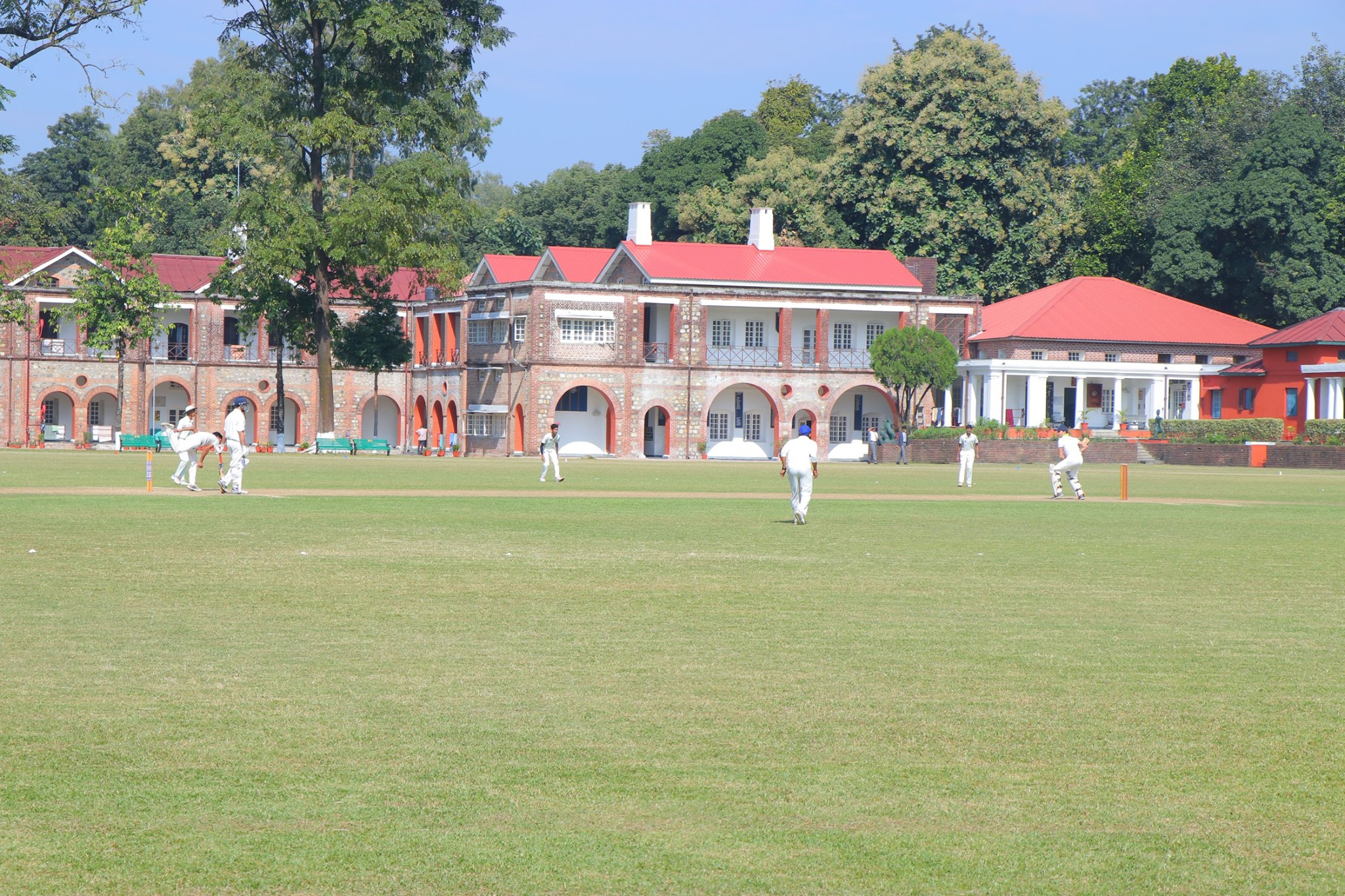
Main Field; the first film, Doon School Chronicles, provides an overview of the school: the campus, social environment, prevalent hierarchies, daily rituals. The all-boys boarding school is located in the foothills of the Himalayas.

The films were not organized in a linear way and did not adhere to any scheme of conscious narrative development. While filming, MacDougall did not subscribe to any overarching plan, thinking it could have imposed a "false structure on what I found, or at the very least blind me to the alternatives." The first film is the longest, and MacDougall called it the "web" in which the other films are suspended.

=== Doon School Chronicles (2000) ===
Duration: 140 minutes

The film is divided into ten chapters and offers an overview of various aspects of life inside the school. It covers the school's physical and social environments, hierarchies on campus, daily rituals and traditions, behaviours and mannerisms of boys of different ages, the school's visual aesthetics through material objects like uniform, furniture, utensils, classrooms and buildings. Anthropologist Anna Grimshaw has noted that "it offers both an unusually rich ethnography ... and a model for a new kind of anthropological inquiry." MacDougall focuses on the boys as well as the material culture of the school. "MacDougall brings what is often overlooked as merely the setting of cultural practice to the forefront of attention. Thus the landscape—understood as terrain, architecture, objects, shapes, textures, colors, movement, choreography, and so on—comes to be reconfigured as an active agent in, rather than a passive backdrop to, the forging of subjectivity," wrote Grimshaw.

=== With Morning Hearts (2001) ===
Duration: 110 minutes

The focus of this film is the younger boys, aged twelve, at school. MacDougall had not intended to focus on the new students at school, but while filming and sheltering from rain one day, he found himself in Foot House, a "holding house" where boys spend their first year. It caused a shift in tone for the film, as MacDougall envisaged that the viewers, and he himself, could become co-participants with the new boys, as they discovered the school for themselves. The film follows the experience of one boy and his close friends, who overcome their initial homesickness and ultimately, at the end of the year, join the "main house", where senior boys live, and begin their communal journey proper. Grimshaw describes the camerawork of the film as never hurried or distracted, and always "with" the boys. Aparna Sharma, Indian documentary filmmaker and theorist, has discussed the effect created by his camerawork: "MacDougall's sustained observation of the students' bodies complements the verbal discourses in the film ... the subjects consistently reference the camera and the whole gamut of their gestures and movements reveal how their bodies and its vocabularies are intimately tied to and shaped by the spaces they occupy."

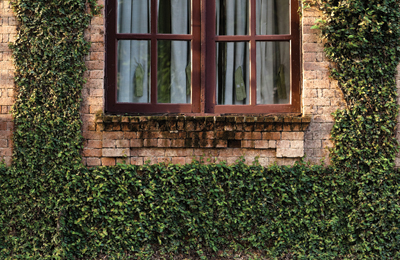
Detail of the ivy-covered Main Building.The films focus on the "social aesthetics" of the school, and the camera often lingers on elements like architectural details, uniforms, cutlery or furniture.

=== Karam in Jaipur (2001) ===
Duration: 54 minutes

The third film follows the protagonist of With Morning Hearts, as he moves to Jaipur House, one of the five main houses at Doon. He is shown studying, participating in field hockey, gymnastics, singing, and struggling to settle into the house and accept the authority of senior boys. The film captures his response and reactions, as he negotiates new situations, his changing surroundings, and tries to make a mark. While the film is largely observational, at some points MacDougall engages in informal conversations with the boys. Grimshaw writes "His techniques are intended to explore the domain of lived experience, what he calls 'social aesthetics'—the way that landscape (understood as sensory, emotional and material) shapes and is shaped by human subjectivity."

=== The New Boys (2003) ===
Duration: 100 minutes

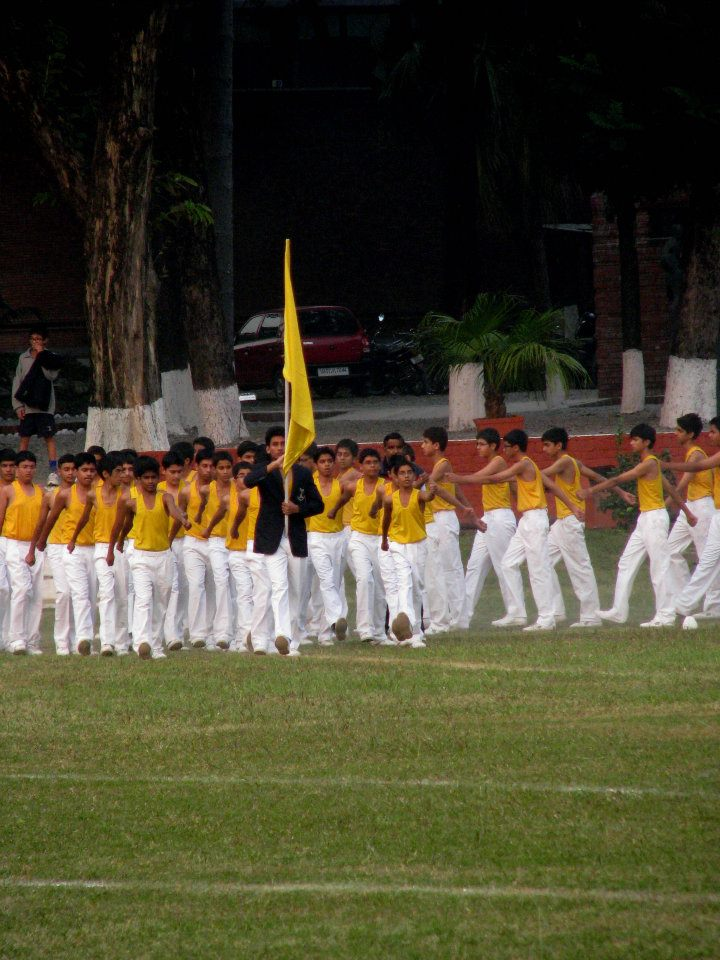
Marching exhibition in progress; while filming, MacDougall tried to identify a set of themes that held the "conceptual keys to the school's aesthetic structures", like clothing, eating, informal games and organized sports.

The film deals with the dynamics among a group of new boys in a dormitory in Foot House. It shows the arrival of the boys, their struggle with suitcases and trunks, and then follows them for two months as they ease into the rhythms of school life. There are moments of class-consciousness when the boys talk to each other, and sometimes an open display of aggression or homesickness. One section focuses on the boys' digressive conversations about ghosts, vegetarianism, cannibalism and kung fu. MacDougall later wrote, "What I found curious was that although I said little, the conversation revolved quite naturally around me and the camera, as if my presence acted as a focus or stimulus for it. However, the forms of interaction fluctuated: sometimes the boys addressed me and sometimes talked among themselves."

=== The Age of Reason (2004) ===
Duration: 87 minutes

The final film is intimate in nature and is considered by MacDougall to be the most personal and autobiographical of them all. It is narrated by him and focuses on the life of one boy, his conversations with MacDougall, and how their relationship develops. It has been noted for its distinct style that is different from the other four films, as the subject asserts his own agency through mannerisms and "outpourings of talk" that appear to tilt the balance of the filmmaking process. "The film is a testament to the skill of MacDougall—his ability to become a participant in the process and its complex choreography, while at the same time resisting the impetus toward closure or summary," Grimshaw wrote in her book Observational Cinema. "He leaves it open as to where the relationship might lead—until he recognizes the point at which it must be relinquished." Through extended conversations, the film offers a glimpse of the critical faculties of the boy at the "age of reason".

== Critical reception ==
The film project has been studied and cited in many journals and books of visual anthropology and ethnographic film. In 2005, reviewing two decades of visual anthropology, anthropologist and professor Jay Ruby wrote, "The Doon School project in India by David MacDougall is perhaps the most noteworthy digital ethnographic film project." Film editor and novelist Dai Vaughan wrote in the Visual Anthropology journal: "Without doubt the Doon Project will provide plentiful material for discussion of such matters as the place of such a school in a democratic society; the acculturation of children; how an elite perpetuate its values. Nevertheless, simply to call these anthropological films would, while true, be a little like calling Things Fall Apart [by Chinua Achebe] an anthropological novel. They are a major contribution to our screen culture, and deserve to be seen well beyond the confines of the discipline."

Lucien Castaing-Taylor, Professor of Visual Arts and Anthropology at Harvard Department of Anthropology, said about the film: "An extraordinarily insightful and intimate exploration of the social and cultural landscape of India's most elite boys' boarding school. In following the boys' daily routines and dramas, the film also affords us a rare glimpse at processes of postcolonial Indian identity formation. This is a wonderful teaching tool that will enhance any course dealing with issues of adolescence, education, institutional structure and 'habitus', or postcolonial elites. My students were stupefied by the eloquence, independence, and maturity of the Doon School boys." Anna Grimshaw, Professor at the Emory College of Arts and Sciences, Emory University, reviewed the project in her book Observational Cinema: Anthropology, Film, and the Exploration of Social Life: "In working observationally, aligning his own practice as a filmmaker with the everyday process of children's learning (rather than commenting on a place outside of them), MacDougall attempts to generate the conditions in which his own understanding might be transformed by the agency of his subjects. Through filming he found himself documenting the innovative qualities of children—their capacity to think laterally about their and others' lives. His camera revealed them to be adept at working things out in practice."

== Honours ==
The film series was an Honoree at the Margaret Mead Film Festival, Association for Asian Studies, Film Festival of the Royal Anthropological Institute of Great Britain and Ireland, and Göttingen International Ethnographic Film Festival. It has been selected and screened by the Society for Visual Anthropology and American Anthropological Association.

== Bibliography ==
- Grimshaw, Anna; Ravetz, Amanda (2009). Observational Cinema: Anthropology, Film, and the Exploration of Social Life. Indiana University Press. ISBN 978-0253221582.
- Houtman, Coral (2011). "The Student Author, Lacanian Discourse Theory and 'La nuit américaine'". In Myer, Clive (ed.). Critical Cinema: Beyond the Theory of Practice. Columbia University Press. ISBN 9781906660369.
- MacDougall, David (2006). The Corporeal Image: Film, Ethnography, and the Senses. Princeton University Press. ISBN 9780691121567. JSTOR j.ctt4cgb17.
- MacDougall, David (2013). "From a filmmaker's journal". In LaTosky, Shauna; Strecker, Ivo (eds.). Writing in the Field: Festschrift for Stephen Tyler. LIT Verlag. ISBN 9783643904249.
- Sharma, Aparna (2015). Documentary Films in India: Critical Aesthetics at Work. Palgrave Macmillan. ISBN 9781137395443.
