= The Wedding Camels =

1980 film by David MacDougall and Judith MacDougall

The Wedding Camels is an ethnographic film directed by David MacDougall and Judith MacDougall, filmed in 1974 and released in 1980 (108 min., Turkana with English subtitles), that examines the negotiations and cultural practices that surround the tradition of the Turkana people of Kenya of giving a bridewealth before a wedding. The film was funded and distributed by the University of California Extension Center for Media.

== Overview ==
The film is observational in style and the Turkana subjects speak for themselves through subtitles, rather than being spoken about through narration. The MacDougalls' films fit into the forefront of the movement away from narration and towards observational and participatory cinema in the 1970s and 1980s. The husband and wife team have made several ethnographic films. The Wedding Camels is the second of three they made about the Turkana, the others being Lorang's Way and A Wife Among Wives. The trilogy is referred to as Turkana Conversations, which speaks to the fact that the MacDougalls seem to specialize in forming a comfortable relationship with their subjects that allows them to enter into their private world and record not just interviews, but private conversations among families and community members.

== Awards ==
The Wedding Camels won the Royal Anthropological Institute's first Film Award in 1980, for best ethnographic film of the past five years. It has also been awarded honors at film festivals including the Berlin Film Festival, the Edinburgh Film Festival, and the Margaret Mead Film Festival.
