= Deep Hearts =

- Directed by: Robert Gardner
- Produced by: Robert Gardner
- Narrated by: Robert Gardner
- Cinematography: Robert Gardner
- Edited by: Robert Gardner; Robert Fulton
- Production companies: Harvard University Film Study Center; Documentary Educational Resources
- Distributed by: Phoenix/BFA Films & Video
- Release date: 1979
- Country: United States
- Languages: English; Fulah

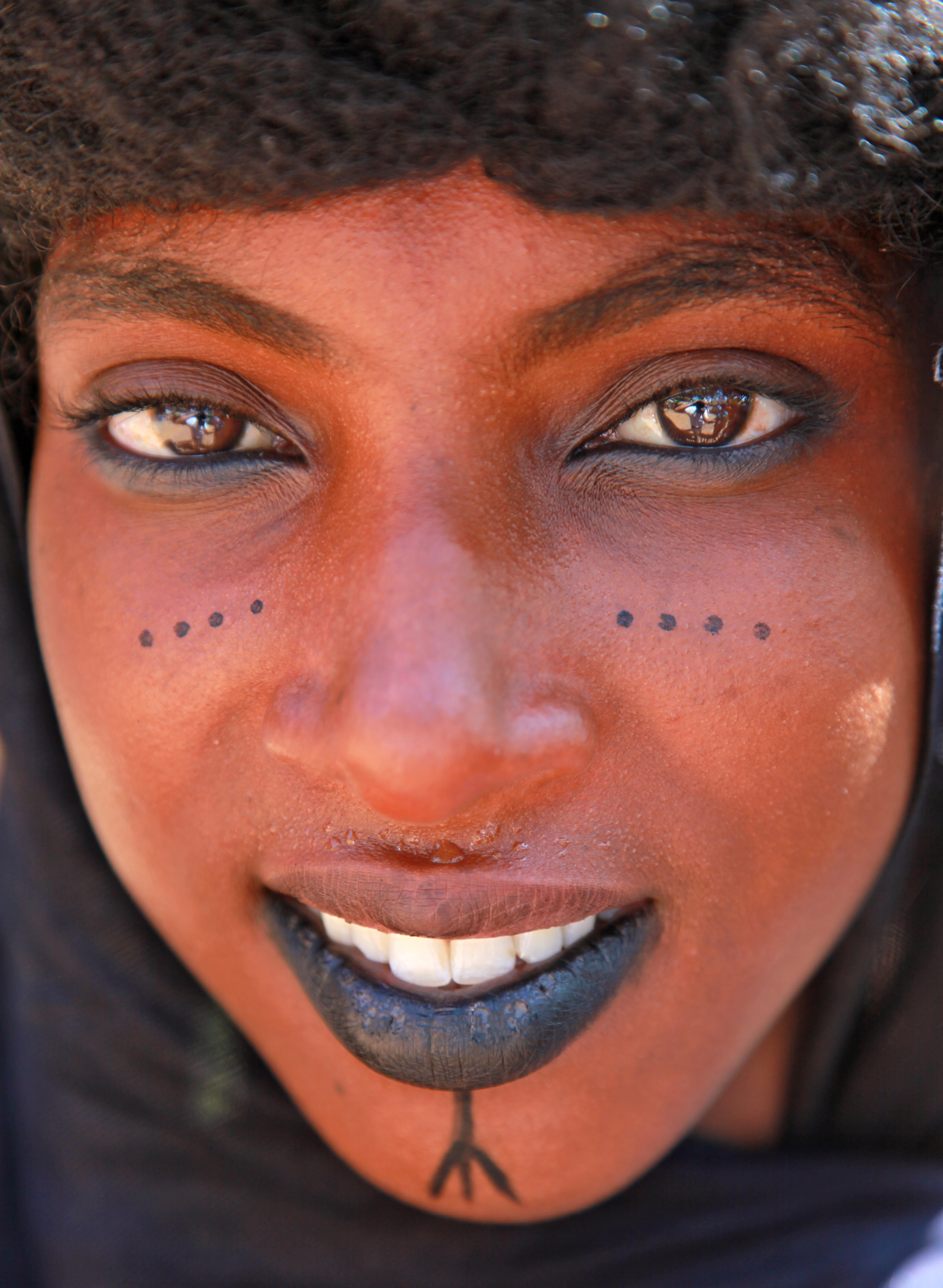
Young fulani woman

Deep Hearts, a film released in 1980, is a documentary by Robert Gardner that is based on the Bororo Fulani, a small village located in Niger.

== Synopsis ==
The documentary is based on the Bororo Fulani, a small village tribe of nomad people in Niger. They celebrate the end of rainy season every year in a ceremonial style. The tradition they celebrate is known as, "Gerewol." During Gerewol, all the men and women of the tribe gather together to dance and sing as they celebrate the end of the rainy season. Men adorn themselves with beautiful jewelry and facepaint in order to attract the females in the village towards the men. Beauty is very important from an early age and they are taught to love themselves for what they look like and value their thinness. They make it their lifetime mission to be beautiful and feel beautiful for themselves and to others. As such, beauty breeds jealousy and it sparks envy and paranoia over looks and how others perceive each other.

The first establishing shot of the film is of the group of people in the tribe singing around a fire during sunset. Later in the film, it shows the tribe in a line singing, while smiling and embracing the camera being in their face. They can be seen sitting with each other while putting cosmetics on, and getting prepared for the celebration. They perform different dances and sang different songs and enjoyed themselves.

== Cast ==
- Director - Robert Gardner
- Narrator - Robert Gardner
- Cinematographer - Robert Gardner
- Film editors - Robert Garnder, Robert Fulton
- Dancers - The Bororo Fulani residents

== Production ==
The Film what shot in the Niger Republic. Produced by the Film Study Center Harvard University. Produced by Robert Gardner. Published by Documentary Educational Resources Watertown Massachusetts 2005.

== Release information ==
The film was released in 1980.

== Reception ==
When the film was released, there was little to no reception from movie critics. According to IMDb, the film was given a 6.4 out of 10, which is a lower rating compared to Time Indefinite, another documentary he made over 10 years later.

Based on a review made by Michael Lieber, the film was a success, but there are its pros and cons. For one, he praises Gardner for being creative and having superb filmmaking. In addition, it goes on to mention how Gardner was able to transition through each scene without using a visual cliche in it. When he does this, it helps evoke a sense of amazement of the Bororo style of dancing and it’s graceful movement. As for cons, Lieber states that the narration doesn’t mesh well with what the viewer sees on screen. When Gardner shows the tribe getting prepared and helping each other putting on cosmetics, the narration doesn’t help with what it’s presenting that it either overstates the case of what we are seeing, or the visual representation we see fails to match with the narration.

== About the film ==
There are different Fulani tribes that can be located in Nigeria; the northern zones, the central zone, and the southern zones. These three zones span across a parallel between the East and the West throughout Nigeria. The north zone is known for their wet season rivers, the Komadugu Yobe and the Komadugu Gana, with the shores of Lake Chad. For the middle zone, it lies along the 12 Parallel of latitude. It is known for being the area of wet season rainpools with little water during the wet season. Finally, the southern zone is known for being an area of heavier rainfall, and being a marshy area, which is unsafe for cattle in the wet season, but providing in the dry season reasonable pasture and a comparatively easy water supply. There are four main tribes in the nomad tribe along Nigeria; Wo'dabe, Daneji-Hontor’be group, Mare, and the Ful’be Waila.

1. Wo’dabe- The Woda'be are in many respects the most interesting of the Fulani groups of the Emirate. The name ' Wo'da'be' is given by some of the Bornu Fulani as the verb “woda “, which Gaden in his dictionary translates as “to taboo; to have a taboo.”
2. Daneji- Hontor’be group- The Hontorbe and the Daneji have been classified as a separate group, because they are so insistent on their being non-Woda'be, and because they maintain that they were originally one tribe with a common ancestor, whose name, however, they do not know.
3. Ful’be Waila- The so-called Shuwa Fulani derive their origin from a section of Shuwa Arabs, who emigrated from eastern Bornu to Damagaram in consequence, it is said, of a tribal feud, and intermingled with the FulWe Waila.
4. Mare- In the Kaga District, some forty miles west of Maiduguri, are certain small sections of semi-nomad Fulani, who by long residence among the Shuwa Arabs as herdsmen, have for- gotten their Fulani tribal origin and call themselves by the names of the Shuwa tribes among whom they lived.
