= Jane Tuckerman =

American artist (born 1947)

- Born: Jane Bayard Tuckerman; 1947 (age 78–79)
- Education: Garrison Forest School; The Art Institute of Boston; Rhode Island School of Design (MFA)
- Known for: Photography; mixed media
- Relatives: Bayard Tuckerman Jr. (father)
- Website: janetuckerman.com

Jane Bayard Tuckerman (born 1947) is an American artist. Her photographs, made primarily in black-and-white film, document rituals and displaced communities across multiple countries, including a 1985 project on death rituals in Benares, India. She also makes large-scale Iris prints, mixed-media works combining torn-paper collage with photographs of interiors and landscapes, and black "paper dolls" as homes for spirits after they leave their bodies.

In 1982, she received a National Endowment for the Arts fellowship in photography. Her work is in the permanent collections of such institutions as the Metropolitan Museum of Art, the Museum of Fine Arts, Houston, and the Minneapolis Institute of Art.

== Early life and education ==
Tuckerman is from South Westport, Massachusetts. She graduated from Garrison Forest School and The Art Institute of Boston, and earned an MFA from the Rhode Island School of Design, where she studied photography under Harry Callahan and Aaron Siskind.

== Career ==
In 1975, Tuckerman exhibited infrared photographs and works combining embroidery and found objects mounted on photographs at the Addison Gallery of American Art. Tuckerman joined Harvard's Department of Visual and Environmental Studies in 1978 as the only full-time photography faculty member. In 1981, Tuckerman and photographer Sharon Fox curated an exhibition of infrared photography at Harvard University's Carpenter Center for the Visual Arts. The exhibition produced a book titled Second Sight, with an introduction by poet James Dickey.

Boatman on the Ganges, c. 1985, from Tuckerman's Benares, India series

In early 1985, she traveled to Benares, India, with photographer Christopher James to photograph the city's death rituals while filmmaker Robert Gardner was making Forest of Bliss. The project was sponsored by the Smithsonian Institution, the National Endowment for the Humanities, and the Harvard Film Archive. Her photographs were published in Aperture, exhibited at the Carpenter Center, and later traveled to New York City's American Museum of Natural History. By 1986, she was an associate professor of studio arts and left Harvard at the end of that academic year.

The Benares project led to further travels to document rituals around the world. She photographed dancing, mourning, and other practices in Mexico, Brazil, Poland, Cambodia, Argentina, and Thailand. Her series The Displaced documented people uprooted by conflict in Rwanda and Bosnia.

In 2009, the New Bedford Art Museum in New Bedford, Massachusetts, hosted a retrospective of her work, which included photography, sculpture, painting, collage, and collected objects.

== Recognition ==
- 1982: National Endowment for the Arts fellowship in photography
- 1987: Visiting artist, American Academy in Rome

== Collections ==
Tuckerman's work is in the following public collections:

- Harvard Art Museums, Cambridge, Massachusetts
- Hood Museum of Art, Dartmouth College, Hanover, New Hampshire
- Metropolitan Museum of Art, New York
- Minneapolis Institute of Art
- Museum of Fine Arts, Houston
- RISD Museum, Providence, Rhode Island

== Publications ==
- Ghosts. Boston: Pond Press. 2005. ISBN 978-0-9666776-9-0.
- Haunted. New Bedford, Massachusetts: New Bedford Art Museum. 2008. OCLC 302411928.
- In Place of Another. Prague: Impossible Dream Editions. 2016. ISBN 978-0-9961141-1-0.
- The Strait and Narrow. Pearly Gates Press. 2019. ISBN 978-0-578-46995-9.

== Personal life ==
Tuckerman is the daughter of jockey, businessman, and politician Bayard Tuckerman Jr.

In 1971, she married psychologist Henry Elliott Foley Jr. Some of her work appears in museum records under the name Jane Tuckerman Foley.
