= Margaret Mead Film Festival =

Annual event in New York City

The Margaret Mead Film Festival is an annual film festival held at the American Museum of Natural History in New York City. It is the longest-running, premiere showcase for international documentaries in the United States, encompassing a broad spectrum of work, from indigenous community media to experimental nonfiction. The Festival is distinguished by its selection of titles, which tackle diverse and challenging subjects, representing a range of issues and perspectives, and by the forums for discussion with filmmakers and speakers.

The Mead Festival was the first venue to screen the now-classic documentary Paris Is Burning (1990) about the urban transgender community. Furthermore the Mead Festival has introduced New York audiences to such acclaimed films as the Oscar-winning documentary The Blood of Yingzhou District (2006), Oscar-winning animated short The Moon and the Son: An Imagined Conversation (2005), The Future of Food (2004), Power Trip (2003), and Spellbound (2002).

== Background ==
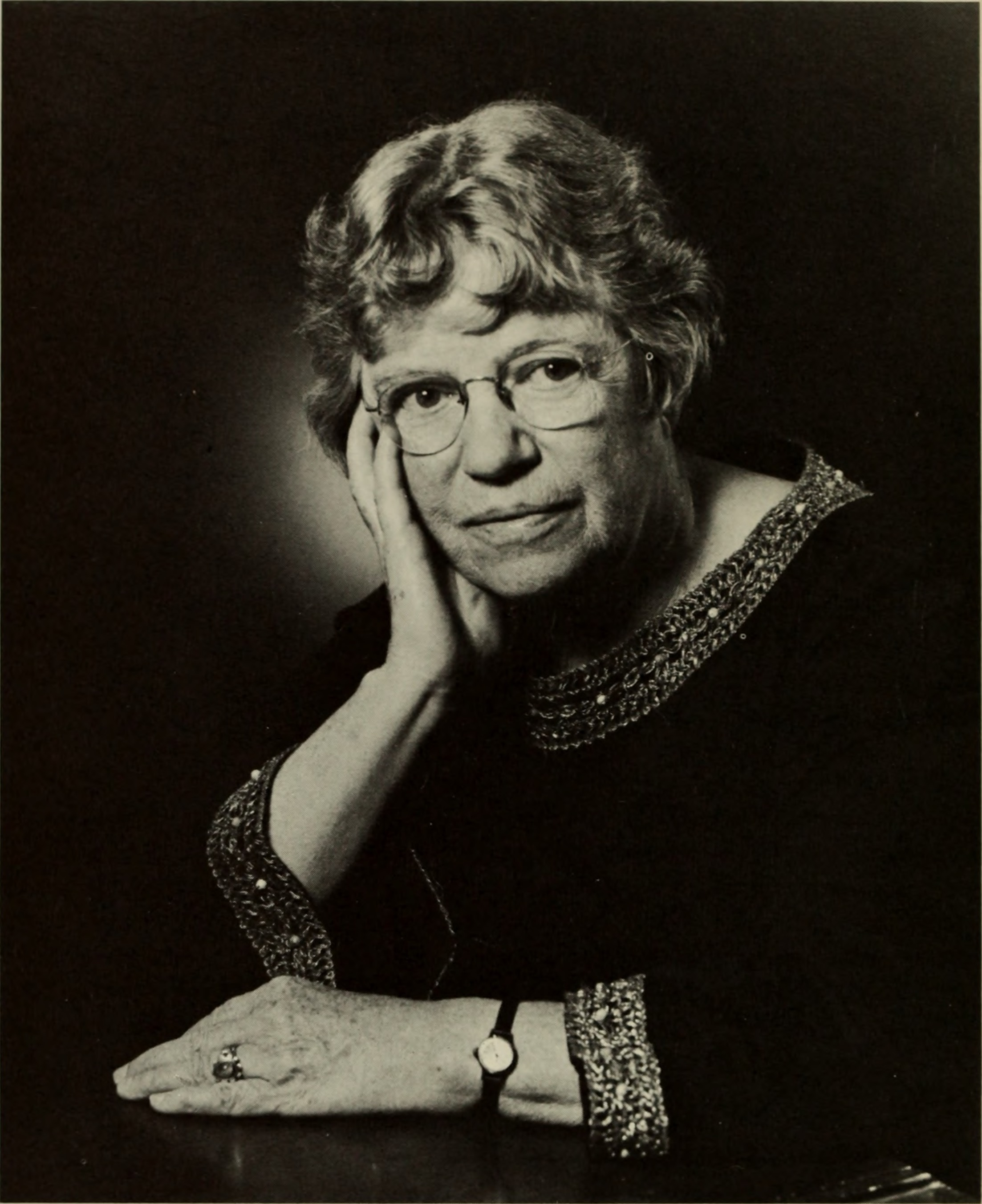
Margaret Mead in 1969

The festival owes its origins (and its name) to renowned anthropologist Margaret Mead, who worked for 52 years at the American Museum of Natural History. She acted as curator in the museum's Department of Anthropology, where she helped create the Hall of Pacific Peoples, which bears her name. In her lifetime, Margaret Mead greatly advanced the academic standing and popular appeal of cultural anthropology, and was also one of the earliest anthropologists to integrate visual methods into her research, focus on the study of visual communication, and teach courses on culture and communication. "Pictures are held together," Dr. Mead wrote, "by a way of looking that has grown out of anthropology, a science in which all peoples, however contrasted in physique and culture, are seen as members of the same species, engaged in solving problems common to humanity."

In 1976, in commemoration of her 75th birthday, the museum decided to pay tribute to her work with a film festival of top ethnographic and other documentary films. In its early years, the festival focused on ethnographic films and was hosted by the USC Center for Visual Anthropology (directed by Mead's student, the late filmmaker Tim Asch). Today, the Festival continues to exemplify Mead's teachings: that film is a tool for cross-cultural understanding and that it is possible, and important, for societies to learn from each other.

== Margaret Mead Filmmaker Award ==
Margaret Mead Filmmaker Award recognizes documentary filmmakers who embody the spirit, energy, and innovation demonstrated by anthropologist Margaret Mead in her research, fieldwork, films, and writings. Each year the award is given to a filmmaker whose feature documentary offers a new perspective on a culture or community remote from the majority of our audiences' experience as well as displays artistic excellence and originality in storytelling technique. U.S., North American, or World Premiere documentaries (60 minutes or longer) are eligible for the Award. This award has a cash prize.

- 2010 Winner: Marc Francis/Nick Francis for When China Met Africa
- 2011 Winner: Yuanchen Liu for To the Light
- 2012 Winner: Adam Isenberg for A Life Without Words

== Traveling Festival ==
The Margaret Mead Traveling Film & Video Festival presents highlights of the Festival that takes place in November. Each year titles are selected from the annual Mead Festival to participate in this year-long program which brings innovative non-fiction work to communities throughout the United States and abroad.

== 2011 Mead Festival ==
=== 2011 Films ===
- At Night, They Dance (La nuit, elles dansent) by Isabelle Lavigne and Stéphane Thibault
- The Bengali Detective by Phil Cox
- Blue Meridian by Sofie Benoot
- Broad Channel by Sarah J. Christman
- Cinema and the Future of Space by Michael Shara
- Convento by Jarred Alterman
- The Creators by Laura Gamse
- Deus Ex Boltanski by Robert Gardner
- Empty Quarter by Alain LeTourneau and Pam Minty
- The End of the World (Kres Šwiata) by Mateusz Skalski
- Extraction by Myron Lameman
- Flames of God by Meshakai Wolf
- Grande Hotel by Lotte Stoops
- Guañape Sur by János Richter
- Hula and Natan by Robby Elmaliah
- Moroloja by Alexander Ingham Brooke
- The Observers by Jacqueline Goss
- Planet Kirsan (Planeta Kirsan) by Magdalena Pita
- Skydancer by Katja Esson
- Space Tourists by Christian Frei
- Voice Unknown by Jinhee Park
- White Elephant (Nzoku ya Pembe) by Kristof Bilsen

=== 2011 Mead Filmmaker Award Nominees ===
- All for the Good of the World and Nošovice (Vše Pro Dobro Svêta a Nošovic)by Vit Klusák
- Kinder (Kids) by Bettina Büttner
- Memoirs of a Plague by Robert Nugent
- Rainmakers by Floris-Jan van Luyn
- Small Kingdom of Lo by Caroline Leitner, Daniel Mazza, and Giuseppe Tedesch
- Space Sailors (Fliegerkosmonauten) by Marian Kiss
- To the Light by Yuanchen Liu

=== 2011 Retrospective Series ===
- Jaguar by Jean Rouch
- Jero on Jero: A Balinese Trance Séance Observed by Patsy Asch, Timothy Asch, and Linda Connor
- Kanehsatake: 270 Years of Resistance by Alanis Obomsawin
- Les maîtres fous (The Mad Masters) by Jean Rouch
- N!ai, The Story of a !Kung Woman by John Marshall and Adrienne Miesmer
- Trance and Dance in Bali by Gregory Bateson and Margaret Mead
- A Wife Among Wives by David MacDougall and Judith MacDougall
- We Still Live Here (Âs Natayuneân) by Anne Makepeace

=== 2011 Jury ===
The Mead Award jury is led by the Academy Award-nominated director of Black Swan and The Wrestler, Darren Aronofsky, Karen Cooper, director of New York City's Film Forum; Liz Garbus, Academy Award-nominated director of Bobby Fischer Against the World, The Farm and 2002 MacArthur Fellow Stanley Nelson, director of the Emmy-winning documentary The Murder of Emmett Till.

== 2012 Mead Festival ==
- 18 Days in Egypt by Jigar Mehta and Yasmin Elayat
- Bad Weather by Giovanni Giommi - Mead Filmmaker Award Nominee
- Bay of All Saints
- Bury the Hatchet by Aaron Walker
- Buzkashi!
- Children of Srikandi
- A Fierce Green Fire: The Battle for a Living Planet
- George Stoney Tribute: How the Myth Was Made
- Grab
- Himself He Cooks by Valérie Berteau and Philippe Witjes - Mead Filmmaker Award Nominee
- The Human Tower by Ram Devineni and Cano Rojas - Mead Filmmaker Award Nominee
- Jai Bhim Comrade
- Keep Me Upright (Tiens moi droite) by Zoé Chantre - Mead Filmmaker Award Nominee
- A Life Without Words (Una Vida Sin Palabras) by Adam Isenberg - Mead Filmmaker Award Nominee
- The Light in Her Eyes
- Manapanmirr, in Christmas Spirit by Miyarrka Media - Mead Filmmaker Award Nominee
- Maori Boy Genius by Pietra Brettkelly - Mead Filmmaker Award Nominee
- Mead Arcade
- Meanwhile in Mamelodi by Benjamin Kahlmeyer
- Nagaland: The Last of the Headhunters by Patrick Morell - Mead Filmmaker Award Nominee
- Re-Seeing the Century: The Expedition on Film
- Sun Kissed
- Sweet Dreams
- The Other Half of Tomorrow by Sadia Shepard and Samina Quraeshi - Mead Filmmaker Award Nominee
- Through Navajo Eyes
- Tropicália
- Tundra Book. A Tale of Vukvukla, the Little Rock (Kniga Tundry. Povest' o Vukvukaye - malen'kom kamne)
- Tunniit: Retracing the Lines of Inuit Tattoos (Atuaqsiniq Inuit Tunninginnik)
- Wheat and Tares (Het Kaf en Het Koren) by Stefan Wittekamp and Suzanne Arts - Mead Filmmaker Award Nominee
- Whose Story Is It? Story Lounge

== See also ==
- Film festivals in North and Central America
