= Sons of Shiva =

- Directed by: Robert Gardner; Askos Ostor
- Production company: Film Study Center at Harvard University
- Distributed by: Documentary Educational Resources
- Release date: 1985
- Running time: 29 min.
- Country: United States
- Language: English

Sons of Shiva is a 1985 American documentary film by ethnographic filmmaker Robert Gardner and Askos Ostor, about the worship of the God Shiva, features practices of Hindu worship and devotion, a four-day Gajan ceremony, a Sacred Thread ceremony in Bishnupur and Baul singers of Bengal. It was the first film of "Pleasing God" trilogy of films about Hindu worship produced by Harvard's Film Study Center. It was followed by Forest of Bliss (1986) set in Benaras (Varanasi).

== Film festivals & awards ==
- Cine Golden Eagle Award, 1985
- Second Prize, International Festival of Ethnographic Films, Nuoro, Italy, 1986
- Margaret Mead Film Festival, 1986
- Festival dei Popoli, 1986
- Metropolitan Museum of Art, 1986
- Festival of India, Washington, DC, 1986
