= Dances of the Kwakiutl =

- Directed by: William Heick
- Produced by: Robert Gardner
- Cinematography: William Heick
- Production company: Orbit Films
- Distributed by: Documentary Educational Resources
- Release date: 1951
- Running time: 9 min.
- Country: America
- Language: English

Dances of the Kwakiutl is a 1951 American short documentary film directed by William Heick and produced by Robert Gardner. It was distributed by Documentary Educational Resources.

== Scenario ==
The film comproses sequences filmed in 1950 in Fort Rupert, British Columbia, featuring a performance by Kwakiutl people of their secretive Hamatsa ceremony.

== See also ==
- In the Land of the Head Hunters, a 1914 silent film
