= Jan Broekhuijse =

Dutch anthropologist and ethnographer (1929–2020)

Johan Theodorus (Jan) Broekhuijse
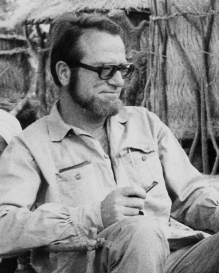
- Jan Broekhuijse while visiting the village chief of Damesma, Centre-Nord, Burkina Faso, 1974
- Born: Johan Theodorus (Jan) Broekhuijse; 22 December 1929; Haarzuilens
- Died: 27 September 2020 (aged 90); Nieuwkoop
- Occupation: Anthropologist

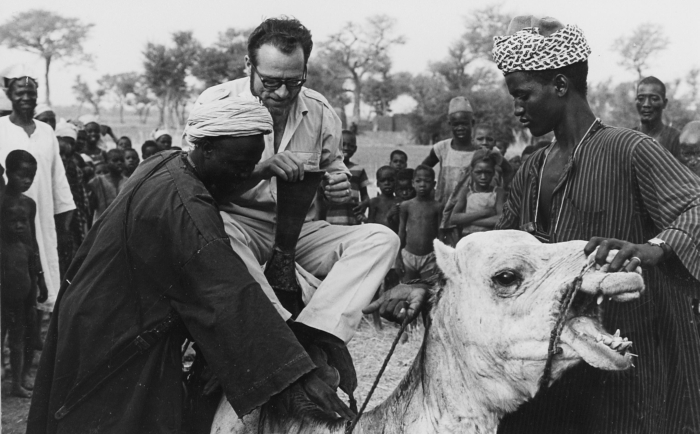
The owner of a dromedary is helping Jan Broekhuijse to mount it in public, Burkina Faso 1970.

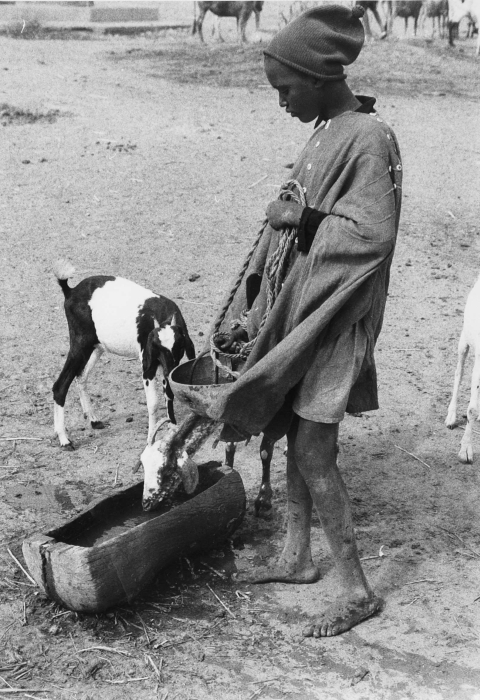
Jan Broekhuijse: A Fulani boy is pouring water for his goats in a wooden trough, Burkina Faso 1974.

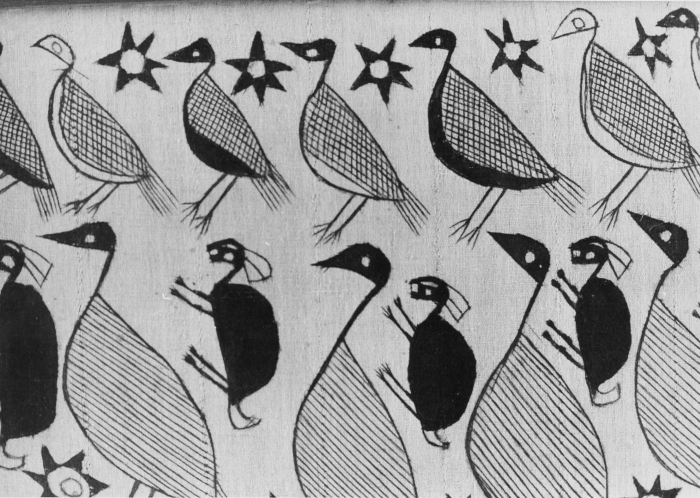
Jan Broekhuijse: A hand-painted canvas of the Senufo people, Burkina Faso? 1960–1970.

Johan Theodorus (Jan) Broekhuijse (22 December 1929 in Haarzuilens, the Netherlands – 27 September 2020 in Nieuwkoop, the Netherlands) was a Dutch anthropologist, ethnographer, civil servant and photographer.

== Career ==
Broekhuijse, the son of a farmer from Haarzuilens in the center of the Netherlands, studied Non-Western Sociology at Utrecht University where he graduated cum laude in 1958. In January 1959 he left for Dutch New Guinea to become a civil servant of the Dutch government there. Broekhuijse was researching the living conditions of the urbanized Papuans in Hollandia, when he was transferred that same year to post Wamena in the eastern highlands, where the Dutch government still lacked a firm foothold. As a staff member of the Kantoor Bevolkingszaken (Population Affairs Office), a government office promoting anthropological, linguistic and demographic research among the Papuans, he researched the culture of the Dani people in the Baliem Valley, a warlike mountain tribe that had not yet been brought under Dutch control. In those years, Broekhuijse was also an advisor and participant of the American Harvard-Peabody Expedition (1961–1965) to the Dani, led by the cinematographer and anthropologist Robert Gardner. The expedition resulted in Gardner's prize winning documentary film Dead birds (1963), on the warfare of the Dani people. However, expedition member and sound engineer Michael C. Rockefeller, son of the politician Nelson Rockefeller, disappeared without a trace in November 1961.

After returning to the Netherlands in 1964, Broekhuijse served for several years as a civil servant at the Dutch Ministry of Foreign Affairs while he prepared his Dutch PhD thesis for his doctorate in 1967 with professor Henri Théodore Fischer (1901–1976) at Utrecht University. The same year he joined the Anthropology Department of the Royal Tropical Institute (Koninklijk Instituut voor de Tropen, KIT) in Amsterdam as a scientific officer, with Jan van Baal (1909–1992), Dutch anthropologist and former governor of New Guinea, at the helm since 1959. Until his retirement in 1994 Broekhuijse was affiliated with KIT, where he mainly conducted research in Africa for development projects. In the early 1970s he joined an acquisition tour in Burkina Faso for the Tropenmuseum (Museum of the Tropics), resulting in hundreds of ethnographic photographs.

Broekhuijse later donated his extensive collection of ethnographic objects from the Dani and the Lani people of Western New Guinea to the Tropenmuseum in Amsterdam; his photographic collection was donated to the African Studies Centre Leiden. Broekhuijse died in 2020 at the age of 90.

== Gallery: Samo culture of Burkina Faso, 1970–1971 ==
Photographs by Jan Broekhuijse:

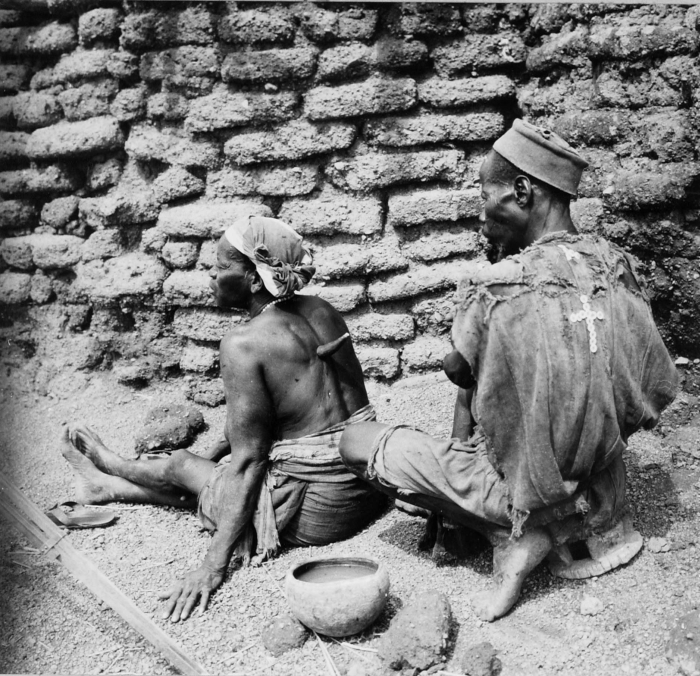
A local healer is treating a woman with cupping therapy in front of a loamstone wall.

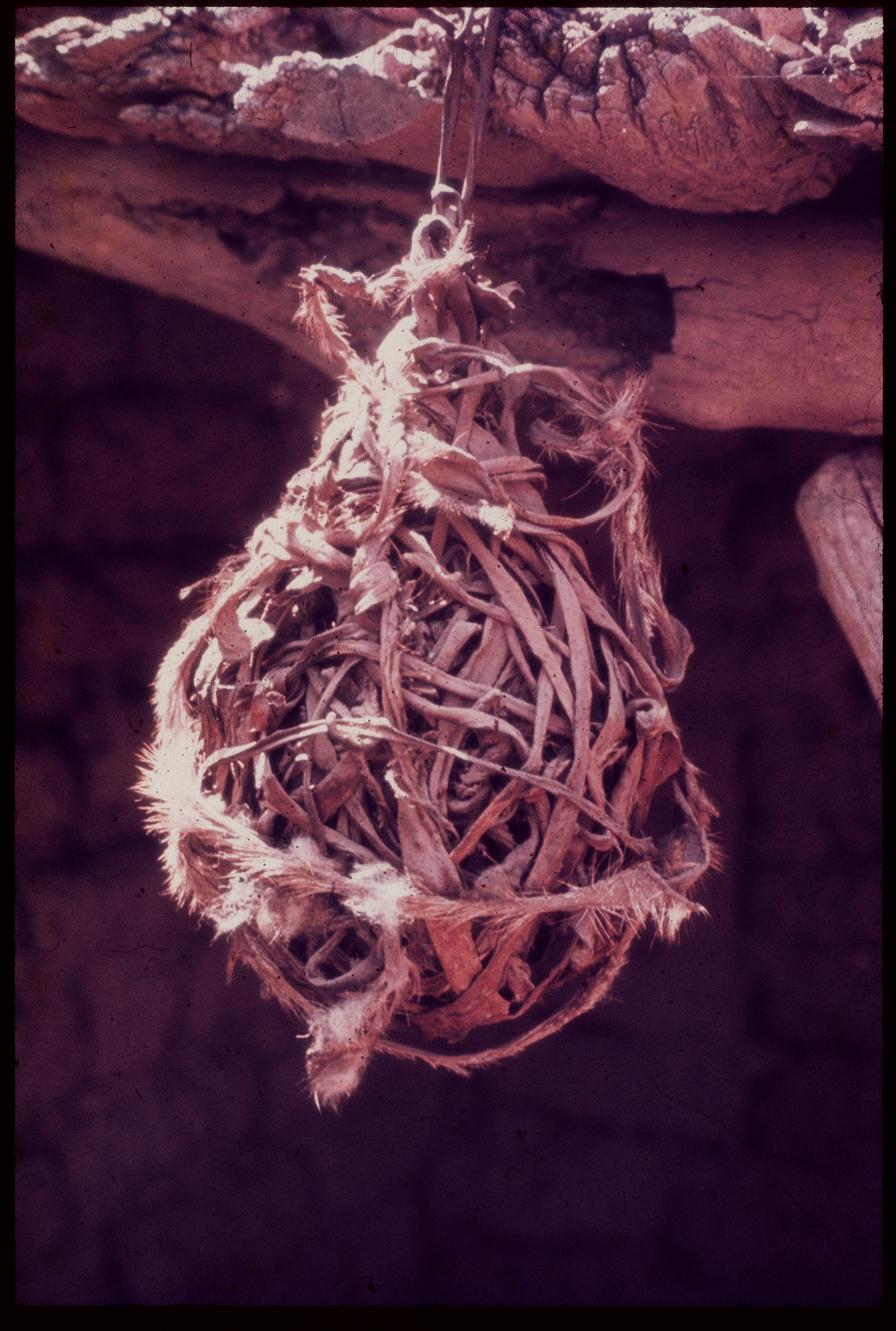
Kakare, a magic object to secure a prosperous hunt.

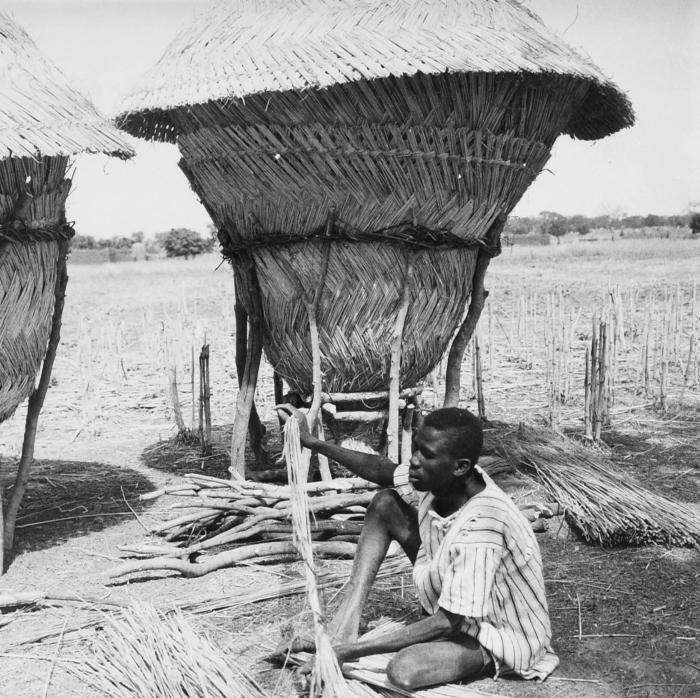
A man is preparing the wickerwork for a new storage shed.

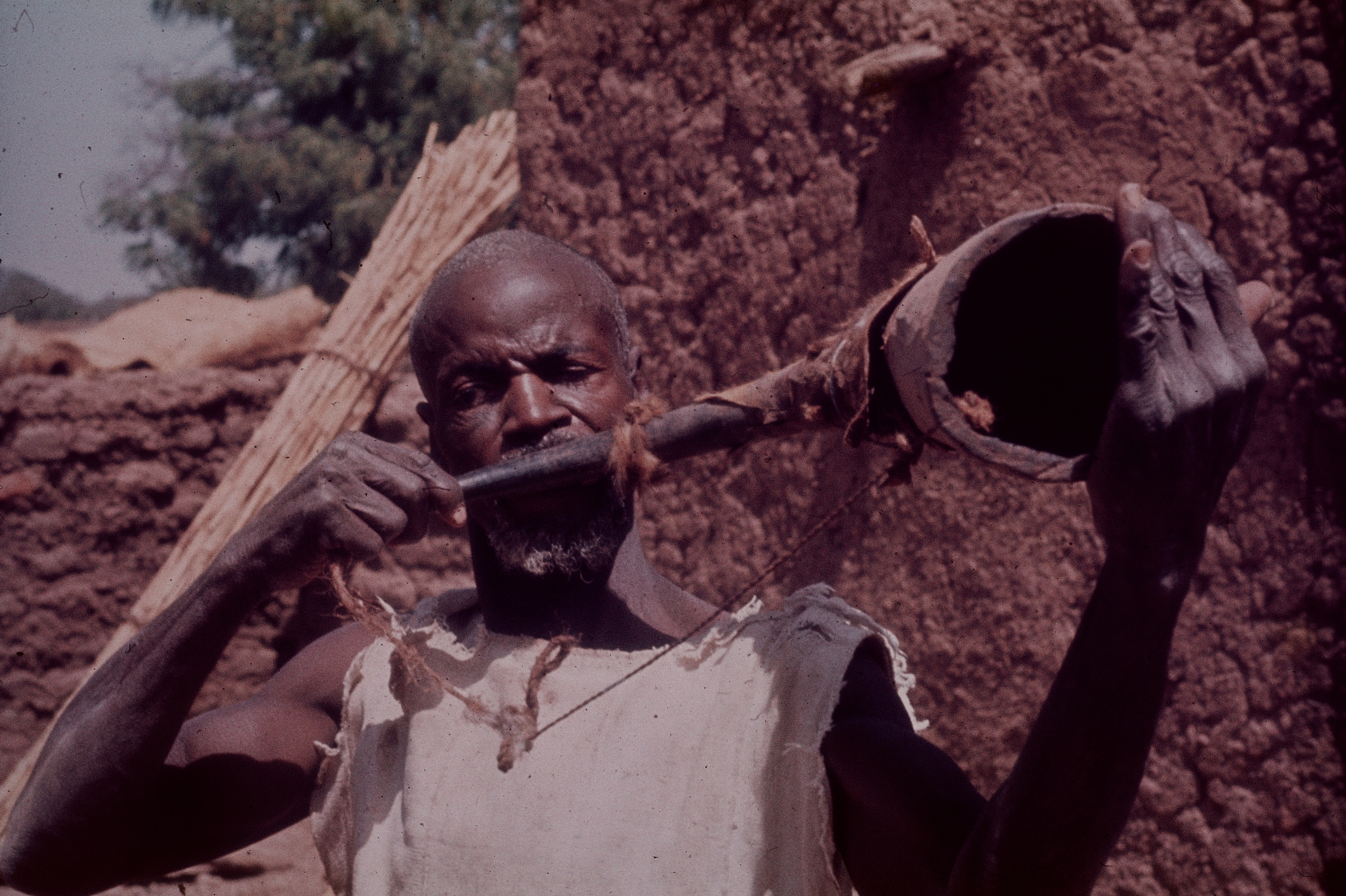
A man is sounding the warhorn.

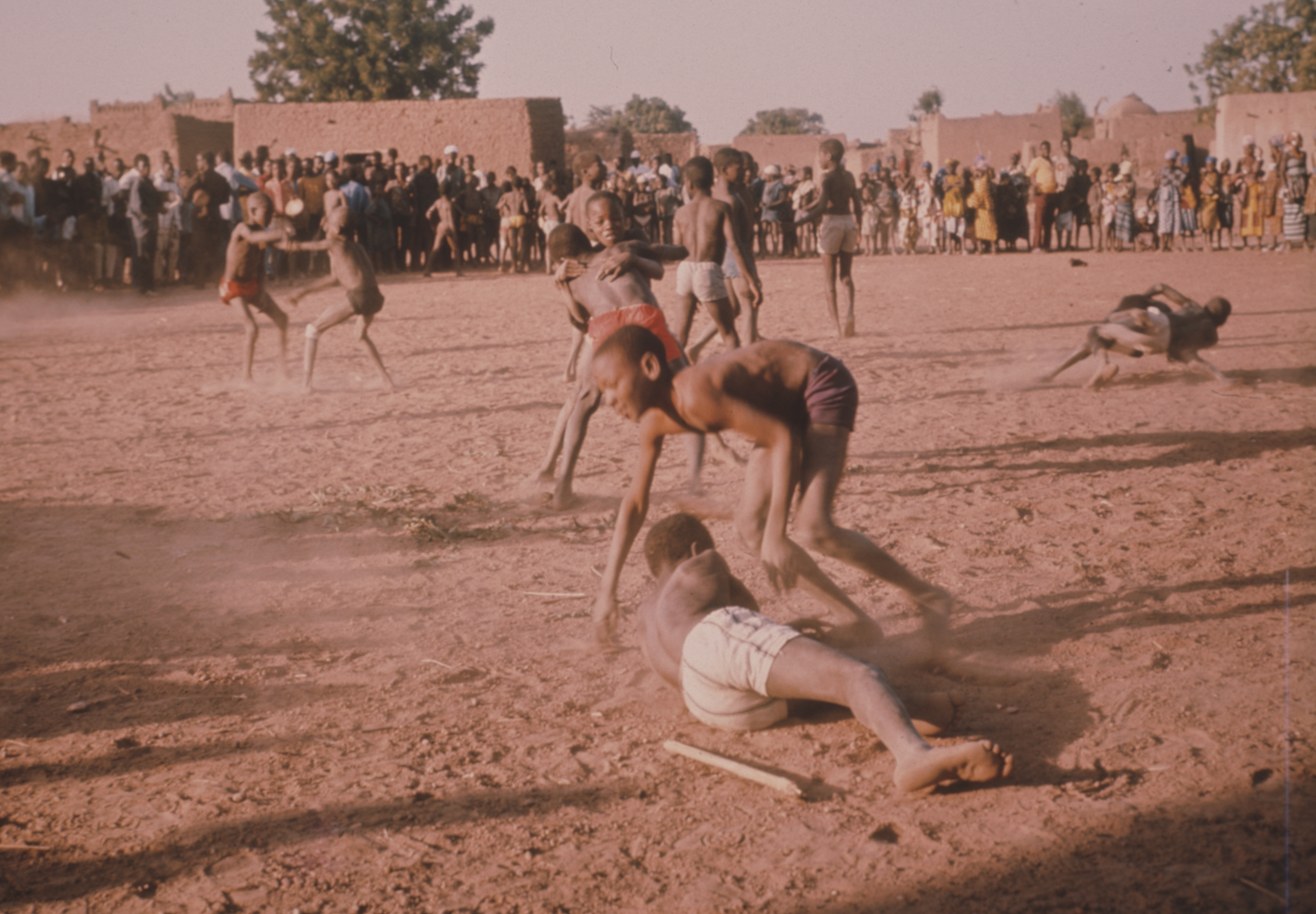
Two youngsters get ready for a wrestling match accompanied by drummers.

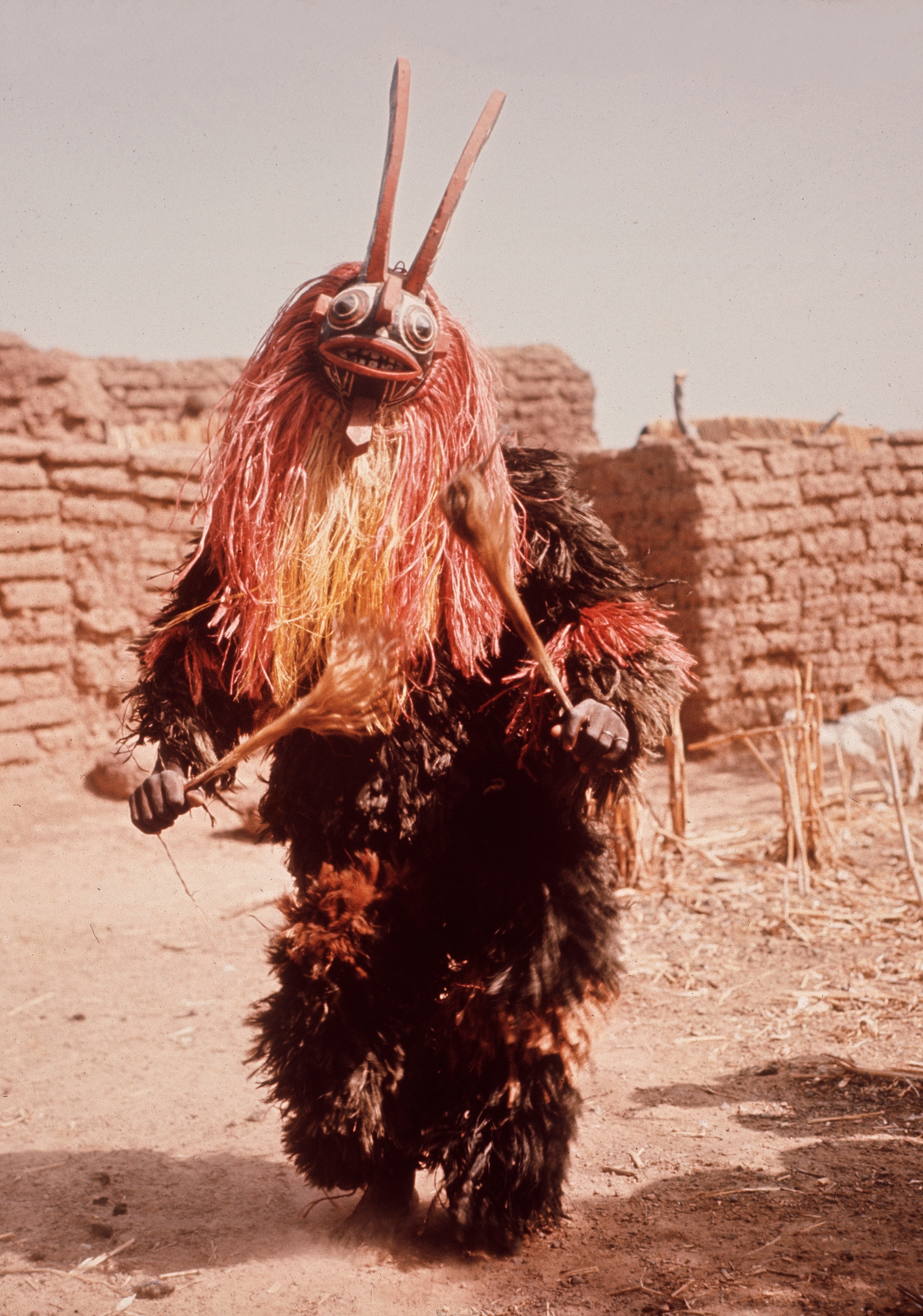
A dancing man-woman in an orange antelope mask with two horns.

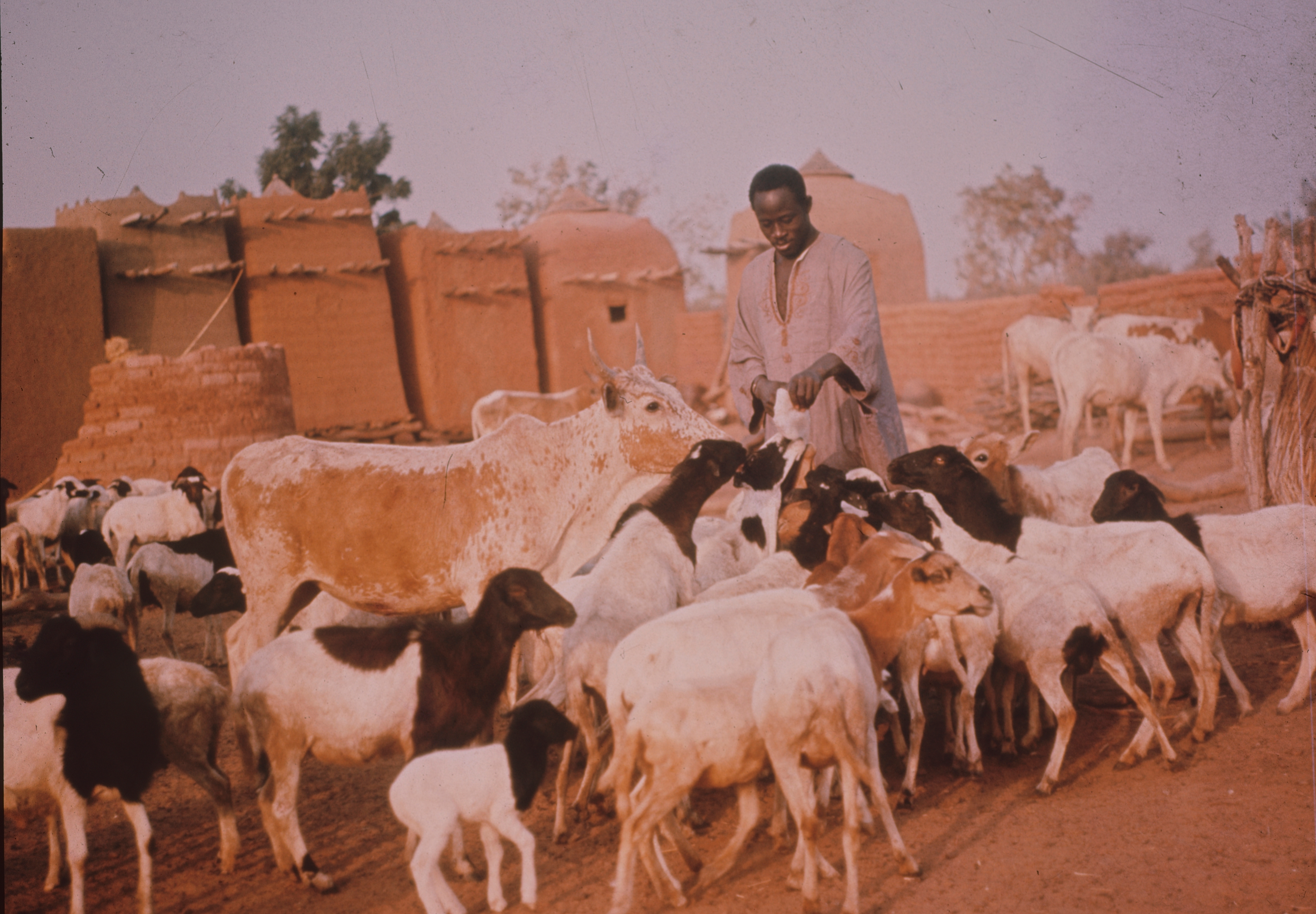
A shepherd feeds goats and a zebus.

== Publications ==
His publications include:

- Broekhuijse, Johan Theodorus (c. 1960). De Papoea migrant in Hollandia : (urbanisation of Hollandia) (in Dutch). Amsterdam: Afdeling Culturele en Physische Anthropologie van het Koninklijk Instituut voor de Tropen. OCLC 64176373. 158 pages.
- Broekhuijse, Johan Theodorus (1967). De Wiligiman-Dani: een cultureel-anthropologische studie over religie en oorlogvoering in de Baliem-vallei (in Dutch). Tilburg: Gianotten. OCLC 4106712. Dutch PhD Dissertation Utrecht University, 299 pages.
- Broekhuijse, Jan; Terrible, Marin; Bafo, Edgar (1985). Désertification et auto-suffisance alimentaire : une vue de la base (in French). Oegstgeest: Cebemo. OCLC 65926223. On Burkina Faso, 260 pages.
- Broekhuijse, J. Th.; Sall, Alioune (1989). The organization of rural society in the Sahel. Bulletin (Koninklijk Instituut voor de Tropen), 314a. Amsterdam: Royal Tropical Institute. ISBN 9789068328035. OCLC 21372499. 44 pages.
  - Broekhuijse, J. Th.; Sall, Alioune (1989). L'organisation du monde rural Sahélien. Bulletin ..., 314 (in French). Amsterdam: Institut Royal des Tropiques, Programme de Développement Rural. ISBN 9789068320251. OCLC 906572193. 43 pages.
- Broekhuijse, J. Th. (1996). "De Harvard-Peabody-expeditie in de Baliemvallei". In Schoorl, J. W. (ed.). Besturen in Nederlands-Nieuw-Guinea, 1945-1962 : ontwikkelingswerk in een periode van politieke onrust (in Dutch). Leiden: KITLV Uitgeverij. pp. 128–148. ISBN 9789067180931. OCLC 905442840. Reports by 17 former civil servants on their work in Dutch New Guinea, 658 pages.
- Broekhuijse, J. Th. (1998). Monografie van de Mossi: noordelijk plateau – Sanmatenga, Burkina Faso (in Dutch). Amsterdam: Koninklijk Instituut voor de Tropen. ISBN 9789068321197. OCLC 68035342. 411 pages.
- Broekhuijse, J. Th. (2009). Memorie van overgave : een wijsgerig-anthropologisch onderzoek naar de mentale structuren die het menselijk leven aansturen en ordenen in religie en cultuur (in Dutch). Noorden: Uitgeverij Bert Post. ISBN 9789070376710. OCLC 495688795. 384 pages.
- Broekhuijse, J. Th. (2020). De Harvard-Peabody Expeditie. Naar de Dani van de Baliem-vallei : ethnografische en autobiografische notities, exploratieressort oostelijk bergland, Nieuw-Guinea (in Dutch). Self-published. ISBN 9781616272654. OCLC 1182559673. 458 pages.

== Archives ==
- "Johan Theodorus Broekhuijse Archive (KITLV)". Leiden University.. On Broekhuijse's work as a civil servant in Hollandia, the Baliem valley and the Schouten Islands, 1937–1966.
- "Collection guide Johan Theodorus Broekhuijse Archive (KITLV) (ubl309)". digitalcollections.universiteitleiden.nl.
- "Broekhuijse J.T. (Johan Theodorus) Dr". collectie.wereldculturen.nl. Nationaal Museum van Wereldculturen. Photographic collection of Broekhuijse kept at this museum.
