= Ika Hands =

1988 film by Robert Gardner

- Directed by: Robert Gardner
- Distributed by: Documentary Educational Resources
- Release date: 1988
- Running time: 58 minutes
- Country: U.S.
- Language: English

Ika Hands is a 1988 film by ethnographic filmmaker Robert Gardner.

This film was shot in the Sierra Nevada de Santa Marta of Northern Colombia. The people in it may be the only survivors of the Tairona. At an informational level, the film shows the rounds of daily life while it attempts to disclose the interior life of a leading figure in the community portrayed. It does so by using a camera in a way that Robert Gardner says, in his brief introduction, no camera has yet been designed to do. What is seen is a man who is part mystic, part priest, and part ordinary householder, performing rituals and offering prayers in lonely and seemingly painful meditation, often accompanied by his own chanting and singing. There is an attempt with this film to find a new form for dealing with not only information, but feelings and mood.
