= The Impulse to Preserve =

Book by Robert Gardner

The Impulse to Preserve: Reflections of a Filmmaker
- Author: Robert Gardner
- Language: English
- Genre: Memoir
- Publication date: 2006

The Impulse to Preserve: Reflections of a Filmmaker is Robert Gardner's 2006 memoir about his career creating actuality films. The book's title comes from the Philip Larkin quotation: "The impulse to preserve lies at the bottom of all art."
