= A Wife Among Wives =

1981 documentary by Judith and David MacDougall

A Wife Among Wives is a 1981 ethnographic documentary produced by filmmakers Judith and David MacDougall. It is about the dynamics of polyamorous marriage in a small Turkana village in Kenya. The film premiered at the 1981 Margaret Mead Film Festival. It has a runtime of 72 minutes.

== Synopsis ==
A Wife Among Wives is an ethnographic documentary that is shot in a non-linear narrative, following the stories of several families. This film focuses on the women of the Turkana village in Kenya and their roles, as well as marriage rituals and dynamics. The film follows several families, focusing on what the females of the households have to say about being in a polygynous marriage with multiple wives and one husband. The women describe how the system of polygyny actually benefits the women in the household, and allows them to function as a unit by practicing communal survival, rather than focusing on individuals and their feelings. The climax of the film is an instance in which a young local village girl runs away from her village to escape an arranged marriage to a much older man; However, her family succeeds in tracking her down, and she is married off to the older man at the end of the film.

== Production ==
Judith and David MacDougall are two visual anthropologists that have produced over 20 ethnographic documentaries. They are widely known in the anthropological world as very significant ethnographic filmmakers. A Wife Among Wives was shot as a third chronicle in a trilogy which focused on the Turkana people. It was shot from 1973 to 1974, over a course of 14 months in Turkanaland, in a small Turkana village in Kenya. The MacDougalls resided there while shooting the film.

== Background ==
In Turkana society, women of the family are in charge of building homesteads. Since they are pastoralists, families move often to allow their livestock to graze fresh pastures. Homesteads are difficult to build, and re-building them several times a year is a difficult task to surmount for one woman alone. Because of this, polygyny is the norm in this Turkana village. Multiple women in one family are able to band together to build homesteads and tend to livestock and farmlands, as well as raise the children and teach them how to complete their tasks. A Turkana man with only one wife is seen as a disgrace and a misfortune.

== Reception ==
A Wife Among Wives is widely used as viewing material at many classrooms and universities. This film was chosen for screening at the Margaret Mead Film Festival, as well as the Field Museum's Anthropology Film Festival, and the Festival dei Popoli in Florence, Italy. In 2005, the film was shown at the Taiwan International Ethnographic Film Festival, as part of the "Director Spotlight" which showcased the work of Judith and David MacDougall.

== Bibliography ==
- MacDougall, D., Taylor, L., MacDougall, D., & Anthropology Online. (1998). Transcultural cinema. Princeton, N.J: Princeton University Press.
- Henley, Paul (2020). "Reflexivity and participation. The films of David and Judith MacDougall in Africa and Australia". Beyond observation. A history of authorship in ethnographic film. Manchester University Press. doi:10.7765/9781526147295.00013. ISBN 9781526147295.
