= Hauka =

Religious movement in French colonial Africa

The Hauka movement is a religious movement which arose in French colonial Africa. It consists of ceremonies, including mimicry and dancing, in which the participants perform the elaborate military ceremonies of their colonial occupiers. It was depicted in the 1955 short film Les maîtres fous (The Mad Masters) directed by Jean Rouch, a well-known French film director and ethnologist. Hauka was popular in the late colonial and early post-colonial era, but the practice has since dwindled. However, as of the late 2010s, ceremonies continue to be practiced in certain circles in Niamey.

They were founded after the French arrived to the Songhay region in 1898. The Hauka emerged out of a previous "possession cult" of the Songhai people, which was well established in the region. Hauka emerged in the 1920s when the French consolidated their power; the first Hauka medium appeared in 1925. According to some anthropologists, the movement was a form of resistance that began in Niger, but spread to other parts of Africa. They say this pageant, though historic, was largely done to mock the settlers' authority by stealing their powers. Hauka members were not trying to emulate Europeans, but were trying to extract their life force.

This stance has been heavily criticized by anthropologist James G. Ferguson, who finds this imitation not about importing colonialism into indigenous culture, but as a way to gain rights and status in the colonial society. The adoption of European customs was not a form of resistance, but to be "respected by the Europeans."

== See also ==
- Cargo cult
- Ghost dance
