= Visual Anthropology (journal) =

- Discipline: Anthropology
- Language: English
- Edited by: Paul Hockings

Publication details
- History: 1987–present
- Publisher: Routledge
- Frequency: 5/year

Standard abbreviations
- ISO 4: Vis. Anthropol.

Indexing
- ISSN: 0894-9468 (print); 1545-5920 (web)
- LCCN: 88641376
- OCLC no.: 16318487

Links
- Journal homepage; Online access; Online archive

Visual Anthropology is a peer-reviewed academic journal covering the visual area of cultural anthropology and closely related fields, particularly film studies and art history, as well as the history of visual anthropology itself. It was established in 1987 by Jay Ruby, who edited the first three volumes. Since 1991 the editor-in-chief has been Paul Hockings. The journal was initially published by Gordon & Breach, but since 2002 it has been published by Routledge. Initially a quarterly, publication frequency was increased to five issues a year in 2005.

In 2008 Gareth Davey analysed the content of the first twenty volumes. He found that although 48% of papers had originated in the United States, "[t]he articles ... covered 80 countries, authored by scholars in 25 countries." Among all contributors to these volumes, 57% were male and 43% female. Of those who were in academic institutions, 49% were in anthropology departments, while a further 17% were in media studies.

== Abstracting and indexing ==
The journal is abstracted and indexed in:

- EBSCO databases
- Emerging Sources Citation Index
- Index Islamicus
- International Bibliography of Periodical Literature
- International Bibliography of the Social Sciences
- Modern Language Association Database
- Scopus
