= Forest of Bliss =

1986 documentary film

- Directed by: Robert Gardner
- Distributed by: Documentary Educational Resources
- Release date: 1986
- Running time: 90 min.
- Country: United States
- Language: English

Forest of Bliss is a 1986 documentary film by ethnographic filmmaker Robert Gardner about everyday life in Benares, India.

== Production ==
Still photographers Jane Tuckerman and Christopher James accompanied Gardner to Benares to photograph the city while the film was being made.
