= Les maîtres fous =

- Directed by: Jean Rouch
- Release date: 1955
- Running time: 28 minutes 36 minutes (long cut)
- Country: France
- Language: French

Les maîtres fous (French: [le mɛːtʁ fu]; "The Mad Masters") is a 1955 short film directed by Jean Rouch, a well-known French film director and ethnologist. It is a docufiction, his first ethnofiction, a genre he is considered to have created.

== Historical background ==
The subject of the film was the Hauka movement. The Hauka movement consisted of mimicry and dancing to become possessed by British Colonial administrators. The participants performed the same elaborate military ceremonies of their colonial occupiers, but in more of a trance than true recreation.

The Hauka movement, according to some anthropologists was a form of resistance that began in Niger, but spread to other parts of Africa. According to some anthropologists, this pageant, though historic, was largely done to mock their authority by stealing their powers. Hauka members were not trying to emulate Europeans, but were trying to extract their life force – something "entirely African".

This stance has been heavily criticized by anthropologist James G. Ferguson who finds this imitation not about importing colonialism into indigenous culture, but more a way to gain rights and status in the colonial society. The adoption of European customs was not so much a form of resistance, but to be "respected by the Europeans."

Les maîtres fous offended both colonial authorities and African students alike. Indeed, the film was so controversial that it was banned first in Niger, and then in British territories including Ghana. The film was considered offensive to colonial authorities because of the Africans' blatant attempts to mimic and mock the "white oppressors". On the other hand, African students, teachers, and directors found the film to perpetrate an "exotic racism" of the African people.

== See also ==
- Visual anthropology
- Ethnographic film
- Ethnofiction
- Docufiction

== See also ==
- Maitres-fous.net – a web site devoted to the study of Jean Rouch's films
- Les maîtres fous at Savage Minds (notes and queries in anthropology)
- Les maîtres fous – article at Documentary (Educational Resources)
- The Poesis of Mimesis in Les maîtres fous – article by Prerana Reddy
- The Ethnographer's Eye: Ways of Seeing in Anthropology – article by Anna Grimshaw
- Les maîtres fous – article by Natalie Mildbrodt
- Jean Rouch's Ciné-Ethnography: at the conjunction of research, poetry and politics – article by Lorraine Mortimer
