= Himalayan Herders =

- Directed by: John Melville Bishop; Naomi Bishop
- Written by: Naomi Bishop
- Produced by: John Melville Bishop; Naomi Bishop
- Narrated by: Naomi Bishop
- Production company: Documentary Educational Resources
- Release date: 1997
- Running time: 76 minutes

Himalayan Herders is a 1997 documentary film directed by John Melville Bishop and Naomi Bishop that focuses on what life is like in the Nepal village, Melamchi.

== Synopsis ==
The film focuses on the daily life of the villagers; how life has changed over the years; spiritual and cultural traditions; as well as its economy. The film follows a non-linear structure, talks about one tradition or event in the village and then changes to a new one when finished without overarching story. Utilizing narration by Naomi Bishop she explains many aspects of live in the village. The film also includes interviews from many of the village residents helping the viewer get a better perspective on the Nepal village.

The film opens up with two men setting up a long white flag that goes down the flag pole. They set up the flag on the edge of a cliff that overlooks a valley and the houses in the distance. It is Tibetan New Year. A few more men then enter the scene. They start a small fire in a bowel, they then ring a bell, sing a song, and throw flour into the air to bless the flag. The village is located in the Himalayan Mountains at an altitude of 8,500 feet; the villagers raise an animal that thrives at this altitude. The animal they raise is the zomo, it is a hybrid between a yak and a cow, a zomo can produce more milk than either species.

== Cast ==
Narrated by Naomi Bishop.

== Production ==
Naomi Bishop wrote an article about the village of Melamchi, focusing particularly on their farming of zomo in 1989; it was published Human Ecology 17th volume. In the article she talks about topics that are not covered in the film, and goes into more details with topics discussed in the film. One of the topics that is discussed in the article and not included in the film is that the fields that zomo herders live in are away from the village in huts called Goths. The majority of the film was shot between the years 1986–1989; the rest of the film was shot between the years 1971–1972 and in 1993.

== Reception ==
The film was reviewed in American Anthropologist in 1998 by James Fisher. He said the film "Sometimes... raise more questions than they answer." Despite this criticism, James said that it accurately tells the story of the people of this village and is one of the best ethnographic films about Nepal.
