= Rivers of Sand =

- Directed by: Robert Gardner
- Distributed by: Phoenix Films
- Release date: 1973
- Running time: 83 min.
- Country: United States
- Language: English

Rivers of Sand is a 1973 documentary film by Robert Gardner that portrays the Hamar people of southwestern Ethiopia.

== See also ==
- List of American films of 1973
