= Robert Gardner (anthropologist) =

Ethnographic documentary filmmaker (1925–2014)

- Born: Robert Grosvenor Gardner; November 5, 1925; Brookline, Massachusetts, U.S.
- Died: June 21, 2014 (aged 88); Cambridge, Massachusetts, U.S.
- Education: Harvard University (AB, AM)
- Occupations: Academic, Anthropologist, Documentarian
- Spouse: Adele Pressman (m. 1983)
- Children: 5
- Writing career
- Period: 1951–2000
- Notable works: Dead Birds; Forest of Bliss
- Website: www.robertgardner.net

Robert Grosvenor Gardner (November 5, 1925 – June 21, 2014) was an American academic, anthropologist, and documentary filmmaker who was director of the Film Study Center at Harvard University from 1956 to 1997. Gardner was known for his work in visual anthropology and films including the National Film Registry inductee Dead Birds and Forest of Bliss. In 2011, a retrospective of his work was held at Film Forum, New York.

== Biography ==
Gardner was the sixth child and third son, born in the home of his grandmother Isabella Stewart Gardner. He was a cousin of poet Robert Lowell.

After graduating with a Bachelor of Arts from Harvard University in 1947, Gardner became an assistant to Thomas Whittemore at Harvard's Fogg Museum, traveling to Anatolia, Faiyum, and London to work with Coptic textiles and restore Byzantine art. He briefly taught medieval art and history at the College of Puget Sound in Washington state, where he studied the writings of anthropologist Ruth Benedict. He then earned an MA in anthropology from Harvard. During this period, he joined an expedition among Kalahari Desert Bushmen, photographing, filming, and conducting preliminary fieldwork. In 1957, he founded The Film Study Center, a production and research unit at the Peabody Museum at Harvard, where he made documentary films until he left the center in 1997.

He lived in Cambridge, Massachusetts with his wife, psychiatrist Dr. Adele Pressman, and children.

The Peabody Museum of Archaeology and Ethnology awards the Robert Gardner Fellowship in Photography, worth $50,000.

=== Screening Room ===
Gardner also hosted a Boston television series from 1972 to 1981 on an ABC affiliate, featuring works by independent filmmakers across animation (Jan Lenica, Caroline Leaf, John and Faith Hubley), experimental (Hollis Frampton, Standish Lawder), and documentary film (Les Blank, Hilary Harris).

== Filmography ==
- Blunden Harbour (1951)
- Dances of the Kwakiutl (1951)
- Mark Tobey (1952)
- The Hunters (1957)
- Dead Birds (1963)
- Marathon (1964)
- The Nuer (1971)
- Mark Tobey Abroad (1973)
- Rivers of Sand (1973)
- Altar of Fire (1976)
- Deep Hearts (1981)
- Sons of Shiva (1985)
- Forest of Bliss (1986)
- Ika Hands (1988)
- Dancing With Miklos (1993)
- Passenger (1998)
- Scully in Malaga (1998)
- Good to Pull (Bon a Tirer) (2000)

== Related filmmakers ==
- Tim Asch
- John Marshall

== Bibliography ==
- Gardner, Robert. 2006. The Impulse to Preserve: Reflections of a Filmmaker. Other Press.
- The Cinema of Robert Gardner, by Ilisa Barbash, Lucien Taylor. Berg, 2007. ISBN 978-1-84520-774-8.
- Harry Tomicek. 1991 Gardner Österreichisches Filmmuseum. (In German)
