= Judith MacDougall =

American anthropologist (born 1938)

- Born: 1938 (age 87–88)
- Education: University of California, Los Angeles
- Known for: Ethnographic films in Africa, India and Australia; The Wedding Camels
- Spouse: David MacDougall
- Awards: Film Prize by Royal Anthropological Institute for The Wedding Camels (1980)
- Scientific career
- Fields: Visual anthropology, social anthropology, documentary films

Judith MacDougall (born 1938) is an American visual anthropologist and documentary filmmaker, who has made over 20 ethnographic films in Africa, Australia and India. Also a noted still photographer, she documented the tenor of popular culture in Texas in the early 1970s. For many of the films, she worked with her husband, David MacDougall, also an anthropologist and a documentary filmmaker. Both of them are considered among the most significant anthropological filmmakers in the English-speaking world and pioneers of observational cinema

== Early life and education ==
MacDougall was born in the United States. She enrolled in the ethnographic film program at the University of California, Los Angeles, where she met her husband, David. Together, they would go on to make some 20 ethnographic films, across Australia, Africa, and India.

== Filmography ==
- Indians and Chiefs ( 1967)
- The House-Opening (1977)
- The Wedding Camels (1977)
- Lorang's Way (1979)
- Takeover (1980)
- A Wife Among Wives (1981)
- Three Horsemen (1982)
- Stockman's Strategy (1984)
- Collum Calling Canberra (1984)
- Sunny and the Dark Horse (1986)
- Photo Wallahs (1991)
- Diyas (2001)
- The Art of Regret (2007)
- Awareness (2010)
- The Queen of the Hills (2022)

== Bibliography ==
- Blount, Ben G. (May 10, 1984). "Turkana Conversations Trilogy. 3 color films by David MacDougall and Judith MacDougall". American Anthropologist. 86 (3): 803–806. doi:10.1525/aa.1984.86.3.02a01050.
- Myers, Fred R. (1988). "From Ethnography to Metaphor: Recent Films from David and Judith MacDougall". Cultural Anthropology. 3 (2): 205–220. doi:10.1525/can.1988.3.2.02a00050. JSTOR 656351.
- Loizos, Peter (1993). Innovation in Ethnographic Film: From Innocence to Self-Consciousness 1955-1985. University of Chicago Press. ISBN 0226492273.
- MacDougall, David (1999). Transcultural Cinema. Princeton University Press. ISBN 9780691012346.
- MacDougall, David (2006). The Corporeal Image: Film, Ethnography, and the Senses. Princeton University Press. ISBN 9780691121567.
- Grimshaw, Anna; Ravetz, Amanda (2009). Observational Cinema. Indiana University Press. ISBN 9780253354242.
- MacDougall, David (2019). The Looking Machine: Essays on Cinema, Anthropology and Documentary Filmmaking. Manchester University Press. ISBN 978-1526134110.
- MacDougall, David (2022). The Art of the Observer . Manchester University Press. ISBN 978-152616535-0
