= Jay Ruby =

American scholar (1935–2022)

- Born: October 25, 1935; Oak Park, Illinois, U.S.
- Died: February 23, 2022 (aged 86)

Academic background
- Education: University of California, Los Angeles

Academic work
- Discipline: Anthropology
- Institutions: Temple University

Jay Ruby (October 25, 1935 – February 23, 2022) was an American scholar who was a professor in the Department of Anthropology at Temple University until his retirement in 2003. He received his B.A. in history (1960) and Ph.D. in anthropology (1969) from the University of California, Los Angeles.

Ruby was a leader in the field of visual anthropology. He died on February 23, 2022, at the age of 86.

== Fieldwork and research ==
As an archaeologist, Ruby conducted excavations in the American Southwest, West Mexico and the Republic of the Sudan. As a music critic and journalist, he interviewed pop music musicians, wrote album reviews and articles for the magazine Jazz and Pop. As an ethnographer of visual culture, he conducted long term participant-observation in Central Pennsylvania and Oak Park, a suburb of Chicago. Larry Gross, USC and Ruby edited enhanced ebook, The Complete Sol Worth. In the fall of 2008, Ruby began a study of Bohemian Southern California that resulted in three books (see below).

== Filmography ==
- A Country Auction: The Paul V. Leitzel Sale (1983)
- Can I Get A Quarter? (1983)
- Rebekah and Sophie: A Lesbian Family (2005)
- Taylor Family Portrait (2005)
- Dear Old Oak Parkers (2006)
- Oak Park Regional Housing Center (2006)
- Val (2006)
- Country Auction Study Film: Reflexive Musings (2010)

== Major publications ==
- Editor, A Crack in the Mirror: Reflexive Perspectives in Anthropology. Philadelphia: University of Pennsylvania Press. 1982
- Editor, Robert J. Flaherty, A Biography. Written by Paul Rotha. Philadelphia: University of Pennsylvania Press. 1983
- Editor with Larry Gross and John Katz. Image Ethics: The Moral Rights of Subjects in Photographs, Film and Television. New York: Oxford University Press. 1988
- Editor, The Cinema of John Marshall, Routledge. 1993
- Secure the Shadow: Death and Photography in America. Cambridge: MIT Press. 1995
- The World of Francis Cooper: Nineteenth Century Pennsylvania Photographer. University Park: Penn State University Press. 1999
- Picturing Culture: Essays on Film and Anthropology. Chicago: University of Chicago Press. 2000 (ISBN 9780226730998)
- Editor with Larry Gross and John Katz. Image Ethics in the Digital World. Minneapolis: University of Minnesota Press. 2003
- Editor with Marcus Banks. Made to Be Seen: Historical Perspectives on Visual Anthropology. Chicago: University of Chicago Press. 2011
- Coffee House Positano: A Bohemian Oasis in Malibu 1957–1962. Boulder: University of Colorado Press. 2013 (ISBN 978-1-60732-272-6)
- Editor with Larry Gross. The Complete Sol Worth.Los Angeles:USC Annenberg Press. 2013 (ISBN 978-1-62517-188-7)
- The Property: Malibu's Other Colony. 2016. (ISBN 978-0692493526)
- Editor, Bohemia in Southern California. (ISBN 978-1938537103)

== See also ==
- Tim Asch
- Barbara Myerhoff
