= Documentary Educational Resources =

American nonprofit in film and video

Documentary Educational Resources (DER), originally called the Center for Documentary Anthropology, is a US non-profit producer and distributor of film and video in anthropology and ethnology. It has been described by the Harvard Film Archive as "one of the most historically important resources of ethnographic film in the world today".

It was founded in 1968 by independent filmmakers John Marshall and Timothy Asch and is based in Watertown, Massachusetts. Its mission is "to promote thought-provoking documentary film and media for learning about the people and cultures of the world.".

In 2008 it donated 700 films to the Harvard Film Archive.
