= Linda Hunt (disambiguation) =

Linda Hunt is the name of:

- Linda Hunt (born 1945), American actress
- Linda Hunt (politician), American politician elected in 2024
- Linda Hunt (reporter), 20th-21st century journalist and author
- Linda M. Hunt, American medical anthropologist
