= Airiman =

Airiman were an Indigenous Australian tribe from Australia's Northern Territory.

== Country ==
According to Norman Tindale, the Airiman's traditional lands encompassed 800 square miles (2,100 km^{2}). Baldwin Spencer encountered this tribe at the headwaters of the Fitzmaurice River. They were later described by D. S. Davidson who, Tindale claims, incorrectly took them to be Ngarinman.

== Sources ==
- Davidson, D. S. (January–June 1935). "Archaeological Problems of Northern Australia". The Journal of the Royal Anthropological Institute of Great Britain and Ireland. 65: 145–183. doi:10.2307/2843847. JSTOR 2843847.
- Spencer, Baldwin (1914). Native tribes of the Northern Territory of Australia. Macmillan.
- Tindale, Norman Barnett (1974). "Airiman (NT)". Aboriginal Tribes of Australia: Their Terrain, Environmental Controls, Distribution, Limits, and Proper Names. Australian National University. ISBN 978-0-708-10741-6. Archived from the original on 20 March 2020.
