= Lennard J. Davis =

American academic

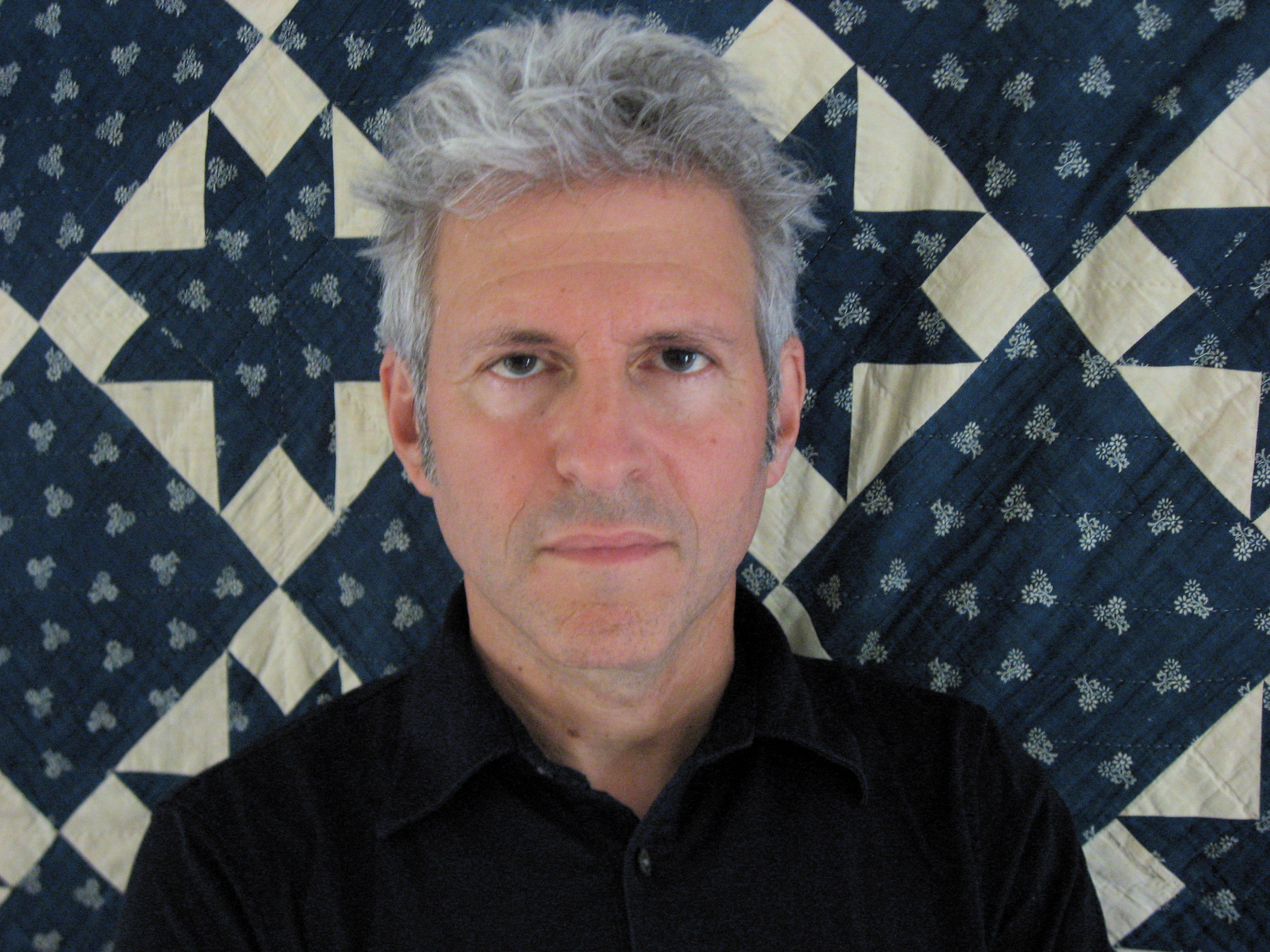
Lennard J. Davis in 2009

Lennard J. Davis is an American specialist in disability studies and a Distinguished Professor Emeritus of English at the University of Illinois at Chicago, School of Arts and Sciences, and also Professor of Disability and Human Development in the School of Applied Health Sciences and Professor of Medical Education in the University of Illinois College of Medicine.

He received degrees of B.A., M.A., and M.Phil. at Columbia University, as well as a PhD in the Department of English and Comparative Literature in 1976. His dissertation director was Edward Said.

== Early life ==
Davis's father, Morris Davis was a Jewish immigrant from London, a Deaf race walker, two-time U.S. champion (1935 and 1936) in the 15-kilometer and the U.S. champion in the 50-kilometer (1930)https://jdcc.org/deaf-jews-sports/ and his mother, Eva Weintrobe, was a Jewish Deaf immigrant from Liverpool.

== Publications ==
In English literature, he has written two works on the novel, Factual Fictions: The Origins of the English Novel (Columbia U. Press, 1983, rpt. University of Pennsylvania Press, 1996 ISBN) and Resisting Novels: Fiction and Ideology (Routledge, 1987, rpt. University of Pennsylvania Press, 2001) and been co-editor of Left Politics and the Literary Profession.

His works on disability include Enforcing Normalcy: Disability, Deafness, and the Body (Verso, 1995), and The Disability Studies Reader (Routledge, 5th edition 2016). He edited an introduction to disability studies entitled Beginning with Disability: A Primer (Routledge, 2017) A collection of his essays entitled Bending Over Backwards: Disability, Dismodernism, and Other Difficult Positions was published by New York University Press in August 2002. He is also the author of The End of Normal: Identity in a Biocultural Era (U of Michigan, 2014). He wrote a history of the passage of the Americans with Disabilities Act titled Enabling Acts: The Hidden Story of How the Americans with Disabilities Act Gave the Largest US Minority Its Rights, published by Beacon Press in July 2015 on the 25th anniversary of that act.

His memoir My Sense of Silence (University of Illinois Press, 2000), was chosen Editor's Choice Book for the Chicago Tribune, selected for the National Book Award for 2000. He has appeared on National Public Radio's "Fresh Air" to discuss the memoir, which describes his childhood in a deaf family. Davis has also edited his parents' correspondence, Shall I Say a Kiss: The Courtship Letters of a Deaf Couple. (Gallaudet University Press, 1999).

Davis is a co-founder of the Modern Language Association's Committee on Disability Issues in the Profession, and he is on the board of several academic journals. Having written widely for newspapers and magazines, Davis is also the author of a novel entitled The Sonnets (State University of New York Press, March 2001).

His book Go Ask Your Father: One Man's Obsession with Finding Himself, His Origins, and the Meaning of Life Through Genetic Testing was published in 2009 by Bantam/Dell. Obsession: A History appeared in Fall 2009 by University of Chicago Press.

His fiction includes The Sonnets: A Novel (SUNY Press, 2002).

Poor Things: How Those with Money Depict Those Without It is his latest book was published by Duke University Press in November 2024. https://www.dukeupress.edu/poor-things

== See also ==
- Bioculture
