= William Caudill =

William Caudill may refer to:

- William Abel Caudill, applied medical anthropologist
- William Wayne Caudill, American architect and professor
- Bill Caudill, American baseball pitcher
