= Medical anthropology =

Study of human health and disease, health care systems, and biocultural adaptation

Medical anthropology is the study of "human health and disease, health care systems, and biocultural adaptation" that views humans from multidimensional and ecological perspectives. It is one of the most highly developed areas of anthropology and applied anthropology, and is a subfield of social and cultural anthropology that examines the ways in which culture and society are organized around or influenced by issues of health and health care.

Since 1963, the term "medical anthropology" refers to empirical research and theoretical production in relation to social processes and cultural representations of health, illness and nursing/care practices.

In Europe the terms "anthropology of medicine", "anthropology of health" and "anthropology of illness" have also been used, and "medical anthropology", was also a translation of the 19th century Dutch term "medische anthropologie". This term was chosen by some authors during the 1940s to refer to philosophical studies on health and illness.

== Historical background ==
The relationship between anthropology, medicine and medical practice is well documented. General anthropology occupied a position in the basic medical sciences (which correspond to those subjects known as pre-clinical). However, medical education started to be restricted to the confines of the hospital as a consequence of the development of the clinical gaze and the confinement of patients in observational infirmaries. The hegemony of hospital clinical education and of experimental methodologies, suggested by Claude Bernard, relegate the value of the practitioners' everyday experience, which was previously seen as a source of knowledge represented by the reports called medical geographies and medical topographies both based on ethnographic, demographic, statistical and epidemiological data. After the development of hospital clinical training the basic source of knowledge in medicine was experimental medicine in the hospital and laboratory, and these factors together meant that over time doctors abandoned ethnography as a tool of knowledge. Most, not all because ethnography remained during a large part of the 20th century as a tool of knowledge in primary health care, rural medicine, and in international public health. The abandonment of ethnography by medicine happened when social anthropology adopted ethnography as one of the markers of its professional identity and started to depart from the initial project of general anthropology. The divergence of professional anthropology from medicine was never a complete split. The relationships between the two disciplines remained constant during the 20th century, until the development of modern medical anthropology in the 1960s and 1970s. A book by Saillant & Genest describes development of medical anthropology as a field of study, and some of the main theoretical and intellectual actual debates.

Popular topics that are covered by medical anthropology are mental health, sexual health, pregnancy and birth, aging, addiction, nutrition, disabilities, infectious disease, non-communicable diseases (NCDs), global epidemics and disaster management.

== Medical sociology ==
Peter Conrad notes that medical sociology studies some of the same phenomena as medical anthropology but argues that medical anthropology has different origins, originally studying medicine within non-western cultures and using different methodologies. He argues that there was some convergence between the disciplines, as medical sociology started to adopt some of the methodologies of anthropology such as qualitative research and began to focus more on the patient, and medical anthropology started to focus on western medicine. He argued that more interdisciplinary communication could improve both disciplines.

== Popular medicine and medical systems ==
For much of the 20th century, doctors and medical anthropologists used the concept of popular medicine, or folk medicine to describe the resources, other than the help of health professionals, in which European or Latin American peasants used to resolve health issues. The terms were also used to describe the health practices of indigenous groups in different parts around the world, with emphasis on their ethnobotanical knowledge. This knowledge is fundamental for isolating alkaloids and active pharmacological principles. Furthermore, studying the rituals surrounding popular therapies served to challenge Western psychopathological categories, as well as the relationship in the West between science and religion. Doctors were not trying to turn popular medicine into an anthropological concept, rather they wanted to construct a scientifically based medical concept which they could use to establish the cultural limits of biomedicine. Biomedicine is the application of natural sciences and biology to the diagnosis of a disease. Often in the Western culture, this is ethnomedicine. Examples of this practice can be found in medical archives and oral history projects.

The concept of folk medicine was taken up by professional anthropologists in the first half of the twentieth century to demarcate between magical practices, medicine and religion and to explore the role and the significance of popular healers and their self-medicating practices. For them, popular medicine was a specific cultural feature of some groups of humans which was distinct from the universal practices of biomedicine. If every culture had its own specific popular medicine based on its general cultural features, it would be possible to propose the existence of as many medical systems as there were cultures and develop the comparative study of these systems. Those medical systems which showed none of the syncretic features of European popular medicine were called primitive or pretechnical medicine according to whether they referred to contemporary aboriginal cultures or to cultures predating Classical Greece. Those cultures with a documentary corpus, such as the Tibetan, traditional Chinese or Ayurvedic cultures, were sometimes called systematic medicines. The comparative study of medical systems is known as ethnomedicine, which is the way an illness or disease is treated in one's culture, or, if psychopathology is the object of study, ethnopsychiatry (Beneduce 2007, 2008), transcultural psychiatry (Bibeau, 1997) and anthropology of mental illness (Lézé, 2014).

Under this concept, medical systems are seen as the specific product of each ethnic group's cultural history. Scientific biomedicine becomes another medical system and therefore a cultural form that could be studied as such. This position, which originated in the cultural relativism maintained by cultural anthropology, allowed the debate with medicine and psychiatry to revolve around some fundamental questions:

1. The relative influence of genotypical and phenotypical factors in relation to personality and certain forms of pathology, especially psychiatric and psychosomatic pathologies.
2. The influence of culture on what a society considers to be normal, pathological or abnormal.
3. The verification in different cultures of the universality of the nosological categories of biomedicine and psychiatry.
4. The identification and description of diseases belonging to specific cultures that have not been previously described by clinical medicine. These are known as ethnic disorders and, more recently, as culture-bound syndromes, and include the evil eye and tarantism among European peasants, being possessed or in a state of trance in many cultures, and nervous anorexia, nerves and premenstrual syndrome in Western societies.

Since the end of the 20th century, medical anthropologists understood the problem of cultural representations and social practices related to health, disease and medical care and attention as universal with diverse local forms articulated in transactional processes. The link at the end of this page is included to offer a panorama of current positions in medical anthropology.

== Applied medical anthropology ==
In the United States, Canada, Mexico, and Brazil, collaboration between anthropology and medicine was initially concerned with implementing community health programs among ethnic and cultural minorities and with the qualitative and ethnographic evaluation of health institutions (hospitals and mental hospitals) and primary care services. Regarding the community health programs, the intention was to resolve the problems of establishing these services for a complex mosaic of ethnic groups. The ethnographic evaluation involved analyzing the interclass conflicts within the institutions which had an undesirable effect on their administrative reorganization and their institutional objectives, particularly those conflicts among the doctors, nurses, auxiliary staff and administrative staff. The ethnographic reports show that interclass crises directly affected therapeutic criteria and care of the ill. They also contributed new methodological criteria for evaluating the new institutions resulting from the reforms as well as experimental care techniques such as therapeutic communities.

The ethnographic evidence supported the criticisms of the institutional custodialism and contributed decisively to policies of deinstitutionalizing psychiatric and social care in general and led to in some countries such as Italy, a rethink of the guidelines on education and promoting health.

The empirical answers to these questions led to the anthropologists being involved in many areas. These include: developing international and community health programs in developing countries; evaluating the influence of social and cultural variables in the epidemiology of certain forms of psychiatric pathology (transcultural psychiatry); studying cultural resistance to innovation in therapeutic and care practices; analysing healing practices toward immigrants; and studying traditional healers, folk healers and empirical midwives who may be reinvented as health workers (the so-called barefoot doctors).

Also, since the 1960s, biomedicine in developed countries has been faced by a series of problems which stipulate inspection of predisposing social or cultural factors, which have been reduced to variables in quantitative protocols and subordinated to causal biological or genetic interpretations. Among these the following are of particular note:

a) The transition between a dominant system designed for acute infectious pathology to a system designed for chronic degenerative pathology without any specific etiological therapy.

b) The emergence of the need to develop long term treatment mechanisms and strategies, as opposed to incisive therapeutic treatments.

c) The influence of concepts such as quality of life in relation to classic biomedical therapeutic criteria.

Added to these are the problems associated with implementing community health mechanisms. These problems are perceived initially as tools for fighting against unequal access to health services. However, once a comprehensive service is available to the public, new problems emerge from ethnic, cultural or religious differences, or from differences between age groups, genders or social classes.

If implementing community care mechanisms gives rise to one set of problems, then a whole new set of problems also arises when these same mechanisms are dismantled and the responsibilities which they once assumed are placed back on the shoulders of individual members of society.

In all these fields, local and qualitative ethnographic research is indispensable for understanding the way patients and their social networks incorporate knowledge on health and illness when their experience is nuanced by complex cultural influences. These influences result from the nature of social relations in advanced societies and from the influence of social communication media, especially audiovisual media and advertising.

== Fields ==
As medical anthropology has not standardised, consistent fields have not been established. In general, we may consider the following six basic fields:

- the development of systems of medical knowledge and medical care
- the patient-physician relationship
- the integration of alternative medical systems in culturally diverse environments
- the interaction of social, environmental and biological factors which influence health and illness both in the individual and the community as a whole
- the critical analysis of interaction between psychiatric services and migrant populations
- the impact of biomedicine and biomedical technologies in non-Western settings

Other subjects that have become central to the medical anthropology worldwide are violence and social suffering as well as other issues that involve physical and psychological harm and suffering that are not a result of illness. On the other hand, there are fields that intersect with medical anthropology in terms of research methodology and theoretical production, such as cultural psychiatry and transcultural psychiatry or ethnopsychiatry.

== Training ==
All medical anthropologists are trained in anthropology as their main discipline. Many come from the health professions such as medicine or nursing, whereas others come from the other backgrounds such as psychology, social work, social education or sociology. Cultural and transcultural psychiatrists are trained as anthropologists and, naturally, psychiatric clinicians. Training in medical anthropology is normally acquired at a master's (M.A. or M.Sc.) and doctoral level. An account of postgraduate training courses in different countries can be found on the website of the Society of Medical Anthropology of the American Anthropological Association.

== See also ==
- Biological anthropology
- Critical medical anthropology
- Cultural ecology
- Culture-bound syndrome
- Dental anthropology
- Disability anthropology
- Ecological anthropology
- Epidemiological transition
- Ethnomedicine
- Medical sociology
- William Abel Caudill
