= Sociology of architecture =

Branch of the discipline of sociology

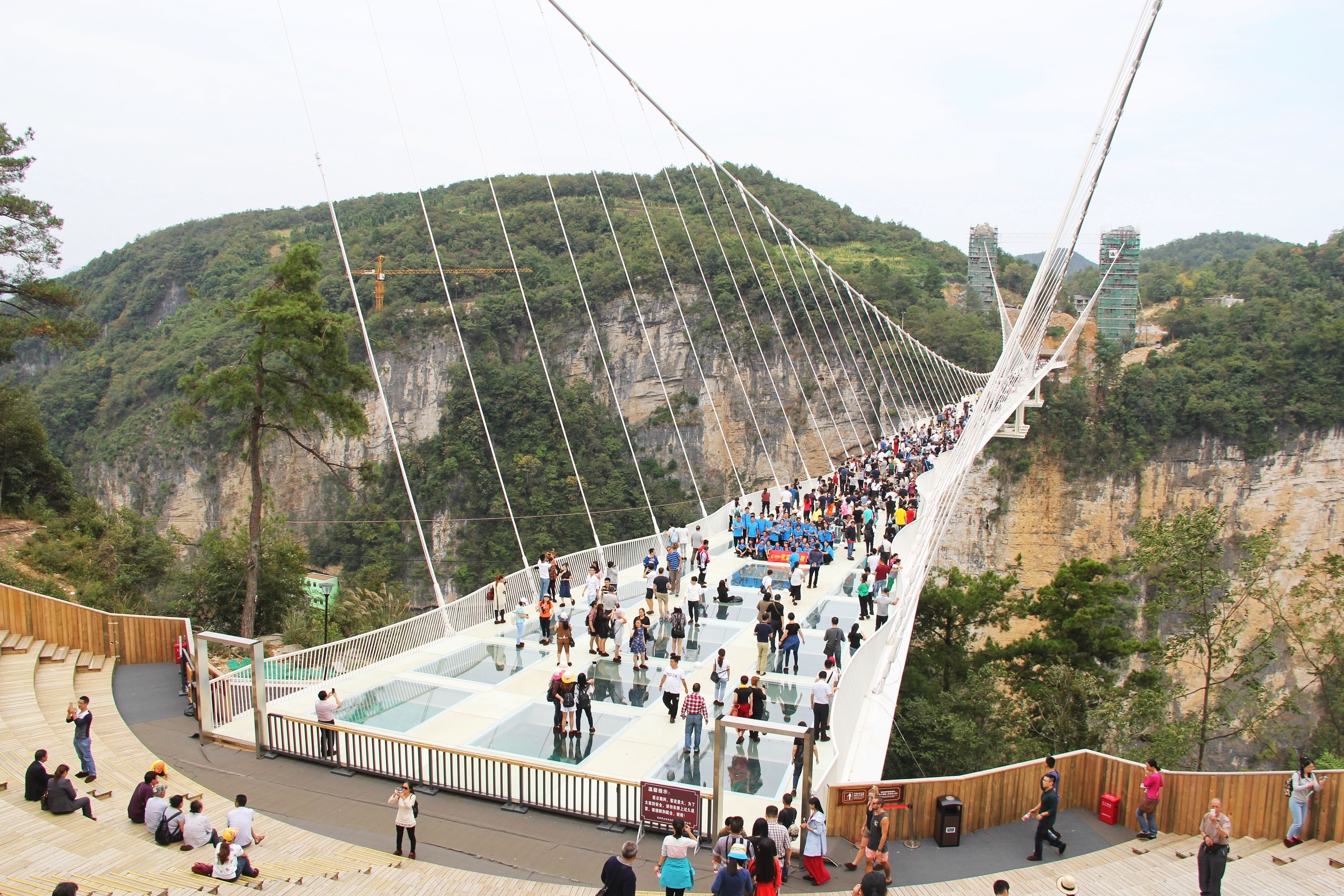
Groups of people crossing the Zhangjiajie Grand Canyon Glass Bridge in China. Picture taken from the west side of the gorge.

Sociology of architecture is the sociological study of the built environment and the role and occupation of architects in modern societies.

Architecture basically consists of the aesthetic, the engineering and the social aspects. The built environment which is made up of designed spaces and the activities of people are inter-related and inseparable. It is for us to understand this interrelationship and put it down appropriately on paper.

Social institutions are many and these social institutions sometimes need functional spaces to allow the people using the building to benefit from all aspects of both, the purpose of what inhabits the building and by the varied structure and organized flow of communication. The way the buildings are designed to fulfill the needs of these social institutions /social requirements can be said to be the compliance of social aspects in architecture.

== Cultural sociology ==
Architecture is the visual shape ("Gestalt") of society, and within that, all the various building types (architecture of consumption, of mobility, of the political and religious, as well as factories, prisons, cinema buildings, etc.) could become objects of architectural sociology. For example: how a specific architecture 'expresses' the structure and principles of a given society.

== Classical sociology of architecture ==
Such sociological analysis of architecture can be found in the classic authors of sociology in Marcel Mauss, Walter Benjamin, Norbert Elias, Michel Foucault, Ernst Bloch, Siegfried Kracauer, Pierre Bourdieu, Maurice Halbwachs, Karel Teige and others.

== Sociology of architectonic artifacts ==
The sociology of technology offers approaches to a sociology of (architectonic) artifacts. Initially, this sociology is interested in technical matters. While buildings (as art and technic) are not in the core of this discipline. The perspective of architecture as artifact would be the question of 'interactions' between architecture and subject: how a very specific architecture suggests certain ways, movements, perceptions.

== Urban sociology and sociology of space ==
The term "social space" is used by Pierre Bourdieu and others (in contrast to architecture or built environment) in a more abstract sense: as social constituted spatial structures. Georg Simmel founded such a sociology of space and always watched the architecture of society.

Simmel unfolded also an urban sociology (his articles were read in Chicago school): in his question of the specific ways of life in big cities ("Big cities and life of spirit", 1903). Urban sociology primarily deals with social structures within the city: their points are for instance processes of segregation, urbanization and the decline of cities. Recently, there is a research focus on "differences of cities", which will be more associated with a sociology of architecture. Ronald Daus is introducing new concepts in this area, studying the history of extra-European Megacities.

== See also ==
- Urban vitality
