= Daniel Sutherland Davidson =

American anthropologist

Daniel Sutherland Davidson (July 9, 1900—December 26, 1952) was an American anthropologist who also did important work among the Australian Aborigines in the 1930s.

== Life ==
Davidson was born in Cohoes in New York in 1900, the son of a travelling salesman, Matthew H. Davidson and his wife Laura (Sutherland). He studied at the University of Pennsylvania graduating in 1923, and taking successively a Master's (1924) and Doctoral degree in anthropology (1928). He was appointed instructor at his alma mater, remaining there, apart from a brief stint at the University of Buffalo for the academic year 1932-1932, until 1946. He spent a year at the University of Oregon before accepting a professorship at the University of Washington where he taught until his untimely death three years later.

Davidson's initial research focused, under the direction of his mentor Frank Speck, on the eastern Algonquian, where he developed an archaeological approach. Already with his doctoral dissertation however his deep interest in the indigenous population of Australia emerged as he applied the diffusionist model of the age and area theory to antipodean ethnographical materials. His doctoral thesis The Chronological Aspects of Certain Australian Social Institutions as inferred from Geographical Distribution was subject to a scathing critique (Note: 'If the aim of anthropological investigation is to enable us to arrive at the same sort of understanding of the phenomena of culture that other sciences give us of other phenomena, then such studies as this do not in any way serve their aim.') at the time by one of the major authorities on Australian ethnography, A. R. Radcliffe-Brown.

A grant from the American Philosophical Society enabled him to do fieldwork over nearly two years in northern Australia (1930-1931), followed up by a further stay in 1938–1939. Over this time, Davidson managed to gather a list of native vocabularies amounting to some 4200 words, collected from informants speaking 19 different languages of Western Australia. Much of this material has yet to receive close attention from researchers.

In 1938 he published A Preliminary Register of Australian Tribes and Hordes together with An Ethnic Map of Australia, a magisterial synthesis of his close sieving of the available ethnographic materials regarding Aboriginal groups. He followed this up with a monograph in 1941 on Australian tribal string figures, exhibiting a prestidigitator's mastery for replicating such designs which he had already demonstrated in a paper he had published in a 1927 paper on string figures among the Virginian Indians.

Davidson also retrieved unpublished manuscript material written by Edith Hassell on the myths of the Koreng tribe of Western Australia, and edited it for publication over 1934 and 1935.

== Sources ==
- "D. S. Davidson". International Directory of Anthropologists. National Academies/Werner-Gren Foundation. 1940.
- Davidson, Daniel Sutherland (August 6, 1941). "Aboriginal Australian String Figures". Proceedings of the American Philosophical Society. 84 (6): 763–901. JSTOR 984876.
- Hallowell, A. Irving; Gunther, Erna (October 1954). "Daniel Sutherland Davidson, 1900-1952". American Anthropologist. 56 (5): 873–876. doi:10.1525/aa.1954.56.5.02a00130. JSTOR 663821.
- Hassell, Edith (September 1934a). Davidson, D. S. (ed.). "Myths and Folktales of the Wheelman Tribe of South-Western Australia". Folklore. 45 (3): 232–248. doi:10.1080/0015587x.1934.9718560. JSTOR 1256168.
- Hassell, Edith (December 1934b). Davidson, D. S. (ed.). "Myths and Folktales of the Wheelman Tribe of South-Western Australia. 11". Folklore. 45 (4): 317–341. doi:10.1080/0015587x.1934.9718572. JSTOR 1257857.
- Hassell, Edith (June 1935a). Davidson, D. S. (ed.). "Myths and Folk-Tales of the Wheelman Tribe of South-Western Australia. III". Folklore. 46 (2): 122–147. doi:10.1080/0015587x.1935.9718592. JSTOR 1257649.
- Hassell, Edith (September 1935b). Davidson, D. S. (ed.). "Myths and Folk-Tales of the Wheelman Tribe of South-Western Australia: IV". Folklore. 46 (3): 268–281. doi:10.1080/0015587x.1935.9718605. JSTOR 1257385.
- McCarthy, F. D. (1981). Davidson, Daniel Sutherland (1900–1952). Australian Dictionary of Biography. Vol. 8. Melbourne University Press.
- Nash, David (May 3, 2006). Daniel Sutherland Davidson.
- Peterson, Nicolas (1976). "The natural and cultural areas of Aboriginal Australia: a preliminary analysis of population groupings with adaptive significance". In Peterson, Nicolas (ed.). Tribes and Boundaries in Australia. Australian Institute of Aboriginal Studies. pp. 50–71.
- Radcliffe-Brown, A. R. (October–December 1930). "The Diffusion of Culture in Australia". Oceania. 1 (3): 366–370. doi:10.1002/j.1834-4461.1930.tb01658.x. JSTOR 40327336.
