= Disability anthropology =

Subdiscipline of anthropology

Disability anthropology is a cross-section of anthropological studies that takes sociocultural approaches to interdisciplinary disability studies. The main subdisciplines of anthropology active in disability anthropology studies are medical anthropology and cultural anthropology.

The field of disability anthropology focuses on topics related to accessibility, activism, care, disability, embodiment, eugenics, and illness. Scholars develop and assess approaches to solving problems or helping to bring about change for disabled people and communities. The topic of disability within anthropology persuades researchers to use a cultural lens and ethnolographic approach to identify unfamiliarity and "otherness" among cultures.

== History ==
The contribution of anthropology to disability studies is still relatively new.

Important scholars who consider the relationship between anthropology and disability include Devva Kasnitz and Russell Shuttleworth, Faye Ginsburg and Rayna Rapp, Cassandra Hartblay, and Erin L. Durban.

There is a distinction between "anthropology of disability" and "disability anthropology" in that the latter is intimately connected to interdisciplinary critical disability studies and crip theory. Both these fields include extensive research done around the world.

== See also ==
- Applied anthropology
- Medical anthropology
- Cultural anthropology
