= Bioculture =

Area of interdisciplinary study

Bioculture is the combination of biological and cultural factors that affect human behavior. It is an area of study bounded by the medical sciences, social sciences, landscape ecology, cultural anthropology, biotechnology, disability studies, the humanities, and the economic and global environment. Along these lines, one can see the biosphere — the earth as it is affected by the human — as the adaptation of the natural to the human and biocultures as the inter-adaptation of the human to the new technologies and ways of knowing characterized by the 21st century’s attitude toward the body. It assumes that in bioculture there is a diverse way to know the workings of the body and mind, and that these are primarily culturally derived, and an expert's way of knowing produces specific strong results. However, the results do not have an exclusive purview over the body and mind. Plus, it seeks to develop and encourage not only the experts but also parts of people's bodies and minds as the subject of study.

== Alternative definitions ==
An alternative definition of the term bioculture is all the practical aspects of the use of living things in culture, including agriculture, production of food and clothing, forestry, animal breeding and training, the pet trade, use of living things in science, zoos and aquariums, animal sports, and the raising of game for sport hunting.

== Existence ==
The term bioculture does not exist as such in the English or Spanish dictionary. BioCultura is a trademark registered in 1983 by the Asociación Vida Sana. The Asociación Vida Sana, elaborated in 1981 the bases for the development of ecological agriculture in Spain through the booklets of norms of ecological agriculture, thus contributing to the health of consumers and, on the other, to the decontamination of the land, water and air, stopping the pollution of the techniques of industrialized agriculture, without counting on the no less obvious and considerable economic and social advantages that these alternatives offer. In 1983 he began to organize the BioCultura fair in Madrid with the support of the city council. The aim was to offer an opportunity to the first organic producers to make their products known to consumers. And they coined the term BioCultura from the prefix Bio joined to the word culture. The trademark was registered in the Patent and Trademark Office. The use and popularity of the brand has caused it to be used as a vocable to determine the sector of the "bio or eco culture", although it is a brand. After 40 years leading the universe of ecological, sustainable culture and responsible consumption in Spain, BioCultura creates BioCultura ON, now for the entire Spanish-speaking community of the world.

== Ethics in Bioculture ==
Moral ethical behavior deals with how humans behave with each other, likewise Bioculture ethics deals with how humans treat animals and plants. Ethics in Bioculture come into question especially in situations, where the animals and plants are in artificially created environments that are completely controlled by human. In such situations, humans control not only the environmental conditions that these non-human organisms will live under, but even how they will breed and the genetic composition that they would have to meet human purposes.

Plants and animals could be bred by humans to be later consumed or utilized by humans in some way. For example, agricultural farming for food and clothing; breeding, raising, and then slaughtering animals for food and clothing; growing forests to eventually cut them for wood; or breeding animals and plants and experimenting on them in laboratories. On the other hand, animal and plants could be bred for entertainment purposes also. For example, developing plant nurseries to harvest flowers; building and maintaining zoos, aquariums for entertainment; breeding animals for sports like horse riding or bull fighting; pet trade; or breeding birds or animals in sporting/hunting grounds and fishes in lakes for game fishing. In each of the above instances, two principles are common - (1) Humans decide how the life of the non-human organism will be led; and (2) non-human organism is bred with the end goal to benefit humans.

When we use tools and equipments in any setting to gain productive results, we are dealing with non-living things here. However in case of the above-mentioned Bioculture examples, the animals and plants are living, but the human being is deciding how their lives will be lived. Not all plants and animals raised in Bioculture are treated badly or are hurt. Some, as in case of pet trade, the pets are looked after. The pet owner is considered to be responsible for taking care of all things pertaining to the pet. The owner may say that he takes care of his pet, because of his love and affection towards it. But, what about other situations like sport hunting, laboratory experiments, and others. Paul Taylor asks in his book on the fairness of hurting these animals and plants for our benefit or fun, just because we don't have inherent love and affection towards them. Among humans, even when we don't have love and affection towards some stranger, moral ethics require us to behave well with them. The question then arises as to how this translate this ethical duty and responsibility to the field of Bioculture for plants and animals.
