= Linda M. Hunt =

American physician

Linda M. Hunt is a professor of anthropology specializing in Medical anthropology at Michigan State University. She teaches and researches on Medical Anthropology, Minority Health Research, and Research Methods in Cultural Anthropology. She has been researching issues related to diabetes management, the use race and genetics in clinical care, and pharmaceuticalization, among others.

== Biography ==
She graduated from Wayne State University and Harvard University.

== Research ==
Hunt has performed various research projects focusing on clinical medicine and minority health care in both the United States and Mexico. Her latest research has been on clinical understandings of genetic risk, management of chronic illness, racial/ethnic identities in clinical situations, and health care reform. Her research also investigates low-income individuals' access to health care and the impact of economic interests on clinical medicine.

== Most cited publications ==
- LM Hunt, S Schneider, B Comer -"Should “acculturation” be a variable in health research? A critical review of research on US Hispanics" Social science & medicine, 2004. Google Scholar
- LM Hunt, MA Valenzuela, JA Pugh - "NIDDM patients' fears and hopes about insulin therapy: the basis of patient reluctance" Diabetes Care, 1997.
- P Sankar, MK Cho, CM Condit, LM Hunt "Genetic research and health disparities", JAMA, 2004.

== See also ==
- Racial profiling
- Pharmacogenetics
