= Ronald Daus =

German language scholar (born 1943)

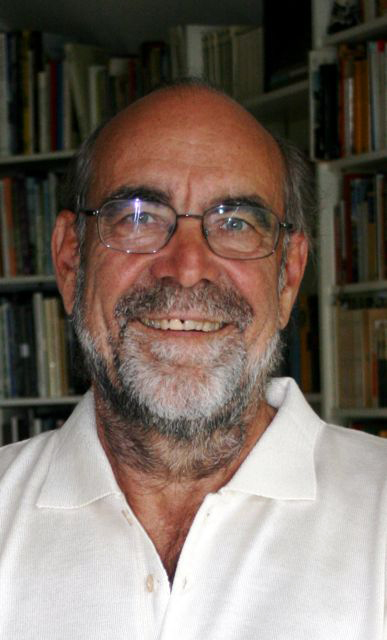
- (2010)

Personal details
- Born: 12 May 1943 Hannover
- Education: Free University of Berlin

Ronald Daus (12 May 1943, Hannover) is a German university Professor of Romance philology and cultural studies at the Free University of Berlin involved in multi-disciplinary studies.

Daus researches in the field of study "Neue Romania" (New Romania) for over 40 years, with the focus on the contacts between European and extra-European cultures. He was a visiting professor in Mexico City for two years, at Colegio de Mexico, and for one year in Singapore, at the Institute of Southeast Asian Studies, in Manila, at the University of the Philippines, and also in Tahiti, at the Université du Pacifique. Many research trips and lecture tours brought him to Europe, Russia, Latin America, Middle America, United States, Canada, Asia, Africa, Australia and Oceania.

He is a member of the Research Group New Romania, who investigate the «products resulting from the contacts of the Romanic cultures that expanded across the seas for colonialism, featuring, together with other nations, new linguistic varieties and cultures». The languages involving such contacts belong to these groups: Lusophonie, in Brazil and Africa, Hispanophonie, mainly in Latin America and United States, Francophonie, in twenty two African countries, Caribbean, Canada and Latin America.

Romanic peoples like the Portuguese are so considered as the inventors of colonialism. Focusing on «extra-European cities, predominantly in the Southern Hemisphere», introducing new study objects in the traditional science of Romania, innovating in cultural anthropology, ethnology and sociology in the areas of popular culture, urban human settlements and architecture, Daus is responsible for «new approaches to excel old theories», contributing for a better understanding of contemporary world».

== Biography ==
=== Scholarship ===
Ronald Daus studied Romance philology and languages (Portuguese, Spanish, French, Italian) in Hamburg, Lisbon, Rio de Janeiro and Kiel. At the same time, as related area, he studied orientalism (Arabic, Malay, Tagalog).

In 1967 he won a doctorate with a thesis entitled The epic cycle of the cangaceiros in popular poetry from northeastern Brazil (Der epische Zyklus der Cangaceiros in der Volkspoesie Nordostbrasiliens). In 1970 he habilitated on Ramón Gómez de la Serna. He got the call as university professor at the Free University of Berlin, aged 27. There he hold lectures and proceeded with his researches until he retired in 2008.

=== Research ===
The Age of Discovery, Portuguese colonial expansion, the Atlantic slave trade, Migration, Disease, and maritime commerce contributed to the transmission of Portuguese oral traditions and popular poetry to Brazil. Men and memories would spread through vast plains into the remotest corners of the conquered lands. Bandits like Lampião and other celebrated cangaceiros would embody such traditions. Daus’s first pioneering essay, The epic cycle of the cangaceiros in popular poetry from northeastern Brazil would follow their steps and explain how and why they would become national heroes and fund a new kind of epic literature. Northeastern Brazil would be the first place where he found testimonies of mischievous merriments of human history and an angry Latin America.

Further, Daus would demonstrate, on the other hand, how other Portuguese settlements, on the other side of the world, faraway in Malaysia, would contribute to the «development and maintenance of particular cultural and linguistic practices» at a time when he was seriously concerned with a trifling problem he dared to confront: the wrath against colonialism.

In European expansion, linguistic and cultural interact of humans living overseas, spread all around the world in small groups or vast populations, generated “Euroamerican” and “Euroasian” communities. Large extra-European cities gather large concentrations of European migrants, among others. That is why they deserve particular attention for anyone concerned with the role of romanic influence in the New World, mainly as far as it originated typical Megalopolis, Megacities or Global cities reflecting original models, distorting them in local versions. In some cases, out of norm, forced by the growth of their populations or promoting them, big new cities turn into atypique global cities: Tijuana, Cancún, Dubai. Some old global cities, proud of their influence, grow as “mono maniac reports” of themselves: Berlin, Paris, Mexico City, Schanghai. Expressing new feelings, the wish for pleasure in certain exotique global cities contrasts with the affected mise-en-scène of older and symbolic ones, and that has a meaning. Moreover, there are several European large cities in risk of third world contamination.

In the meantime, Daus conceives a trilogy having as generic title New city images – new feelings ("Neue Stadtbilder – Neue Gefühle”). In order to better understand European colonialism, he analyses in the first volume the origins of the mega-metropolis in America, Asia, Africa and Oceania, cities constructed stone on stone, evoking as typical Luanda, capital city of Angola, one of the most expensive cities in the world nowadays, which will project itself as historical synthesis in future. In the second one, he tries a new understanding of the biggest cities and develops the concept of "package-city", referring Berlin as a curious example. In the third volume, he follows the intellectual and artistic progression of the idea of mega-metropolis to East, until Euro-Asia: Berlin, Warsaw, Minsk, Moscow, Bishkek, Almaty and Astana, “stations” or land-marks of such progress. As inspiring instances of extreme settling in eastern big cities, he mentions Vienne, Istanbul, Teheran, Bombay, Chengdu, Peking, Johannesburg, Cape Town, Manaus, Caracas.

Daus has been busy, describing and studding such phenomena for over a decade, since he reported the existence of a “European fundament” in large extra-European cities (1995). He reveals dangerous signs of extreme colonialism in regions of the Red Sea by the end of the 20th century and talks of “beach culture versus city culture” in Mediterranean metropolis at the early 21st century. New city buildings expressing new feelings, he says, are expressions of permanent chaos.

== Bibliography ==
Partial list, among other scientific publications:

- The epic cycle of the cangaceiros in popular poetry from northeastern Brazil (Der epische Zyklus der Cangaceiros in der Volkspoesie Nordostbrasiliens, Colloquium Berlag, Berlin 1969; O ciclo épico dos cangaceiros na poesia popular do nordeste, Fundação Casa de Rui Barbosa, Rio de Janeiro 1982)
- Angry Latin America. Self-portrait of a continent (Zorniges Lateinamerika. Selbstdarstellung eines Kontinent, Diederichs Verlag, Berlin 1973)
- The discovery of colonialism. Portuguese in Asia (Die Erfindung des Kolonialismus. Die Portugiesen in Asie, Peter Hammer Verlag, Wuppertal, 1983)
- Manila – essay on the progress of a global city (Manila – Essay über die Karriere einer Weltstadt, Babylon Metropolis Studies, Ursula Opitz Verlag, Berlin 1987)
- Portuguese Eurasian communities in Southeast Asia (Publisher: Institute of Southeast Asian Studies)
- Large extra-European cities. The European fundament (Großstädte Außereuropas. Das europäische Fundament), Babylon Metropolis Studies, Ursula Opitz Verlag, Berlin, vol. 1, 1990)
- Large extra-European cities. The construction of nationalities (Großstädte Außereuropas. Die Konstruktion des Nationalen, Babylon Metropolis Studies, Ursula Opitz Verlag, Berlin, vol. 2, 1995)
- Large extra-European cities. Pursuit for living and human suffering (Großstädte Außereuropas. Lebenslust und Menschenleid, Babylon Metropolis Studies, Ursula Opitz Verlag, Berlin, vol. 3, 1997)
- Extreme colonialism. History of the Red Sea. Images from the Pacific (Kolonialismus extrem. Geschichten vom Roten Meer – Bilder vom Pazifik, Babylon Metropolis Studies, Ursula Opitz Verlag, Berlin, 1998)
- Beach culture versus city culture. The early 21st century metropolis from Mediterranean (Strandkultur statt Stadtkultur. Die Metropolen des Mittelmeers zu Beginn des 21. Jahrhunderts, Babylon Metropolis Studies, Ursula Opitz Verlag, Berlin, 2000)
- Banlieue – free spaces in European and extra-European cities (Banlieue – Freiräume in europäischen und außereuropäischen Großstädten. Europa: Paris, Berlin, Barcelona, Babylon Metropolis Studies, Ursula Opitz Verlag, Berlin, 2002)
- Banlieue – free spaces in European and extra-European cities. Large cities in Latin America: Rio de Janeiro, Africa: Douala, Asia: Bangkok (Banlieue – Freiräume in europäischen und außereuropäischen Großstädten. Lateinamerika: Rio de Janeiro, Afrika: Douala, Asien: Bangkok, Babylon Metropolis Studies, Ursula Opitz Verlag, Berlin, 2003)
- La Guajira. How a savage land will be noticed (La Guajira. Wie ein wildes Land erzählt wird, Babylon Metropolis Studies, Ursula Opitz Verlag, Berlin, 2006)
- Global cities. From norm to caprice (Weltstädte. Von der Norm zur Laune, Babylon Metropolis Studies, Ursula Opitz Verlag, Berlin, Weltstädte – Reihe, vol. 1, 2006, 2. 2009)
- Atypique Global cities. The wish for pleasure in the exotique: Tijuana, Cancún, Dubai (Atypische Weltstädte. Die Verlagerung des Vergnügens ins Exotische: Tijuana, Cancún, Dubai, Babylon Metropolis Studies, Ursula Opitz Verlag, Berlin – Weltstädte – Reihe, vol. 2, 2007, 2009)
- Mise-en-scène of Global cities. Mono maniac reports from Berlin, Paris, Mexico City and Schanghai (Weltstadtinszenierungen. Monomanische Berichte aus Berlin, Paris, Mexiko-Stadt und Schanghai, Babylon Metropolis Studies, Ursula Opitz Verlag, Berlin, – Weltstädte – Reihe, vol. 3, 2008)
- New city images, new feelings. European buildings as world models Neue Stadtbilder – Neue Gefühle. Europäische Stadtanlagen als Weltmodell, Metropolis Studies, Ursula Opitz Verlag, Berlin, Stadtbilder-Reihe, vol. 1, 2011
- New city images, new feelings. The package-city: Berlin (Neue Stadtbilder – Neue Gefühle. Die Package-City: Berlin, Babylon Metropolis Studies, Ursula Opitz Verlag, Berlin, Stadtbilder – Reihe, vol. 2, 2012)
- New city images, new feelings. The permanent chaos (Neue Stadtbilder – Neue Gefühle. Das permanente Chaos, Babylon Metropolis Studies, Ursula Opitz Verlag, Berlin, Stadtbilder -Reihe, vol. 3, 2013)

== See also ==
- Cities
- Cultural anthropology
- Favelas
- First European colonization wave
- Global cities
- Human settlements
- Landscape history
- Metropolis
- Megalopolis
- Megacities
- Portuguese Empire
- Portuguese discoveries
- Sociology of architecture
- Urban zones
- Urban areas
- Urban studies
- Urban culture
- Urban sociology
