= Age-area hypothesis =

Concept in cultural anthropology

The age-area hypothesis is a concept in cultural anthropology that cultural traits tend to expand outward from their origin with time. Thus, the larger an area that a trait is found in, the older it is.

The age-area hypothesis is controversial, and considered by some to be discredited.
