= William Abel Caudill =

American anthropologist

- Born: September 28, 1920
- Died: March 24, 1972 (aged 51)
- Education: University of Chicago (PhD)
- Occupation: Anthropologist

William Abel Caudill (September 28, 1920 – March 24, 1972) was an American applied medical anthropologist. His work centered on psychiatry, and the influence of culture on personality. Caudill was especially interested in diagnosis and treatment of mental issues in Japan. Caudill was the first to identify the field of medical anthropology, and was active in organizing it during its formative years.

== Education and appointments ==
Caudill pursued his graduate studies in sociocultural anthropology at the University of Chicago. He received his Ph.D. in 1950 for a dissertation entitled Japanese-American Acculturation and Personality. After completing his graduate work, Caudill accepted an instructorship position at Yale University, and remained there from 1950 to 1952. Caudill then went on to accept a faculty position with the Department of Social Relations at Harvard University from 1952 to 1960. While at Harvard, Caudill also took an appointment as Research Associate with the Department of Psychology, within Harvard Medical School. After leaving Harvard in 1960, Caudill became Chief of the Personality and Environment Section of the Laboratory of Socioenvironmental Studies at the United States National Institute of Mental Health (NIMH). Caudill remained at NIMH, where he was also a member of the Association Nominations Committee, until his death in 1972, in Washington D.C.

== Early academic career ==
During the early stages of his career, Caudill's research interests focused on culture and personality and psychological studies. Later on, when Caudill became more involved with medical anthropology, his interests shifted towards mental illness, and the experiences of patients in psychiatric hospitals. Caudill's earliest research, funded by the University of Chicago, was conducted in July and August 1946 and consisted of psychological study of the Chippewa Indians of Lac du Flambeau. Caudill investigated whether personality change could be visible under conditions of acculturation. Caudill participated in this study as a member of a field party led by Dr. Irving Hallowell.

From 1947 to 1949, Caudill conducted research on Japanese Americans in Chicago, who had recently been released from internment during World War II. Caudill, and the team he worked with, were interested in the social and psychological adjustment process that these Japanese Americans underwent after release from internment camps.

== Contributions to medical anthropology ==
After receiving his PhD from Chicago, Caudill's interests turned from psychological anthropology to medical anthropology. Caudill was able to conduct his first major fieldwork in medical anthropology after he was invited by Yale Medical School to study the social hierarchies within the Yale Psychiatric Institute. As a condition of the fieldwork, Caudill undertook participant observation by living as a "patient" in the Psychiatric Ward for two months, with his identity as a researcher known only to the superintendent of the hospital. Caudill reported his conclusions from this fieldwork in "Social Structure and Interaction Processes on a Psychiatric Ward," published in the American Journal of Orthopsychiatry in 1952. He identified a need for future anthropological study of hospitals.

After this study, Caudill published an article in Science that drew attention to the emerging field of medical anthropology. In "Anthropology in Medicine," Caudill brought light to recent interdisciplinary scholarship, which he identified as critical in the study of medical anthropology. He wrote:

Social anthropologists and other social scientists have been doing unusual things of late: participating with physicians in conferences in social medicine, teaching in medical schools, working with public health services in Peru, studying the social structure of hospitals, interviewing patients about to undergo plastic surgery, and doing psychotherapy with Plains Indians. These activities are indicative of a tentative liaison between social science and medicine; but as yet there has been little real intercommunication.

Caudill noted that increased communication between specialists in medicine and the social sciences would help develop this field: a field which he cited as integral to the understanding and management of society's ills.

In the same year, Caudill undertook a more intensive study of the Yale Psychiatric Institute. This time, he approached the study from the position of anthropologist instead of patient. For this follow-up study, Caudill conducted intensive interviews with hospital staff, recorded daily staff meetings, studied doctors' and nurses' notes, and interacted with patients. Caudill identified several challenges inherent in the structure of the Psychiatric Institute, and offered strategies to remedy these problems. Among the challenges identified were differential feelings among different levels of staff and patients about hospital life, breakdowns in communication between staff members, and periodic hospital-wide "mood sweeps". Caudill argued that increased awareness of hospital structure could help make job delegation a smoother process. Caudill also contended that the increasing specialization of medical positions was a cause of communication problems among members of a patient's care team. To address this problem, Caudill recommended that the positions of psychotherapist and ward administrator be combined. Caudill's 1952 to 1953 study at the Yale Psychiatric Institute was published in 1958, in his book, "The Psychiatric Hospital as a Small Society". A resulting journal article and book from this research are considered to be some of the earliest contributions to the field of medical anthropology.

Beginning in 1954, Caudill turned his interests to Japan, and made a series of trips in order to carry out research. For "Some Covert Effects of Communication Difficulties in a Psychiatric Hospital," published in 1954, Caudill spent six months conducting fieldwork at fifteen different Japanese hospitals. Here, Caudill's work focused again on social hierarchies within hospitals and their effects on patients. During this period, Caudill also took interest in and observed the relationship between American soldiers and the Japanese communities within which they were situated within.

In 1958–59, Caudill's studies focused on three psychiatric hospitals with varied theoretical orientations and methods of treatment. He also carried out studies of Japanese psychoanalysis and Morita therapy. In 1961, Caudill published "Around the Clock Patient Care in Japanese Psychiatric Hospitals: The Role of the Tsukisoi." In this article, Caudill explores the role of tsukisoi, sub-professional nurses who are assigned on a one-on-one basis to patients in private Japanese psychiatric hospitals, in hospital power structures and patient well-being. A year later, Caudill published "Japanese Value Orientations and Culture Change." Both research projects had been funded by the Foundation's Fund in Research in Psychiatry while Caudill was still a faculty member at Harvard University.

In 1964, Caudill continued his study of psychiatric hospitals but with a comparative research approach. In "Symptomatology in Japanese and American Schizophrenics," Caudill compared symptom patterns of hospitalized schizophrenics in both Japanese and American psychiatric hospitals based on research at Matsuzawa Hospital in Tokyo and Spring Grove State Hospital in Cantonsville, Maryland.

Caudill also performed elegant comparative studies of mother-infant care in Japanese, Japanese-American (first and second generation) and American pairs. He demonstrated, for instance, that Japanese mothers would put down their infants to sleep after the infant was asleep; in contrast, American middle class mothers would put their awake infants in their cribs to sleep. This is consistent with amae and co-sleeping in Japanese culture. (Caudill and Weinstein) 1969

After Caudill's death in 1972, several of his articles were published posthumously. These include "The Influence of Social Structure and Culture on Human Behavior in Modern Japan," which was extracted from Caudill's presentation at a symposium on "Culture, Change, and Psychological Adjustment" at the Eighth International Congress of Anthropological and Ethnological Science in Tokyo, in September 1968.

== Selected bibliography ==
1949 "Psychological Characteristics of Acculturated WIsconsin Ojibwa Children," American Anthropologist, 51:3, 409–427

1951 "Pitfalls in the Organization of Interdisciplinary Research," Human Organization, 10:4, 12–15

1952 "Social Structure and Interaction Processes on a Psychiatric Ward," American Journal of Orthopsychiatry, 22, 314–334

1952b "Anthropology in Medicine," Science, 115, 3a

1953 "Cultural Perspectives on Stress," in Walter Reed Army Medical Center Symposium on Stress, Washington, D.C., 194–208.

1954 "Some Covert Effects of Communication Difficulties in a Psychiatric Hospital," Psychiatry, 17:1, 27–49.

1956 "Achievement, Culture and Personality: The Case of the Japanese Americans," American Anthropologist, 58:6, 1102–1126

1956b "Perspectives on Administration in Psychiatric Hospitals," Administrative Science Quarterly, 1:2, 155–170

1958 "Effects of Social and Cultural Systems in Reactions to Stress," Social Science Research Pamphlet, 14.

1959 "Observations on the Cultural Context of Japanese Psychiatry," in Culture and Mental Health: Cross-Cultural Studies, Opler, Marvin Kaufmann, ed. New York, 213–242.

1961 "Around the Clock Patient Care in Japanese Psychiatric Hospitals: The Role of the Tsukisoi," American Sociological Review, 26:2, 204–214

1962 "Japanese Value Orientations and Culture Change," Ethnology, 1:1, 53–91

1962b "Patterns of Emotion in Modern Japan," in Japanese culture: Its Development and Characteristics, Smith, Robert J., and Richard K. Beardsley, eds. New York: Viking Fund Publications in Anthropology. 115–131

1964 "Symptomatology in Japanese and American Schizophrenics," Ethnology, 3:2, 172–178

1973 "The Influence of Social Structure and Culture on Human Behavior in Modern Japan," Ethos, 1, 343–382

1973b "Psychiatry and Anthropology: the Individual and his Nexus," Anthropological Studies, 9, 67–77

1977 "The Cultural and Interpersonal Context of Everyday Health and Illness in Japan and American," in Asian Medical Systems, Berkeley: University of California Press. 159–177
