= Linda Hunt (reporter) =

American author, journalist

Linda Hunt is an author and journalist in the United States. She is a former CNN reporter and wrote the book Secret Agenda: The United States Government, Nazi Scientists, and Project Paperclip, 1945–1990 that first revealed Operation Paperclip and the extent to which the Federal government of the United States and United States Armed Forces aided this mission to bring German scientists, engineers, and technicians to the United States after World War II. Hunt broke the story in 1985. She is from St. Petersburg, Florida.

Hunt won the Investigative Reporters and Editors Award in 1985. Hunt uncovered her information through what were then recently declassified government documents obtained under the Freedom of Information Act.
