= Cultural anthropology =

Branch of anthropology focused on the study of cultural variation among humans

Cultural anthropology is a branch of anthropology focused on the study of cultural variation among humans. It is in contrast to social anthropology, which perceives cultural variation as a subset of a posited anthropological constant. The term sociocultural anthropology includes both cultural and social anthropology traditions.

Anthropologists have pointed out that through culture, people can adapt to their environment in non-genetic ways, so people living in different environments will often have different cultures. Much of anthropological theory has originated in an appreciation of and interest in the tension between the local (particular cultures) and the global (a universal human nature, or the web of connections between people in distinct places/circumstances).

Cultural anthropology has a rich methodology, including participant observation (often called fieldwork because it requires the anthropologist to spend an extended period at the research site), interviews, and surveys.

== History ==
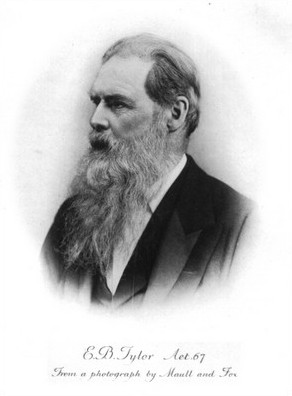
Edward Burnett Tylor, founder of cultural anthropology

Modern anthropology emerged in the 19th century, coinciding with significant developments in the Western world. These changes sparked a renewed interest in understanding humankind, particularly its origins, unity, and plurality. However, it was in the early 20th century that cultural anthropology began to adopt a more pluralistic perspective on cultures and societies. The term itself was coined by the Boas circle, who advanced the key theoretical frameworks of cultural relativism and historical particularism.

Cultural anthropology emerged in the late 19th century, shaped by debates over what constituted "primitive" versus "civilized" societies, an issue that preoccupied not only Freud, but many of his contemporaries. Colonialism expansion increasingly brought European thinkers into direct or indirect contact with "primitive others". The first generation of cultural anthropologists were interested in the relative status of various humans, some of whom had modern advanced technologies, while others lacked anything but face-to-face communication techniques and still lived a Paleolithic lifestyle.

== Theoretical foundations ==
=== The concept of culture ===
One of the earliest articulations of the anthropological meaning of the term "culture" came from Sir Edward Tylor: "Culture, or civilization, taken in its broad, ethnographic sense, is that complex whole which includes knowledge, belief, art, morals, law, custom, and any other capabilities and habits acquired by man as a member of society." The term "civilization" later gave way to definitions given by V. Gordon Childe, with culture forming an umbrella term and civilization becoming a particular kind of culture.

Kay Milton, former Director of Anthropology Research at Queen's University Belfast, distinguishes between general and specific cultures. This means culture can apply to all human beings, or be specific to a particular group, such as African American or Irish American culture. Specific cultures are structured systems, meaning they are highly organized, and adding or removing any element from that system may disrupt it.

=== The critique of evolutionism ===
Anthropology is concerned with the lives of people in different parts of the world, particularly in relation to the discourse of beliefs and practices. In addressing this question, ethnologists in the 19th century divided into two schools of thought. Some, like Grafton Elliot Smith, argued that different groups must have learned from one another somehow, however indirectly; in other words, they argued that cultural traits spread from one place to another, or "diffused".

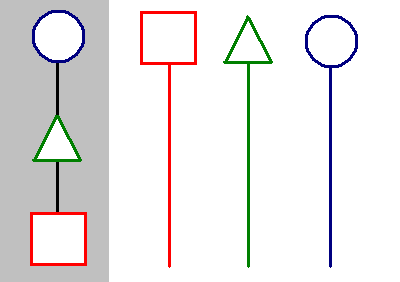
In the unilineal evolution model at left, all cultures progress through set stages, while in the multilineal evolution model at right, distinctive culture histories are emphasized.

Other ethnologists argued that different groups could independently create similar beliefs and practices. Some of those who advocated "independent invention", like Lewis Henry Morgan, additionally supposed that similarities meant that different groups had passed through the same stages of cultural evolution (See also classical social evolutionism). Morgan, in particular, acknowledged that certain forms of society and culture could not possibly have arisen before others. For example, industrial farming could not have been invented before simple farming, and metallurgy could not have developed without previous non-smelting processes involving metals (such as simple ground collection or mining). Morgan, like other 19th-century social evolutionists, believed there was a more or less orderly progression from the primitive to the civilized.

20th-century anthropologists largely reject the notion that all human societies must pass through the same stages in the same order, because it does not fit empirical evidence. Some 20th-century ethnologists, like Julian Steward, have instead argued that such similarities reflected similar adaptations to similar environments. Although 19th-century ethnologists saw "diffusion" and "independent invention" as mutually exclusive and competing theories, most ethnographers quickly reached a consensus that both processes occur and can plausibly account for cross-cultural similarities. But these ethnographers also pointed out the superficiality of many such similarities. They noted that even traits that spread through diffusion often were given different meanings and functions from one society to another. Analyses of large human concentrations in big cities, in multidisciplinary studies by Ronald Daus, show how new methods may be applied to understanding man living in a global world and how this was caused by the actions of extra-European nations, thereby highlighting the role of Ethics in modern anthropology.

Accordingly, most of these anthropologists showed less interest in comparing cultures, generalizing about human nature, or discovering universal laws of cultural development than in understanding particular cultures in those cultures' own terms. Such ethnographers and their students promoted the idea of "cultural relativism", the view that one can only understand another person's beliefs and behaviors in the context of the culture in which they live or lived.

Others, such as Claude Lévi-Strauss (who was influenced by both American cultural anthropology and French Durkheimian sociology), have argued that apparently similar patterns of development reflect fundamental similarities in the structure of human thought (see structuralism). By the mid-20th century, the number of examples of people skipping stages, such as going from hunter-gatherers to post-industrial service occupations in one generation, was so numerous that 19th-century evolutionism was effectively disproved.

=== Cultural relativism ===
Cultural relativism is a principle that was established as axiomatic in anthropological research by Franz Boas and later popularized by his students. Boas first articulated the idea in 1887: "...civilization is not something absolute, but ... is relative, and ... our ideas and conceptions are true only so far as our civilization goes." Although Boas did not coin the term, it became common among anthropologists after Boas died in 1942, to express their synthesis of several ideas Boas had developed. Boas argued that cultural development is not determined by genetic ancestry. Cultural relativism involves specific epistemological and methodological claims. Whether or not these claims require a specific ethical stance is a matter of debate. This principle should not be confused with moral relativism.

Cultural relativism was in part a response to Western ethnocentrism. Ethnocentrism may take obvious forms, in which one consciously believes that one's people's arts are the most beautiful, values the most virtuous, and beliefs the most truthful. Boas, originally trained in physics and geography, and heavily influenced by the thought of Kant, Herder, and von Humboldt, argued that one's culture may mediate and thus limit one's perceptions in less obvious ways. This understanding of culture confronts anthropologists with two problems: first, how to escape the unconscious bonds of one's own culture, which inevitably bias our perceptions of and reactions to the world, and second, how to make sense of an unfamiliar culture. The principle of cultural relativism thus forced anthropologists to develop innovative methods and heuristic strategies.

Boas and his students realized that if they were to conduct scientific research in other cultures, they would need to employ methods that avoid the limits of researcher ethnocentrism. One such method is that of ethnography. This method advocates living with people of another culture for an extended period to learn the local language and be at least partially enculturated into that culture. In this context, cultural relativism is of fundamental methodological importance because it highlights the significance of the local context in understanding the meaning of particular human beliefs and activities. Thus, in 1948, Virginia Heyer wrote, "Cultural relativity, to phrase it in starkest abstraction, states the relativity of the part to the whole. The part gains its cultural significance by its place in the whole, and cannot retain its integrity in a different situation."

=== Theoretical approaches ===
- Actor–network theory
- Cultural materialism
- Culture theory
- Feminist anthropology
- Functionalism
- Historical materialism
- Symbolic and interpretive anthropology
- Political economy in anthropology
- Practice theory
- Structuralism
- Post-structuralism
- Systems theory in anthropology

=== Comparison with social anthropology ===
The rubric cultural anthropology is generally applied to ethnographic works that are holistic in approach, oriented toward how culture affects individual experience, or that aim to provide a rounded view of the knowledge, customs, and institutions of a people. Social anthropology is a term applied to ethnographic works that attempt to isolate a particular system of social relations, such as those that comprise domestic life, economy, law, politics, or religion, give analytical priority to the organizational bases of social life, and attend to cultural phenomena as somewhat secondary to the main issues of social scientific inquiry.

Parallel with the rise of cultural anthropology in the United States, social anthropology developed as an academic discipline in Britain and in France.

== Foundational thinkers ==
=== Lewis Henry Morgan ===
Lewis Henry Morgan (1818–1881), a lawyer from Rochester, New York, became an advocate for and ethnological scholar of the Iroquois. His comparative analyses of religion, government, material culture, and especially kinship patterns proved to be influential contributions to the field of anthropology. Like other scholars of his day (such as Edward Tylor), Morgan argued that human societies could be classified according to cultural evolution on a scale of progression ranging from savagery to barbarism to civilization. Generally, Morgan used technology (such as bowmaking or pottery) as an indicator of position on this scale.

=== Franz Boas, founder of the modern discipline ===
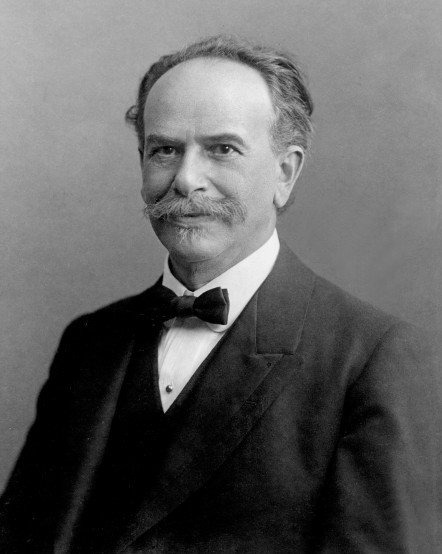
Franz Boas (1858–1942), one of the pioneers of modern anthropology, often called the "Father of American Anthropology"

Franz Boas (1858–1942) established academic anthropology in the United States in opposition to Morgan's evolutionary perspective. His approach was empirical, skeptical of overgeneralizations, and eschewed attempts to establish universal laws. For example, Boas studied immigrant children to demonstrate that genetic ancestry was not immutable and that human conduct and behavior resulted from nurture, rather than nature.

Influenced by the German tradition, Boas argued that the world was full of distinct cultures, rather than societies whose evolution could be measured by the extent of "civilization" they had. He believed that each culture has to be studied in its particularity, and argued that cross-cultural generalizations, like those made in the natural sciences, were not possible.

In doing so, he fought discrimination against immigrants, blacks, and indigenous peoples of the Americas. Many American anthropologists adopted his agenda for social reform, and theories of race continue to be popular subjects for anthropologists today. The so-called "Four Field Approach" has its origins in Boasian Anthropology, dividing the discipline into the four crucial and interrelated fields of sociocultural, biological, linguistic, and archeological anthropology (e.g., archaeology). Anthropology in the United States continues to be deeply influenced by the Boasian tradition, especially its emphasis on culture.

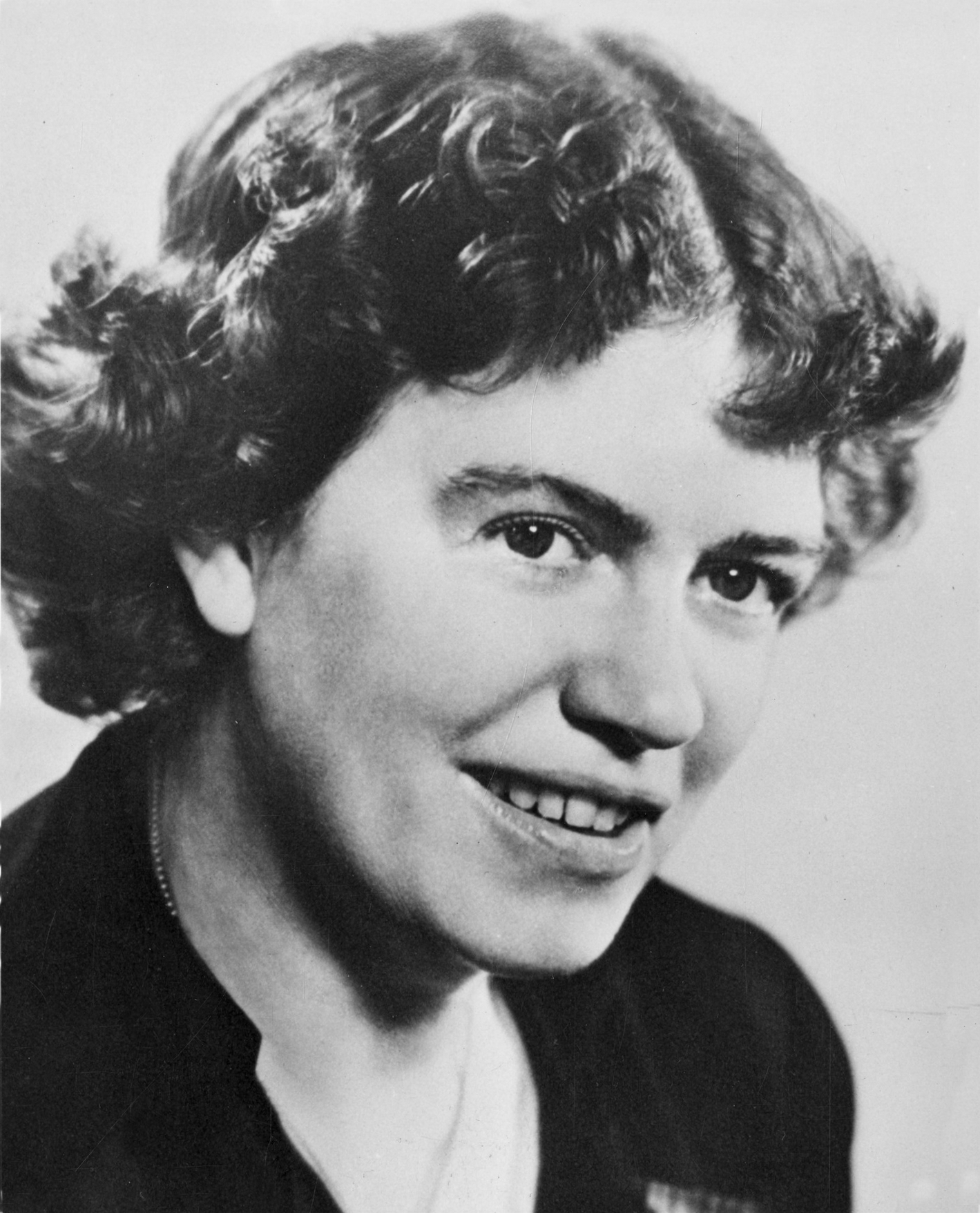
Margaret Mead (1901–1978)

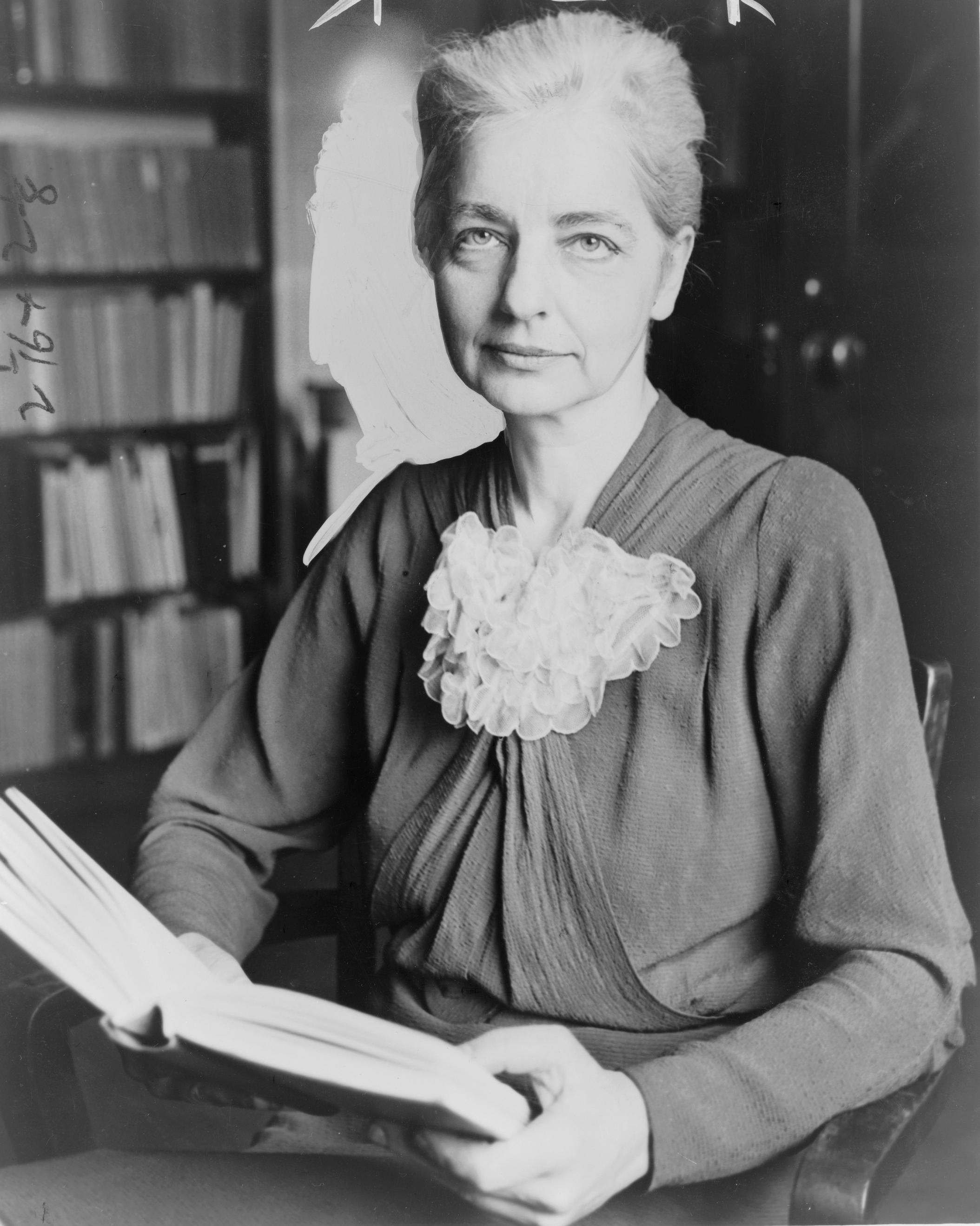
Ruth Benedict in 1937

=== Kroeber, Mead, and Benedict ===
Boas used his positions at Columbia University and the American Museum of Natural History (AMNH) to train and develop multiple generations of students. His first generation of students included Alfred Kroeber, Robert Lowie, Edward Sapir, and Ruth Benedict, who each produced richly detailed studies of indigenous North American cultures. They provided a wealth of details used to attack the theory of a single evolutionary process. Kroeber and Sapir's focus on Native American languages helped establish linguistics as a truly general science and free it from its historical focus on Indo-European languages.

The publication of Alfred Kroeber's textbook Anthropology (1923) marked a turning point in American anthropology. After three decades of amassing material, Boasians felt a growing urge to generalize. This was most obvious in the 'Culture and Personality' studies carried out by younger Boasians such as Margaret Mead and Ruth Benedict. Influenced by psychoanalytic psychologists, including Sigmund Freud and Carl Jung, these authors sought to understand how individual personalities were shaped by the broader cultural and social forces in which they grew up.

Though such works as Mead's Coming of Age in Samoa (1928) and Benedict's The Chrysanthemum and the Sword (1946) remain popular with the American public, Mead and Benedict never had the impact on the discipline of anthropology that some expected. Boas had planned for Ruth Benedict to succeed him as chair of Columbia's anthropology department, but she was sidelined in favor of Ralph Linton, and Mead was limited to her offices at the AMNH.

=== Wolf, Sahlins, Mintz, and political economy ===
In the 1950s and mid-1960s, anthropology increasingly modeled itself on the natural sciences. Some anthropologists, such as Lloyd Fallers and Clifford Geertz, focused on processes of modernization by which newly independent states could develop. Others, such as Julian Steward and Leslie White, focused on how societies evolve and fit their ecological niche—an approach popularized by Marvin Harris.

Economic anthropology as influenced by Karl Polanyi and practiced by Marshall Sahlins and George Dalton challenged standard neoclassical economics to take account of cultural and social factors and employed Marxian analysis in anthropological study. In England, British Social Anthropology's paradigm began to fragment as Max Gluckman and Peter Worsley experimented with Marxism, and authors such as Rodney Needham and Edmund Leach incorporated Lévi-Strauss's structuralism into their work. Structuralism also influenced several developments in the 1960s and 1970s, including cognitive anthropology and componential analysis.

In keeping with the times, much of anthropology became politicized through the Algerian War of Independence and opposition to the Vietnam War; Marxism became an increasingly popular theoretical approach in the discipline. By the 1970s the authors of volumes such as Reinventing Anthropology worried about anthropology's relevance.

Since the 1980s, issues of power, such as those examined in Eric Wolf's Europe and the People Without History, have been central to the discipline. In the 1980s, books like Anthropology and the Colonial Encounter pondered anthropology's ties to colonial inequality, while the immense popularity of theorists such as Antonio Gramsci and Michel Foucault moved issues of power and hegemony into the spotlight. Gender and sexuality became popular topics, as did the relationship between history and anthropology, influenced by Marshall Sahlins, who drew on Lévi-Strauss and Fernand Braudel to examine the relationship between symbolic meaning, sociocultural structure, and individual agency in the processes of historical transformation. Jean and John Comaroff produced a whole generation of anthropologists at the University of Chicago that focused on these themes. Also influential in these issues were Nietzsche, Heidegger, the critical theory of the Frankfurt School, Derrida and Lacan.

=== Geertz, Schneider, and interpretive anthropology ===
Many anthropologists reacted against the renewed emphasis on materialism and scientific modelling derived from Marx, emphasizing the importance of culture. Authors such as David Schneider, Clifford Geertz, and Marshall Sahlins developed a more fleshed-out concept of culture as a web of meaning or signification, which proved very popular within and beyond the discipline. Geertz was to state:

Believing, with Max Weber, that man is an animal suspended in webs of significance he himself has spun, I take culture to be those webs, and the analysis of it to be therefore not an experimental science in search of law but an interpretive one in search of meaning.

— Clifford Geertz (1973)

Geertz's interpretive method involved what he called "thick description". The cultural symbols of rituals, political and economic action, and of kinship, are "read" by the anthropologist as if they were a document in a foreign language. The interpretation of those symbols must be reframed for their anthropological audience, i.e., transformed from the "experience-near" but foreign concepts of the other culture, into the "experience-distant" theoretical concepts of the anthropologist. These interpretations must then be reflected to their originators, and their adequacy as a translation fine-tuned repeatedly, a process called the hermeneutic circle. Geertz applied his method in several areas, creating highly productive programs of study. His analysis of "religion as a cultural system" was particularly influential outside of anthropology. David Schnieder's cultural analysis of American kinship has proven equally influential. Schneider demonstrated that the American folk-cultural emphasis on "blood connections" had an undue influence on anthropological kinship theories, and that kinship is not a biological characteristic, but a cultural relationship established on very different terms in different societies.

Prominent British symbolic anthropologists include Victor Turner and Mary Douglas.

=== The post-modern turn ===
In the late 1980s and 1990s, authors such as James Clifford pondered ethnographic authority, in particular how and why anthropological knowledge was possible and authoritative. They were reflecting trends in research and discourse initiated by feminists in the academy, although they excused themselves from commenting specifically on those pioneering critics. Nevertheless, key aspects of feminist theory and methods became de rigueur as part of the 'post-modern moment' in anthropology: Ethnographies became more interpretative and reflexive, explicitly addressing the author's methodology; cultural, gendered, and racial positioning; and their influence on the ethnographic analysis. This was part of a broader trend of postmodernism that was popular at the time. Currently, anthropologists pay attention to a wide variety of issues of the contemporary world, including globalization, medicine and biotechnology, indigenous rights, virtual communities, and the anthropology of industrialized societies.

=== Sociocultural anthropology subfields ===
- Anthropology of art
- Cognitive anthropology
- Anthropology of development
- Disability anthropology
- Ecological anthropology
- Economic anthropology
- Ethnomusicology
- Feminist anthropology and anthropology of gender and sexuality
- Ethnohistory and historical anthropology
- Kinship and family
- Legal anthropology
- Multimodal anthropology
- Media anthropology
- Medical anthropology
- Political anthropology
- Political economy in anthropology
- Psychological anthropology
- Public anthropology
- Anthropology of religion
- Cyborg anthropology
- Transpersonal anthropology
- Urban anthropology
- Visual anthropology

== Methods ==
Modern cultural anthropology has its origins in, and developed in reaction to, 19th-century ethnology, which involves the organized comparison of human societies. Scholars like E.B. Tylor and J.G. Frazer in England worked mostly with materials collected by others—usually missionaries, traders, explorers, or colonial officials—earning them the moniker of "arm-chair anthropologists".

=== Participant observation ===
Participant observation is one of the principal research methods of cultural anthropology. It relies on the assumption that the best way to understand a group of people is to interact with them closely over a long period of time. The method originated in the field research of social anthropologists, especially Bronislaw Malinowski in Britain, the students of Franz Boas in the United States, and in the later urban research of the Chicago School of Sociology. Historically, the group of people being studied was a small, non-Western society. However, today it may be a specific corporation, a church group, a sports team, or a small town. There are no restrictions as to what the subject of participant observation can be, as long as the group of people is studied intimately by the observing anthropologist over a long period of time. This allows the anthropologist to develop trusting relationships with the subjects of study and gain an insider's perspective on the culture, which helps them provide a richer description when writing about it later. Observable details (like daily time allotment) and more hidden details (like taboo behavior) are more easily observed and interpreted over a longer period of time; researchers can discover discrepancies between what participants say—and often believe—should happen (the formal system) and what actually does happen, or between different aspects of the formal system; in contrast, a one-time survey of people's answers to a set of questions might be quite consistent, but is less likely to show conflicts between different aspects of the social system or between conscious representations and behavior.

Interactions between an ethnographer and a cultural informant must go both ways. Just as an ethnographer may be naive or curious about a culture, the members of that culture may be curious about the ethnographer. To establish connections that will eventually lead to a better understanding of the cultural context of a situation, an anthropologist must be open to becoming part of the group, and willing to develop meaningful relationships with its members. One way to do this is to find a small area of common experience between an anthropologist and their subjects, and then to expand from this common ground into the larger area of difference. Once a single connection has been established, it becomes easier to integrate into the community. It is more likely that accurate and complete information is being shared with the anthropologist.

Before participant observation can begin, an anthropologist must choose both a location and a focus of study. This focus may change once the anthropologist is actively observing the chosen group of people, but having an idea of what one wants to study before beginning fieldwork allows an anthropologist to spend time researching background information on their topic. It can also be helpful to know what previous research has been conducted in one's chosen location or on similar topics. If the participant observation takes place in a location where the spoken language is not one the anthropologist is familiar with, they will usually also learn that language. This allows the anthropologist to become better established in the community. The lack of need for a translator makes communication more direct and allows the anthropologist to give a richer, more contextualized representation of what they witness. In addition, participant observation often requires permits from governments and research institutions in the area of study, and always needs some form of funding.

The majority of participant observation is based on conversation. This can take the form of casual, friendly dialogue or a series of more structured interviews. A combination of the two is often used, sometimes along with photography, mapping, artifact collection, and various other methods. In some cases, ethnographers also turn to structured observation, in which an anthropologist's observations are directed by a specific set of questions they are trying to answer. In the case of structured observation, an observer might be required to record the order of a series of events, or describe a certain part of the surrounding environment. While the anthropologist still makes an effort to become integrated into the group they are studying, and still participates in the events as they observe, structured observation is more directed and specific than participant observation in general. This helps standardize the method of study when ethnographic data is compared across several groups or when it is needed to fulfill a specific purpose, such as research for a governmental policy decision.

One common criticism of participant observation is its lack of objectivity. Because each anthropologist has their own background and set of experiences, each individual is likely to interpret the same culture differently. Who the ethnographer is has a lot to do with what they will eventually write about a culture, because each researcher is influenced by their own perspective. This is considered a problem especially when anthropologists write in the ethnographic present, a present tense which makes a culture seem stuck in time, and ignores the fact that it may have interacted with other cultures or gradually evolved since the anthropologist made observations. To avoid this, past ethnographers have advocated for strict training or for anthropologists working in teams. However, these approaches have not generally been successful, and modern ethnographers often choose to include their personal experiences and possible biases in their writing instead.

Participant observation has also raised ethical questions, since an anthropologist controls what they report about a culture. In terms of representation, an anthropologist has greater power than their subjects of study, and this has drawn criticism of participant observation in general. Additionally, anthropologists have struggled with the effect their presence has on a culture. Simply by being present, a researcher causes changes in a culture, and anthropologists continue to question whether it is appropriate to influence the cultures they study or whether it is possible to avoid exerting influence.

=== Ethnography ===
In the 20th century, most cultural and social anthropologists turned to the crafting of ethnographies. An ethnography is a piece of writing about a people, at a particular place and time. Typically, the anthropologist lives among people in another society for a period of time, simultaneously participating in and observing the group's social and cultural life.

Numerous other ethnographic techniques have resulted in ethnographic writing or in the preservation of details, as cultural anthropologists also curate materials, spend long hours in libraries, churches, and schools poring over records, investigate graveyards, and decipher ancient scripts. A typical ethnography will also include information about physical geography, climate, and habitat. It is meant to be a holistic piece of writing about the people in question, and today often includes the longest possible timeline of past events that the ethnographer can obtain through primary and secondary research.

Bronisław Malinowski developed the ethnographic method, and Franz Boas taught it in the United States. Boas' students such as Alfred L. Kroeber, Ruth Benedict and Margaret Mead drew on his conception of culture and cultural relativism to develop cultural anthropology in the United States. Simultaneously, Malinowski and A.R. Radcliffe Brown's students were developing social anthropology in the United Kingdom. Whereas cultural anthropology focused on symbols and values, social anthropology focused on social groups and institutions. Today, sociocultural anthropologists attend to all these elements.

In the early 20th century, sociocultural anthropology developed in different forms in Europe and in the United States. European "social anthropologists" focused on observed social behaviors and on "social structure", that is, on relationships among social roles (for example, husband and wife, or parent and child) and social institutions (for example, religion, economy, and politics).

American "cultural anthropologists" focused on the ways people expressed their view of themselves and their world, especially in symbolic forms, such as art and myths. These two approaches frequently converged and generally complemented one another. For example, kinship and leadership function both as symbolic systems and as social institutions. Today, almost all sociocultural anthropologists refer to the work of both sets of predecessors and have an equal interest in what people do and say.

=== Cross-cultural comparison ===
One means by which anthropologists combat ethnocentrism is to engage in cross-cultural comparison. It is important to test so-called "human universals" against the ethnographic record. Monogamy, for example, is frequently touted as a universal human trait, yet comparative studies show that it is not. The Human Relations Area Files, Inc. (HRAF) is a research agency based at Yale University. Since 1949, its mission has been to encourage and facilitate worldwide comparative studies of human culture, society, and behavior in the past and present. The name came from the Institute of Human Relations, an interdisciplinary program/building at Yale at the time. The Institute of Human Relations had sponsored HRAF's precursor, the Cross-Cultural Survey (see George Peter Murdock), as part of an effort to develop an integrated science of human behavior and culture. The two eHRAF databases on the web are expanded and updated annually. eHRAF World Cultures includes materials on cultures, past and present, and covers nearly 400 cultures. The second database, eHRAF Archaeology, covers major archaeological traditions and many more sub-traditions and sites around the world.

Comparison across cultures includes the industrialized (or de-industrialized) West. Cultures in the more traditional standard cross-cultural sample of small-scale societies are:

Africa	Nama (Hottentot); Kung (San); Thonga; Lozi; Mbundu; Suku; Bemba; Nyakyusa (Ngonde); Hadza; Luguru; Kikuyu; Ganda; Mbuti (Pygmies); Nkundo (Mongo); Banen; Tiv; Igbo; Fon; Ashanti (Twi); Mende; Bambara; Tallensi; Massa; Azande; Otoro Nuba; Shilluk; Mao; Maasai
Circum-Mediterranean	Wolof; Songhai; Wodaabe Fulani; Hausa; Fur; Kaffa; Konso; Somali; Amhara; Bogo; Kenuzi Nubian; Teda; Tuareg; Riffians; Egyptians (Fellah); Hebrews; Babylonians; Rwala Bedouin; Turks; Gheg (Albanians); Romans; Basques; Irish; Sami (Lapps); Russians; Abkhaz; Armenians; Kurd
East Eurasia	Yurak (Samoyed); Basseri; West Punjabi; Gond; Toda; Santal; Uttar Pradesh; Burusho; Kazak; Khalka Mongols; Lolo; Lepcha; Garo; Hajong; Lakher; Burmese; Lamet; Vietnamese; Rhade; Khmer; Siamese; Semang; Nicobarese; Andamanese; Vedda; Tanala; Negeri Sembilan; Atayal; Chinese; Manchu; Koreans; Japanese; Ainu; Gilyak; Yukaghir; Chukchi
Insular Pacific	Javanese (Miao); Balinese; Iban; Badjau; Toraja; Tobelorese; Alorese; Tiwi; Aranda; Orokaiva; Kimam; Kapauku; Kwoma; Manus; New Ireland; Trobrianders; Siuai; Tikopia; Pentecost; Mbau Fijians; Ajie; Maori; Marquesans; Western Samoans; Gilbertese; Marshallese; Chuukese; Yapese; Palauans; Ifugao
North America	Ingalik; Aleut; Inuit; Innu; Mi'kmaq; Saulteaux (Ojibwa); Slave; Kaska (Nahane); Eyak; Haida; Nuxalk; Skokomish; Yurok; Pomo; Yokuts; Northern Paiute; Klamath; Kutenai; Gros Ventres; Hidatsa; Pawnee; Omaha (Dhegiha); Wendat (Huron); Muscogee; Natchez; Comanche; Chiricahua; Zuni; Havasupai; Tohono O'odham; Huichol; Aztec; Popoluca
South America	Quiché; Miskito (Mosquito); Bribri (Talamanca); Cuna; Goajiro; Haitians; Calinago; Warrau (Warao); Yanomamo; Kalina (Caribs); Saramacca; Munduruku; Cubeo (Tucano); Cayapa; Jivaro; Amahuaca; Inca; Aymara; Siriono; Nambikwara; Trumai; Timbira; Tupinamba; Botocudo; Shavante; Aweikoma; Cayua (Guarani); Lengua; Abipón; Mapuche; Tehuelche; Yaghan

=== Multi-sited ethnography ===
Ethnography dominates sociocultural anthropology. Nevertheless, many contemporary sociocultural anthropologists have rejected earlier models of ethnography as treating local cultures as bounded and isolated. These anthropologists continue to concern themselves with the distinct ways people in different locales experience and understand their lives, but they often argue that one cannot understand these particular ways of life solely from a local perspective; they instead combine a focus on the local with an effort to grasp larger political, economic, and cultural frameworks that impact local lived realities. Notable proponents of this approach include Arjun Appadurai, James Clifford, George Marcus, Sidney Mintz, Michael Taussig, Eric Wolf and Ronald Daus.

A growing trend in anthropological research and analysis is the use of multi-sited ethnography, discussed in George Marcus' article, "Ethnography In/Of the World System: the Emergence of Multi-Sited Ethnography". Viewing culture as embedded in macro-constructions of a global social order, multi-sited ethnography employs traditional methodologies across various locations, both spatially and temporally. Through this methodology, greater insight can be gained when examining the impact of world-systems on local and global communities.

Also emerging in multi-sited ethnography are more interdisciplinary approaches to fieldwork that incorporate methods from cultural studies, media studies, science and technology studies, and other fields. In multi-sited ethnography, research tracks a subject across spatial and temporal boundaries. For example, a multi-sited ethnography may follow a "thing", such as a particular commodity, as it is transported through the networks of global capitalism.

Multi-sited ethnography may also follow ethnic groups in diaspora, stories or rumours that appear in multiple locations and time periods, metaphors that appear across multiple ethnographic locations, or the biographies of individuals or groups as they move through space and time. It may also follow conflicts that transcend boundaries. An example of multi-sited ethnography is Nancy Scheper-Hughes's work on the international black market for human organs. In this research, she follows organs as they are transferred through various legal and illegal networks of capitalism, as well as the rumours and urban legends that circulate in impoverished communities about child kidnapping and organ theft.

Sociocultural anthropologists have increasingly turned their investigative eye onto "Western" culture. For example, Philippe Bourgois won the Margaret Mead Award in 1997 for In Search of Respect, a study of entrepreneurs in a Harlem crack den. Also growing in popularity are ethnographies of professional communities, such as laboratory researchers, Wall Street investors, law firms, and information technology (IT) employees.

== Topics ==
=== Kinship and family ===
Kinship refers to the anthropological study of how humans form and maintain relationships with one another, and how those relationships operate within and define social organization.

Research in kinship studies often overlaps with other anthropological subfields, including medical, feminist, and public anthropology. This is likely due to its fundamental concepts, as articulated by linguistic anthropologist Patrick McConvell:

Kinship is the bedrock of all human societies that we know. All humans recognize fathers and mothers, sons and daughters, brothers and sisters, uncles and aunts, husbands and wives, grandparents, cousins, and often many more complex types of relationships, as reflected in the terminology they use. That is the matrix into which human children are born in the great majority of cases, and their first words are often kinship terms.

Throughout history, kinship studies have primarily focused on the topics of marriage, descent, and procreation. Anthropologists have written extensively on the variations within marriage across cultures and its legitimacy as a human institution. There are stark differences among communities in marital practices and values, leaving ample room for anthropological fieldwork. For instance, the Nuer of Sudan and the Brahmans of Nepal practice polygyny, where one man has several marriages to two or more women. The Nyar of India and the Nyimba of Tibet and Nepal practice polyandry, in which one woman is often married to two or more men. The marital practice found in most cultures, however, is monogamy, where one woman is married to one man. Anthropologists also study different marital taboos across cultures, most commonly the incest taboo of marriage within sibling and parent-child relationships. It has been found that all cultures have an incest taboo to some degree, but the taboo shifts between cultures when the marriage extends beyond the nuclear family unit.

There are similar foundational differences regarding procreation. Although anthropologists have found that biology is acknowledged in every culture's relationship to procreation, there are differences in how cultures assess the constructs of parenthood. For example, in the Nuyoo municipality of Oaxaca, Mexico, it is believed that a child can have partible maternity and partible paternity. In this case, a child would have multiple biological mothers in the case that it is born of one woman and then breastfed by another. A child would have multiple biological fathers in the case that the mother had sex with multiple men, following the commonplace belief in Nuyoo culture that pregnancy must be preceded by sex with multiple men to have the necessary accumulation of semen.

==== Late twentieth-century shifts in interest ====
In the twenty-first century, Western ideas of kinship have evolved beyond the traditional assumptions of the nuclear family, raising anthropological questions of consanguinity, lineage, and normative marital expectation. The shift can be traced back to the 1960s, with the reassessment of the basic principles of kinship offered by Edmund Leach, Rodney Needham, David Schneider, and others. Instead of relying on narrow ideas of Western normalcy, kinship studies increasingly catered to "more ethnographic voices, human agency, intersecting power structures, and historical context". The study of kinship evolved to accommodate for the fact that it cannot be separated from its institutional roots and must pay respect to the society in which it lives, including that society's contradictions, hierarchies, and individual experiences of those within it. This shift was progressed further by the emergence of second-wave feminism in the early 1970s, which introduced ideas of marital oppression, sexual autonomy, and domestic subordination. Other themes that emerged during this time included the frequent comparisons between Eastern and Western kinship systems and the increasing amount of attention paid to anthropologists' own societies, a swift turn from the focus that had traditionally been paid to largely "foreign", non-Western communities.

Kinship studies began to gain mainstream recognition in the late 1990s with the surge in the popularity of feminist anthropology, particularly its work on biological anthropology and the intersectional critique of gender relations. At this time, "Postcolonial feminism" emerged, a movement that argued that kinship studies could not examine the gender relations of developing countries in isolation and must also respect racial and economic nuances. This critique became relevant, for instance, in the anthropological study of Jamaica: race and class were seen as the primary obstacles to Jamaican liberation from economic imperialism, and gender as an identity was largely ignored. Third World feminism aimed to combat this in the early twenty-first century by promoting these categories as coexisting factors. In Jamaica, marriage as an institution is often substituted for a series of partners, as poor women cannot rely on regular financial contributions in a climate of economic instability. In addition, there is a common practice among Jamaican women of artificially lightening their skin to secure economic survival. These anthropological findings, according to Third World feminism, cannot treat gender, racial, or class differences as separate entities; instead, they must acknowledge that these differences interact to produce unique individual experiences.

==== Rise of reproductive anthropology ====
Kinship studies have also seen a rise in interest in reproductive anthropology with the advancement of assisted reproductive technologies (ARTs), including in vitro fertilization (IVF). These advancements have led to new dimensions of anthropological research, as they challenge the Western standard of biogenetically based kinship, relatedness, and parenthood. According to anthropologists Maria C. Inhorn and Daphna Birenbaum-Carmeli, "ARTs have pluralized notions of relatedness and led to a more dynamic notion of "kinning" namely, kinship as a process, as something under construction, rather than a natural given". With this technology, questions of kinship have emerged over the difference between biological and genetic relatedness, as gestational surrogates can provide a biological environment for the embryo while the genetic ties remain with a third party. If genetic, surrogate, and adoptive maternities are involved, anthropologists have acknowledged that there can be the possibility for three "biological" mothers to a single child. With ARTs, there are also anthropological questions concerning the intersections between wealth and fertility: ARTs are generally only available to those in the highest income bracket, meaning the infertile poor are inherently devalued in the system. There have also been issues of reproductive tourism and bodily commodification, as individuals seek economic security through hormonal stimulation and egg harvesting, which are potentially harmful procedures. With IVF specifically, there have been many questions about the value of the embryo and the status of life, particularly as they relate to the manufacture of stem cells, testing, and research.

Current issues in kinship studies, such as adoption, have revealed and challenged the Western cultural disposition towards the genetic, "blood" tie. Western biases against single parent homes have also been explored through similar anthropological research, uncovering that a household with a single parent experiences "greater levels of scrutiny and [is] routinely seen as the 'other' of the nuclear, patriarchal family". The power dynamics in reproduction, when explored through a comparative analysis of "conventional" and "unconventional" families, have been used to dissect the Western assumptions of child bearing and child rearing in contemporary kinship studies.

==== Critiques of kinship studies ====
Kinship, as an anthropological field of inquiry, has been heavily criticized across the discipline. One critique is that at its inception, the framework of kinship studies was overly structured and formulaic, relying on dense language and stringent rules. Another critique, explored at length by American anthropologist David Schneider, argues that kinship has been limited by its inherent Western ethnocentrism. Schneider proposes that kinship is not a field that can be applied cross-culturally, as the theory itself relies on European assumptions of normalcy. He states in the widely circulated 1984 book A critique of the study of kinship that "[K]inship has been defined by European social scientists, and European social scientists use their own folk culture as the source of many, if not all of their ways of formulating and understanding the world about them". However, this critique has been challenged by the argument that it is linguistics, not cultural divergence, that has allowed for a European bias, and that the bias can be lifted by centering the methodology on fundamental human concepts. Polish anthropologist Anna Wierzbicka argues that "mother" and "father" are examples of such fundamental human concepts and can only be Westernized when conflated with English concepts such as "parent" and "sibling".

A more recent critique of kinship studies is its solipsistic focus on privileged, Western human relations and its promotion of normative ideals of human exceptionalism. In Critical Kinship Studies, social psychologists Elizabeth Peel and Damien Riggs argue for moving beyond this human-centered framework, opting instead to explore kinship through a "posthumanist" vantage point, in which anthropologists focus on the intersecting relationships among human animals, non-human animals, technologies, and practices.

=== Institutional anthropology ===
The role of anthropology in institutions has expanded significantly since the end of the 20th century. Much of this development can be attributed to the rise in anthropologists working outside of academia and the increasing importance of globalization in both institutions and the field of anthropology. Anthropologists can be employed by institutions such as for-profit businesses, nonprofit organizations, and governments. For instance, cultural anthropologists are commonly employed by the United States federal government.

The two types of institutions defined in anthropology are total institutions and social institutions. Total institutions are places that comprehensively coordinate the actions of people within them, and examples of total institutions include prisons, convents, and hospitals. Social institutions, on the other hand, are constructs that regulate individuals' day-to-day lives, such as kinship, religion, and economics. Anthropology of institutions may analyze labor unions, businesses ranging from small enterprises to corporations, government, medical organizations, education, prisons, and financial institutions. Nongovernmental organizations have garnered particular interest in the field of institutional anthropology because they are capable of fulfilling roles previously ignored by governments, or previously realized by families or local groups, in an attempt to mitigate social problems.

The types and methods of scholarship in the anthropology of institutions can take many forms. Institutional anthropologists may study the relationship between organizations or between an organization and other parts of society. Institutional anthropology may also focus on the inner workings of an institution, such as the relationships, hierarchies, and cultures formed, and the ways that these elements are transmitted and maintained, transformed, or abandoned over time. Additionally, some anthropology of institutions examines the specific design of institutions and their corresponding strength. More specifically, anthropologists may analyze specific events within an institution, perform semiotic investigations, or analyze the mechanisms by which knowledge and culture are organized and dispersed.

In all manifestations of institutional anthropology, participant observation is critical to understanding the intricacies of how an institution works and the consequences of individuals' actions within it. Simultaneously, anthropology of institutions extends beyond examination of the commonplace involvement of individuals in institutions to discover how and why the organizational principles evolved in the manner that they did.

Common considerations taken by anthropologists in studying institutions include the physical location at which a researcher places themselves, as important interactions often take place in private; the fact that the members of an institution are often being examined in their workplace and may not have much idle time to discuss the details of their everyday endeavors. The ability of individuals to present the workings of an institution in a particular light or frame must additionally be taken into account when using interviews and document analysis to understand an institution, as the involvement of an anthropologist may be met with distrust when information being released to the public is not directly controlled by the institution and could potentially be damaging.

== See also ==
- Age-area hypothesis – Concept in cultural anthropology
- Anthropology of religion – Study of religion in relation to other social institutions
- Bibliography of anthropology
- Ceremonial pole – Stake or post used in ritual practice
- Community studies – Academic field in the study of community
- Communitas – Latin noun for an unstructured community
- Cross-cultural psychology – Scientific study of human behaviour
- Cultural psychology – How cultures reflect and shape their psychology
- Cultural evolution – Evolutionary theory of social change
- Cultural relativism – Anthropological view
- Culture change – Term in public policy
- Culturology – Branch of social sciences
- Digital anthropology – Subdiscipline of anthropology
- Engaged theory – Comprehensive critical theory
- Ethnobotany – Study of traditional plant use
- Ethnomusicology – Study of the cultural aspects of music
- Ethnozoology – Study of human and animal interaction
- Folkloristics – Branch of anthropology
- Guilt–shame–fear spectrum of cultures – Main emotion used for social control
- Intangible cultural heritage – Type of cultural heritage
- Kluckhohn and Strodtbeck's values orientation theory – Theory on universal problems in human societies
- Nomad – Person without fixed habitat
- Sociology of culture – Branch of sociology
