= List of Timothy Asch films =

This is a list of films by the visual ethnographer Timothy Asch.

== 1960s ==
Dodoth Morning (1963)
By Timothy Asch

A documentary film that follows the Dodoth people in northeast Uganda in 1961. This film features a time when too much rain threatened to rot the millet that is grown to supplement their diet, and the events that follow. The film is distributed by Documentary Educational Resources.

The Feast (1969)
by ethnographic filmmakers Tim Asch and Napoleon Chagnon.

Strongly informed by Marcel Mauss' The Gift, the film focuses on a visit between villages and presents an analysis of the politics of exchange and interaction that occur.

Awards & Festivals

CINE Golden Eagle
American Film Festival Blue Ribbon
Flaherty Award
Festival dei Popoli, Florence, Italy
Venice International Art Film Festival
International Folklore & Tourism Festival, Grand Prize
Philadelphia International Festival of Short Films, Exceptional Merit

== 1970s ==
Yanomamo: A Multidisciplinary Study (1971)
by ethnographic filmmakers Tim Asch and Napoleon Chagnon

The film follows a multidisciplinary study team and their Venezuelan colleagues in the attempt to better understand all facets of the Yanomamo culture. The film is distributed by Documentary Educational Resources.

Ocamo Is My Town (1974)
by ethnographic filmmakers Tim Asch and Napoleon Chagnon.

A documentary film that follows the work of a Salesian priest, Padre Cocco, who has headed a mission on the Ocamo River since 1957, in order to lessen the impact of "civilization" on the Yanomamo of this area. The film is distributed by Documentary Educational Resources.

Arrow Game (1974)
A short documentary film by ethnographic filmmaker Tim Asch that shows young members of the Yanomamo Indian tribe sharpening their arrow-shooting skills.

Weeding the Garden (1974)
by ethnographic filmmaker Tim Asch

a short documentary film that shows Dedeheiwa, a Yanomami shaman, as he tends to his manioc garden.

A Father Washes His Children (1974)
by ethnographic filmmaker Tim Asch

A short documentary film that shows Dedeheiwa, a Yanomami leader and shaman, as he washes his nine children and grandchildren in a nearby river.

Firewood (1974)

A Man and His Wife Weave a Hammock (1974)
by ethnographic filmmakers Tim Asch and Napoleon Chagnon.

A documentary film that shows a Yanomami tribe member weaving a hammock, as his wife watches at his side. The film is distributed by Documentary Educational Resources.

Children's Magical Death (1974)

Magical Death (1974)
by ethnographic filmmakers Napoleon Chagnon and Tim Asch.

A documentary film that explores the role of the shaman within the Yanomamo Indian culture, as well as the close relationship shamanism shares with politics within the society. The acclaimed film was the recipient of the American Film Festival Blue Ribbon.

Climbing the Peach Palm (1974)

New Tribes Mission (1974)

Yanomamo, a one-hour special for Japanese television (1974)

The Ax Fight (1975)
By anthropologist and filmmaker Tim Asch, his wife Patsy Asch, and anthropologist Napoleon Chagnon

An ethnographic film about a conflict in a Yanomami village called Mishimishimabowei-teri, in southern Venezuela. It is best known as an iconic and idiosyncratic ethnographic film about the Yanomamo and is frequently shown in classroom settings.

The film has four parts and operates on a number of analytical levels. It opens with a map of the region where the village is located and then proceeds to about ten minutes of virtually unedited film footage of combat among multiple participants armed with clubs, machetes, and axes. This represents the entirety of the film shot of the fight, which lasted about half an hour. Many of the shots and accompanying audio reflect the fact that the Westerners were taken by surprise and that they remained in ignorance about the cause of the fight until some time later.
The fight, which occurred on the second day of Asch and Chagnon's arrival to the village on February 28, 1971, is presented to the viewer as it was experienced by the anthropologist and filmmaker, as chaotic and unstructured violence. The second part of the Ax Fight, however, replays the events in slow motion while Chagnon explains who the combatants are and describes their relationship to one another. Although they initially believe the fight occurred because of an incestuous relationship, the anthropologists learn that this is not the case and that the fight is the latest manifestation of long standing hostility between a faction that lives in the village and a faction that is among a party of visitors. The fight is explained as "a ritualized contest, not a brawl" in which combatants make a relatively orderly progression from less lethal weapons to more lethal ones and people choose sides in the dispute on the basis of kinship obligations and shared histories. Eventually, elders (who tend to have conflicting loyalties) step in to help end the conflict.
The third part of the film uses a number of kinship diagrams to further elaborate on these family bonds and explains how kinship and political systems are often interchangeable in Yanomamo life. The final part of the film replays an edited version of the fight, intended to illustrate the effect that the process of editing has on the construction of anthropological knowledge.
Controversy: In 2007, The Ax Fight was re-examined by filmmaker Adam Curtis in his documentary program The Trap. Curtis interviewed Chagnon, and suggested that the presence of the film crew, and their distribution of machetes to some but not all of the Yanomamo, may have altered the behavior that Chagnon and the Aschs were there to observe; Chagnon was so displeased by these suggestions that he immediately terminated the interview.

A Man Called "Bee": Studying the Yanomamo (1975)
by ethnographic filmmakers Tim Asch and Napoleon Chagnon.

Awards & Festivals

CINE Golden Eagle
American Film Festival Red Ribbon
Film Council of Greater Columbus, Chris Bronze Award

Moonblood (1975)

Tapir Distribution (1975)

Tug Of War (1975)

Bride Service (1975)
by ethnographic filmmakers Tim Asch and Napoleon A. Chagnon

A 1975 short documentary film that explores Yanomamo gender roles, division of labor, and obligations within the family.

The Yanomamo Myth of Naro as Told By Kaobawa (1975)

The Yanomamo Myth of Naro as Told By Dedeheiwa (1975)

Jaguar: A Yanomamo Twin-Cycle Myth (1976)

O

The Sons of Haji Omar (1978)

A Balinese Trance Seance (1979)
By ethnographic filmmaker Tim Asch and anthropologist Linda Connor

A documentary film that profiles Jero Tapakan, a Balinese spirit medium.

== 1980s ==
Jero on Jero: A Balinese Trance Seance Observed (1980) with Linda Connor.

Jero Tapakan: Stories From the Life of a Balinese Healer (1983) with Linda Connor

The Medium is the Masseuse: A Balinese Massage (1983) with Linda Connor

The Water of Words (1983) with James J. Fox

Spear and Sword (1988) with James J. Fox

== 1990s ==
Releasing the Spirits (1990) Patsy Asch, Linda Connor & Timothy Asch

A documentary film about a collective cremation in Jero Tapakan's hamlet

A Celebration of Origins (1992)
By ethnographic filmmaker Tim Asch, Patsy Asch & E. Douglas Lewis

A documentary film that displays the people of Wai Brama, and their first celebration since 1960 of traditional ceremonial and social system rituals.
