= A Balinese Trance Seance =

- Directed by: Tim Asch
- Distributed by: Documentary Educational Resources
- Release date: 1979
- Running time: 47 minutes
- Country: United States
- Language: English

A Balinese Trance Seance is a 1979 documentary film by ethnographic filmmaker Tim Asch and anthropologist Linda Connor that profiles Jero Tapakan, a Balinese spirit medium. It was one of five films that were made with Jero Tapakan and were considered to be exemplary ethnographic films.

The film was the first in the series; the later films were: Jero on Jero: "A Balinese Trance Seance" Observed (1981), The Medium is the Masseuse: A Balinese Massage (1983), and Jero Tapakan: Stories From the Life of a Balinese Healer (1983).
