= Michael Stuart Ani =

American writer, musician and explorer

Michael Stuart Ani is an American writer, musician and explorer notable for residing with the Yanomami people of the Amazon rainforest in the 1980s. He co-founded the Amazonia Foundation in 1991 and has collaborated with several anthropologists, most notably Napoleon Chagnon.
