= Public anthropology =

Approach within anthropology

Public anthropology, a concept introduced by Robert Borofsky, involves two interrelated senses of the term 'public’. The first turns inward, subjecting anthropology’s institutional practices to public scrutiny and asking why the field has struggled to produce cumulative knowledge about the populations it studies. To address this limitation, public anthropology emphasizes research transparency—notably the accessibility of fieldnotes—so that ethnographic claims can be revisited and extended over time. The second meaning turns outward, asserting anthropology’s responsibility to bear ethnographic witness to different ways of life and leveraging this knowledge to address larger social issues of our time, following the community-building model of Partners In Health.

At its core lies a commitment embodied in Justice Louis Brandeis’s famous assertion: “Publicity is justly commended as a remedy for social and industrial diseases. Sunlight is said to be the best of disinfectants; electric light the most efficient policeman” (Brandeis 1914:92).

== Relation to applied anthropology ==
Merrill Singer has criticized the concept of public anthropology on the grounds that it ignores applied anthropology. He wrote: "given that many applied anthropologists already do the kinds of things that are now being described as PA, it is hard to understand why a new label is needed, except as a device for distancing public anthropologists from applied anthropologists" (Singer 2000: 6). Similarly, Barbara Rylko-Bauer wrote: "one has to ask what is the purpose of these emerging labels that consciously distinguish themselves from applied/practicing anthropology? While they may serve the personal interests of those who develop them, it is hard to see how they serve the broader interests of the discipline" (Rylko-Bauer 2000: 6). Eric Haanstad responded to Singer's claim by arguing that public anthropology does not necessarily entail the exclusion of applied anthropology (Haanstad 2001a). Alan Jeffery Fields defended the concept of public anthropology by claiming it is "a useful trope for one important reason: it calls attention to the fact that there is a division between public and academic perceptions" (Fields 2001a). Rather than get drawn into what Sigmund Freud calls the “narcissism of small differences,” Paul Farmer and Robert Borofsky believe that anthropology should focus on broader issues, especially those relevant to the public at large.

The Center for a Public Anthropology’s website outlines four strategies that emphasize public anthropology’s paradigm-shifting intent (https://www.publicanthropology.org/about/)

Benefitting Others. Rejecting the minimalist ethic of “do no harm” in favor of a more positive, affirmative stance – one that seeks to benefit others by addressing social inequalities and alleviating suffering both in print and in practice.

Fostering Alternative Forms of Accountability. Challenging evaluation systems that privilege publication quantity, and instead, focusing more on the real-world impact of anthropological research.

Transparency. Calling on anthropologists to share their fieldnotes to enable cumulative knowledge, while also exposing the patronage dynamics that govern hiring and publication within the discipline.

Collaborating with others. Insisting that meaningful change requires working alongside non-academic partners rather than speaking only to disciplinary insiders.

== See also ==
- Public sociology
