= Ethnovideography =

Ethnovideography is a methodology of using video in the study of peoples, communities, groups or sub-groups. It espouses the use of video to document reality instead of "creating" realities. Hence, ethnovideographic presentations are unscripted. Narrations, background music, sound effects and special effects are not employed. The use of artificial lighting, obtrusive hardware, production crews and all but the simplest camera technique are discouraged.

Although originally experimented upon by the Los Baños science community in the Philippines in the early 1990s as adjuncts to environmental impact assessments (EIAs), studies of indigenous knowledge systems and documentation of agricultural best practice, it traces its roots in the cinéma vérité movement of the 1950s and 1960s, the difference being its emphasis on small format or digital format video and its adoption of extra-sociological subjects. Being a methodology, ethnovideography is theory-based and adopts a set of procedures or protocols.

== History ==
The earliest mention of ethnovideography in current literature comes from an Asian Development Bank project document written by a team of environmental consultants headed by Sylvia Guerrero, former Dean of the University of the Philippines College of Social Work and Community Development. Guerrero et al. (1992) defined ethnovideography as:

...a research procedure developed at the UPLB Institute of Development Communication, which makes use of small-format video-generated non-alphanumeric data for social analysis. This procedure entails video documentation of five types of subjects: people, places, processes, events and social problems...

Credited for coining the term ethnovideography as well as its development as a methodology, Alexander Flor considers it more than a research procedure but a knowledge management system and a form of development intervention as well. Flor was a professor of development communication at the University of the Philippines Los Banos who underwent a Fulbright-PAEF post-doctoral tour in the US in 1989. The tour included a summer at the USC Center for Visual Anthropology, wherein exposure to the use of video in urban anthropology contributed to his early constructs on ethnovideography. Other influences include Professor Alain Martenot who mentored Flor on Direct Cinema technique under a French Foreign Ministry grant. His early work on ethnovideography was sponsored by the Users' Perspectives with Agricultural and Rural Development (UPWARD) facility of the Lima-based International Potato Center. Succeeding research was conducted mostly by development communication graduate students, e.g. Bandara, Hardono, and Maya. Recently, ethnovideographic studies have been uploaded to YouTube.

In 2002, the book Ethnovideography: Video Based Indigenous Knowledge Systems was co-published by SEAMEO-SEARCA and CIP-UPWARD.
