= Yanomamö: The Fierce People =

1968 book by Napoleon Chagnon

- First paperback edition, 1967
- Authors: Napoleon Chagnon
- Language: English
- Subject: anthropological study of Yanomami
- Publisher: Holt, Rinehart and Winston
- Publication date: 1968
- Pages: xiv, 142
- ISBN: 9780030710704
- OCLC: 68650

Yanomamö: The Fierce People is a 1968 book by American cultural anthropologist Napoleon Chagnon. It is an ethnographic study of the Yanomami people of the Amazon.

The book has become a bestseller and widely used in university anthropology classes. It has also been controversial for its depiction of Yanomamö society as particularly violent, and Chagnon's interpretation that this characteristic is a result of biological differences acquired through natural selection.

== Contents ==
The book is an anthropological study of the Yanomami people whom Chagnon observed. As the book title implies, Chagnon characterized them as very violent, with said violence serving the purpose related to natural selection: as noted by a reviewer, "the men who killed the most enemies, [Chagnon] asserted, tended to have more wives and children — so passing on the genes that made the successful warriors and leaders."

== Reception ==
=== Impact ===
The book had several editions, selling nearly a million copies. It is commonly used as a text in university-level introductory anthropology classes, making it one of the bestselling anthropological texts of all time. The book has also been argued to have made the Yanomami, "the most famous (and infamous) tribal people in the world."

=== Reviews ===
Writer James Wilson writing for The Ecologist noted the book's success can be seen as a combination of good writing (Wilson called Chagnon "a born storyteller") and explosive contents — the description of a very violent society ("brutal, cruel, treacherous" people, living "in a state of chronic warfare", whose leaders were "under the influence of hallucinogenic snuff, summoning up blood-curdling spirits to pursue their vendettas by magic").

Anthropologist Christopher Crocker of University of Virginia reviewed the work in 1969 for the American Anthropologist. He observed that Chagnon relies on the alliance theory to explain his findings. Crocker outlines some problems with the study (ex. "Chagnon consistently fails to relate the Yanomamo normative rules and beliefs to the practices he describes") and concluded that "Morgan and McLennan would have been, I think, enthusiastic about this work; my own reaction is somewhat less positive".

=== Controversy and criticism ===
While praised by some, like E. O. Wilson, Chagnon's work with the Yanomamö was criticized by a number of other anthropologists. Critics have taken issue with both aspects of his research methods as well as the theoretical approach, and the interpretations and conclusions he drew from his data. Most controversial was his claim that Yanomamö society is particularly violent (i.e. his labelling of Yanomami as 'fierce'), and his claim that this feature of their culture is grounded in biological differences that are the result of natural selection. His research was alleged to have hurt the Yanomami, by supposedly discouraging initiatives aimed at preserving their culture and encouraging abuse of Yanomami by the Brazilian authorities.

As a result of the controversy and the alleged unethical practices with the Yanomami, Chagnon was barred by the Venezuelan government from studying the Yanomami and from reentering their territory in Venezuela. Chagnon's study of Yanomami has been described as "one of anthropology's most famous and explosive imbroglios".

Several books have tackled the controversy. In 1997 anthropologist Frank A. Salamone published The Yanomami and Their Interpreters: Fierce People or Fierce Interpreters?, discussing the conflict between Chagnon and Salesian missionaries. One of the fiercest critics of Chagnon was investigative journalist Patrick Tierney, who criticized Chagnon's study in his 2000 book Darkness in El Dorado. Tierney accused Chagnon of unethical practices during his research. The American Anthropological Association convened a task force in February 2001 to investigate some of the allegations made in Tierney's book, at first finding that some of Tierney's claims were correct, but later rescinding that conclusion. Alice Dreger, a historian of medicine and science, concluded after a year's research that Tierney's claims were false and the Association was complicit and irresponsible in helping spread these falsehoods and not protecting "scholars from baseless and sensationalistic charges". The controversy is covered in the 2005 book Yanomami: The Fierce Controversy and What We Can Learn from It by anthropologist Robert Borofsky. Chagnon revisited the topic in his later book, 2013 Noble Savages: My Life Among Two Dangerous Tribes: the Yanomamo and the Anthropologists.

== See also ==
- The Ax Fight
- Magical Death
