= A Man Called "Bee": Studying the Yanomamo =

- Directed by: Tim Asch; Napoleon Chagnon
- Distributed by: Documentary Educational Resources
- Release date: 1974
- Running time: 40 minutes
- Country: United States
- Language: English

A Man Called "Bee": Studying the Yanomamo is a 1974 film by ethnographic filmmakers Tim Asch and Napoleon Chagnon. While he was studying the Yanomamo people, Napoleon Chagnon used many different ethnographic research methods. Some of those methods included participant observation, key informants, tape recording and in depth interviews. Ethnography is based on fieldwork. In order for Chagnon to create this film about the Yanomamo people, he had to take part in their events he was observing, describing, and analyzing.

== Awards and festivals ==
- CINE Golden Eagle
- American Film Festival Red Ribbon
- Film Council of Greater Columbus, Chris Bronze Award
