= Anthropology of media =

Scientific study of the creation of mass communications and its workers

Anthropology of media (also anthropology of mass media, media anthropology) is an area of study within social or cultural anthropology that emphasizes ethnographic studies as a means of understanding producers, audiences, and other cultural and social aspects of mass media.

== Methodology ==
The use of qualitative methods, particularly ethnography, distinguishes media anthropology from other disciplinary approaches to mass media. Within media studies, media ethnographies have been of increasing interest since the 1980s. However, as Stephen Putnam Hughes remarks in a recent review, these studies often do not engage in rigorous ethnographic fieldwork, ignoring or misapplying such landmark anthropological techniques as participant observation or long-term fieldwork. Given such differences, anthropologists who take an interest in the media see themselves as forming a distinct subfield from ethnographic approaches to media studies and cultural studies.

== Theory ==
The anthropology of media is a fairly inter-disciplinary area, with a wide range of other influences. The theories used in the anthropology of media range from practice approaches, associated with theorists such as Pierre Bourdieu, as well as discussions of the appropriation and adaptation of new technologies and practices. Theoretical approaches have also been adopted from visual anthropology and from film theory, as well as from studies of ritual and performance studies (e.g. dance and theatre), studies of consumption, audience reception in media studies, new media and network theories, theories of globalisation, theories of international civil society, and discussions on participatory communications and governance in development studies.

== Ethnographic contexts ==
The types of ethnographic contexts explored in the anthropology of media range from contexts of media production (e.g., ethnographies of newsrooms in newspapers, journalists in the field, film production) to contexts of media reception, following audiences in their everyday responses to media such as newspaper cartoons (Khanduri 2014). Other types include cyber anthropology, a relatively new area of internet research, as well as ethnographies of other areas of research which happen to involve media, such as development work, social movements, human rights or health education. This is in addition to many classic ethnographic contexts, where media such as radio, the press, new media and television (Mankekar 1999, Abu-Lughod 2005) have started to make their presences felt since the early 1990s.

== See also ==
- Mediatization (media)
- Social aspects of television
- Visual anthropology

== Bibliography ==
- Powdermaker, Hortense. (1950). Hollywood, the Dream Factory: An Anthropologist Looks at the Movie-Makers. Boston: Little, Brown.
- Eiselein, E.B. & Martin Topper. (1976). 'Media Anthropology: A Theoretical Framework'. Human Organization, 35.2: 113-121.
- Spitulnik, Deborah. (1993). ‘Anthropology and Mass Media’, Annual Review of Anthropology, 22: 293-315.
- Banks, Marcus & Howard Morphy. (1997). Rethinking Visual Anthropology. New Haven: Yale University Press.
- Dickey, Sara. (1997). ‘Anthropology and Its Contributions to the Study of Mass Media’, International Social Science Journal, 153 : 413-427.
- Mankekar, Purnima. (1999). Screening Culture, Viewing Politics: An Ethnography of Television, Womanhood, and Nation in Postcolonial India. Durham: Duke University Press.
- Askew, Kelly & Richard R. Wilk. (2002). The Anthropology of Media: A Reader. Malden: Blackwell Publishers.
- Ginsburg, Faye, Abu-Lughod, Lila & Brian Larkin (eds.). (2002). Media Worlds: Anthropology on New Terrain. Berkeley: University of California Press.
- Peterson, Mark Allen. (2003). Anthropology and Mass Communication: Media and Myth in the New Millennium. New York: Berghahn Books.
- Born, Georgina. (2004). Uncertain Vision: Birt, Dyke, and the Reinvention of the BBC. London: Secker & Warburg.
- Rothenbuhler, Eric & Mihai Coman. (2005). Media Anthropology. Thousand Oaks: SAGE Publications.
- Larkin, Brian. (2008). Signal and Noise: Media, Infrastructure and Urban Culture in Nigeria. Durham: Duke University Press.
- Paalman, Floris. (2011). Cinematic Rotterdam: The Times and Tides of a Modern City. Rotterdam: 010 Publishers.
- Ganti, Tejaswini. (2012). Producing Bollywood: Inside the Contemporary Hindi Film Industry. Durham & London: Duke University Press.
- Wortham, Erica. (2013)."Indigenous Media in Mexico: Culture, Community and the State". Duke University Press.
- Khanduri, Ritu (2014). Caricaturing Culture in India: Cartoons and History of the Modern World. Cambridge: Cambridge University Press.
- Martin, Sylvia J. (2017). Haunted: An Ethnography of the Hollywood and Hong Kong Media Industries. New York: Oxford University Press.
