= Dodoth Morning =

- Directed by: Tim Asch
- Distributed by: Documentary Educational Resources
- Release date: 1976
- Running time: 20 minutes
- Country: United States
- Language: English

Dodoth Morning is a 1976 film by ethnographic filmmaker Tim Asch.

A documentary film that follows a morning in the life of a family of the Dodoth people in northeast Uganda in 1961. It was completed in 1963.

The film is distributed by Documentary Educational Resources.
