= USC Jane Goodall Research Center =

Anthropological research center

The USC Jane Goodall Research Center is a part of the department of Anthropology at the University of Southern California. It is co-directed by professors of anthropology Craig Stanford, Chris Boehm, Nayuta Yamashita, and Roberto Delgado.

The center was established in 1991 with the joint appointment of Jane Goodall as Distinguished Emeritus Professor in Anthropology and Occupational Science. The center offers USC students the chance to study in Gombe.

== See also ==
- USC Center for Visual Anthropology
