= USC Center for Visual Anthropology =

The USC Center for Visual Anthropology (CVA) is a center located at the University of Southern California. It is dedicated to the field of visual anthropology, incorporating visual modes of expression in the academic discipline of anthropology. It does so in conjunction with faculty in the anthropology department through five types of activities: training, research and analysis of visual culture, production of visual projects, archiving and collecting, and the sponsorship of conferences and film festivals. It offers a B.A. and an MVA in Visual Anthropology.

== History ==
The CVA was founded and directed by Ira Abrams in collaboration with Barbara Myerhoff. Tim Asch took over as director of the CVA in 1983. In 1984, he collaborated with the USC School of Cinematic Arts to create the MAVA degree (Master of Arts in Visual Anthropology), a 2-3 year terminal Masters program unique in its emphasis on both textual and visual media (film and photography) as components of an academically grounded research project. Asch served as director of the CVA until his death in 1994. In 2001, the MAVA program was merged into a Certificate in Visual Anthropology given alongside the Ph.D. in anthropology. For a number of years, the CVA served as the west coast venue for the Margaret Mead Film Festival. A new one year version of the Masters of Arts in Visual Anthropology was established in 2008, which focuses on the production of a half-hour ethnographic documentary over a twelve-month period. Over thirty new ethnographic documentaries (including the Oscar nominee Gang Cops) have already been produced in this new program, and many of them are now in distribution and shown at film festivals.

== See also ==
- USC Jane Goodall Research Center
