= Gang Cops =

1988 film

- Directed by: Thomas B. Fleming; Daniel Marks
- Produced by: Thomas B. Fleming; Daniel Marks
- Production companies: USC Center for Visual Anthropology and the School of Cinema/Television
- Distributed by: OneWest Media
- Release date: 1988
- Country: United States
- Language: English

Gang Cops is a 1988 American short documentary film directed by Thomas B. Fleming.

== Synopsis ==
The film follows the Los Angeles County Sheriff's Department's special gang unit in South Central Los Angeles.

== Production ==
It was produced in collaboration with the USC Center for Visual Anthropology and the School of Cinema/Television.

== Accolades ==
The film was nominated for an Academy Award for Best Documentary Short.
