= The Trap (British TV series) =

2007 documentary series by Adam Curtis

- Title screen
- Also known as: The Trap: What Happened to Our Dream of Freedom
- Written by: Adam Curtis
- Directed by: Adam Curtis
- Country of origin: United Kingdom
- Original language: English
- No. of series: 1
- No. of episodes: 3

Production
- Executive producer: Stephen Lambert
- Producers: Adam Curtis; Lucy Kelsall
- Running time: 180 mins (in three parts)
- Production company: BBC

Original release
- Network: BBC Two
- Release: 11 March – 25 March 2007

Related
- The Power of Nightmares (2004); All Watched Over by Machines of Loving Grace (2011)

The Trap: What Happened to Our Dream of Freedom is a BBC television documentary series by British English filmmaker Adam Curtis. It was originally broadcast in the United Kingdom on BBC Two in March 2007. The series consists of three 60-minute episodes which explore the modern concept and definition of freedom, specifically, "how a simplistic model of human beings as self-seeking, almost robotic, creatures led to today's idea of freedom."

== Production ==
The series was originally to be called Cold Cold Heart and was scheduled for broadcast in 2006. Although it is not known what caused the delay in transmission, nor the change in title, it is known that a DVD release of Curtis's previous series The Power of Nightmares had been delayed due to problems with copyright clearance due to the large quantity of archive material used in Curtis's montage technique. Another documentary series (title unknown) based on very similar lines—"examining the world economy during the 1990s"—was to have been Curtis's first BBC TV project upon moving to the BBC's Current Affairs unit in 2002, shortly after producing Century of the Self.

== Episodes ==
=== Part 1. "F**k You Buddy" ===
In part one, Curtis examines the rise of game theory during the Cold War and the way in which its mathematical models of human behaviour filtered into economic thought. The programme traces the development of game theory, with particular reference to the work of John Nash, who believed that all humans are inherently suspicious and selfish creatures that strategize constantly. Building on his theory, Nash constructed logically consistent and mathematically verifiable models, for which he won the Nobel Prize in Economics. He invented system games that reflected his beliefs about human behaviour, including one he called 'Fuck You Buddy' (later published as "So Long Sucker"), in which the only way to win was to betray your playing partner, and it is from this game that the episode's title is taken.

These games were internally coherent and worked correctly as long as the players obeyed the ground rules that they should behave selfishly and try to outwit their opponents, but when RAND's analysts tried the games on their own secretaries, they were surprised to find that instead of betraying each other, the secretaries cooperated every time. This did not, in the eyes of the analysts, discredit the models, but proved that the secretaries were unfit subjects. "This is in contrast to the proposed theoretical solution in which the two secretaries would have shared the amount g only, with the first secretary receiving m in addition. Upon inquiry, it developed that they had entered into the experiment with the prior agreement to share all proceeds equally!"

It was not known at the time that Nash was suffering from paranoid schizophrenia, and as a result, he was deeply suspicious of everyone around him—including his colleagues—and was convinced that many were involved in conspiracies against him. It was this mistaken belief that led to his view of people as a whole that formed the basis for his theories. Footage of an older and wiser Nash was shown in which he acknowledges that his paranoid views of other people at the time were false. Curtis examines how game theory was used to create the US's nuclear strategy during the Cold War. Because no nuclear war occurred, it was believed that game theory had been correct in dictating the creation and maintenance of a massive American nuclear arsenal—because the Soviet Union had not attacked America with its nuclear weapons, the supposed deterrent must have worked. Game theory during the Cold War is a subject that Curtis examined in more detail in the To the Brink of Eternity part of his first series, Pandora's Box, and he reuses much of the same archive material in doing so.

Archive interview with R. D. Laing during episode 1

Another strand in the documentary is the work of R. D. Laing, whose work in psychiatry led him to model familial interactions using game theory. His conclusion was that humans are inherently selfish and shrewd and spontaneously generate stratagems during everyday interactions. Laing's theories became more developed when he concluded that some forms of mental illness were merely artificial labels, used by the state to suppress individual suffering. This belief became a staple tenet of counter-culture in the 1960s. Reference is made to the Rosenhan experiment run by one of Laing's students, David Rosenhan, in which bogus patients, self-presenting at a number of American psychiatric institutions, were falsely diagnosed as having mental disorders, while institutions, informed that they were to receive bogus patients, misidentified genuine patients as imposters. The results of the experiment were a disaster for American psychiatry, because they destroyed the idea that psychiatrists were a privileged elite that was genuinely able to diagnose, and therefore treat, mental illness.

Curtis credits the Rosenhan experiment with the inspiration to create a computer model of mental health. Input to the program consisted of answers to a questionnaire. Curtis describes a plan of the psychiatrists to test the computer model by issuing questionnaires to "hundreds of thousands" of randomly selected Americans. The diagnostic program identified over 50% of the ordinary people tested as suffering from some kind of mental disorder. According to Jerome Wakefield, who refers to the test as "these studies", the results it found were viewed as a general conclusion that "there is a hidden epidemic." Leaders in the psychiatric field never addressed whether the computer model was being tested or used without having been validated in any way, but rather used the model to justify vastly increasing the portion of the population they were treating.

In an interview, the economist James M. Buchanan decries the notion of the "public interest", asking what it is and suggesting that it consists purely of the self-interest of the governing bureaucrats. Buchanan also proposes that organisations should employ managers who are motivated only by money. He describes those who are motivated by other factors—such as job satisfaction or a sense of public duty—as "zealots". At the start of the 1970s, the theories of Laing and the models of Nash began to converge, leading to a popular belief that the state (a surrogate family) was purely and simply a mechanism of social control which calculatedly kept power out of the hands of the public. Curtis shows that it was this belief which allowed the theories of Hayek to look credible, and underpinned the free-market beliefs of Margaret Thatcher, who sincerely believed that by dismantling as much of the British state as possible—and placing former nationalised institutions into the hands of public shareholders—a form of social equilibrium could be reached. This was a return to Nash's work, in which he proved mathematically that if everyone pursued their own interests, a stable, yet perpetually dynamic, society would result. The episode ends with the suggestion that this mathematically modelled society is run on data—performance targets, quotas, statistics—and these figures, combined with the exaggerated belief in human selfishness, have created "a cage" for Western humans. The precise nature of the "cage" is to be discussed in part two.

==== Contributors ====
- John Nash, 1994 winner of the Nobel Memorial Prize in Economic Sciences
- Friedrich von Hayek, Nobel-winning economist and political philosopher
- James M. Buchanan, Nobel-winning economist famous for his work on public choice theory
- Professor Thomas Schelling, Nobel-winning economist and game theorist
- Robert Kavesh, government economist, 1950s
- Philip Mirowski, historian and philosopher of economics and politics
- Alain Enthoven, nuclear strategist at RAND Corporation, 1956–60
- R. D. Laing, psychiatrist
- Morton Schatzman, psychiatrist and colleague of R. D. Laing
- Clancy Sigal, colleague of R. D. Laing
- Madsen Pirie, founder of the Adam Smith Institute
- Sir Antony Jay, co-author of BBC comedy series Yes Minister
- David Rosenhan, attendee of R. D. Laing's talks in the US; creator of the Rosenhan experiment
- Paul McHugh, psychiatrist-in-chief at Johns Hopkins Hospital
- Robert Spitzer, chair of the DSM-III task force
- Jerome Wakefield, psychiatrist

=== Part 2. "The Lonely Robot" ===
Part two reiterated many of the ideas of the first part, but developed the theme that drugs such as Prozac and lists of psychological symptoms which might indicate anxiety or depression were being used to normalise behaviour and make humans behave more predictably, like machines. This was not presented as a conspiracy theory, but as a logical (although unpredicted) outcome of market-driven self-diagnosis by check-list based on symptoms, but not actual causes, discussed in part one. People with standard mood fluctuations diagnosed themselves as abnormal. They then presented themselves at psychiatrist's offices, fulfilled the diagnostic criteria without offering personal histories, and were medicated. The alleged result is that vast numbers of Western people have had their behaviour and mental activity modified by SSRIs without any strict medical necessity.

The episode showed a clip of a fight in a Yanomami village from the film The Ax Fight by Napoleon Chagnon and Tim Asch. According to Chagnon the fight is an example of the impact of kin selection on humans, since the people fighting chose sides on the basis of kinship. Curtis interviews Chagnon and puts to him the assertion of fellow anthropologist Brian Ferguson that much of the Yanamamo violence, particularly its intensity, was very strongly influenced by the presence of Westerners handing out goods which the tribesmen fought over; in this case the goods were highly prized and useful machetes. Chagnon, however, insists that his presence had had no influence whatsoever on the situation, citing the fact that similar fights happened when he wasn't present, which he also documented through informants. Curtis asked, "You don't think a film crew in the middle of a fight in a village has an effect?" Chagnon replied, "No, I don't", and immediately stopped the interview.

Footage of Richard Dawkins propounding his gene-centered view of evolution is shown, with archive clips spanning two decades to emphasise how the severely reductionist ideas of programmed behaviour have slowly been absorbed by mainstream culture. (Later, however, the documentary gives evidence that cells are able to selectively replicate parts of DNA dependent on current needs. According to Curtis, such evidence detracts from the simplified economic models of human beings.) This brings Curtis back to the economic models of Hayek and the game theories of the Cold War. Curtis explains how, with the "robotic" description of mankind apparently validated by geneticists, the game theory systems gained even more currency with society's engineers. The programme describes how the Clinton administration gave in to market theorists in the US and how New Labour in the UK decided to measure everything it could by introducing such arbitrary and unmeasurable targets as:

- Reduction of hunger in Sub-Saharan Africa by 48%
- Reduction of global conflict by 6%

It introduced a rural community vibrancy index in order to gauge the quality of life in Britain's villages and a birdsong index to measure the apparent decline of wildlife. In industry and public services, this way of thinking led to a plethora of targets, quotas and plans. It was meant to set workers free to achieve these targets in any way they chose. What the government did not realise was that the players, faced with impossible demands, would cheat. Curtis describes how, in order to meet arbitrary targets:

- Lothian and Borders Police reclassified dozens of criminal offences as "suspicious occurrences" in order to keep them out of crime figures;
- Some NHS hospital trusts created the unofficial post of "The Hello Nurse," whose sole task it was to greet new arrivals in order to claim for statistical purposes that the patient had been "seen", even though no treatment or examination took place during the encounter;
- NHS managers took the wheels off trolleys and reclassified them as beds, while simultaneously reclassifying corridors as wards, in order to falsify Accident & Emergency waiting times statistics.

In a section called "The Death of Social Mobility", Curtis describes how the theory of the free market was applied to education. In the UK, the introduction of school performance league tables was intended to give individual schools more power and autonomy, to enable them to compete for pupils, the theory being that it would motivate the worst-performing schools to improve; it was an attempt to move away from the rigid state control that had offered little choice to parents while failing to improve educational standards, and towards a culture of free choice and incentivisation, without going as far as privatising the schools.

Following publication of the school league tables, wealthier parents moved into the catchment areas of the best schools, causing house prices in those areas to rise dramatically—ensuring that poor children were left with the worst-performing schools. This is just one aspect of a more rigidly stratified society which Curtis identifies in the way in which the incomes of working class Americans have actually fallen in real terms since the 1970s, while the incomes of the middle class have increased slightly, and those of the highest one percent of earners (the upper class) have quadrupled. Similarly, babies in the poorest areas in the UK are twice as likely to die in their first year as children from prosperous areas. Curtis ends part two with the observation that game theory and the free market model is now undergoing interrogation by economists who suspect a more irrational model of behaviour is appropriate and useful. In fact, in formal experiments the only people who behaved exactly according to the mathematical models created by game theory are economists themselves, and psychopaths.

==== Contributors ====
- James M. Buchanan, winner of the Economics Prize for public choice theory
- Philip Mirowski, historian and philosopher of economics and politics
- Robert Rubin, economic adviser to Clinton
- Robert Reich, Secretary of Labor under Clinton (1993–1997)
- Thomas Frank, political journalist
- John Maynard Smith, geneticist (speaking in 1976)
- Napoleon Chagnon, anthropologist (filmed The Ax Fight in 1975)
- Richard Dawkins, popularizer of genetics (speaking in 1987)
- Paul McHugh, psychiatrist-in-chief of Johns Hopkins Hospital
- Robert Spitzer, chair of the DSM-III task force
- Jerome Wakefield, psychiatrist
- Arthur Levitt, SEC Chair under Clinton (1993–2001)
- Itzhak Sharav, accounting professor
- Kevin Phillips, political analyst
- Brian Ferguson, anthropologist
- John Nash, winner of the Economics Prize for game theory

=== Part 3. "We Will Force You to Be Free" ===
Archive interview with Isaiah Berlin

The final part focusses on the concepts of positive and negative liberty first described in the 1950s by Isaiah Berlin. Curtis briefly explains how negative liberty could be defined as freedom from coercion and positive liberty as the opportunity to strive to fulfill one's potential. Tony Blair had read Berlin's essays on the topic and wrote to him in the late 1990s, arguing that positive and negative liberty could be mutually compatible. As Berlin was on his deathbed at the time, Blair never got a reply.

The programme begins with a description of the Two Concepts of Liberty and Berlin's opinion that, since it lacked coercion, negative liberty was the safest of the two concepts. Curtis then explains how many political groups that sought their vision of freedom ended up using violence to achieve it. For example, the French revolutionaries wished to overthrow a monarchical system which they viewed as antithetical to freedom, but in doing so they ended up with the Reign of Terror. Similarly, the Bolshevik revolutionaries in Russia, who sought to overthrow the established order and replace it with a society in which everyone is equal, ended up creating a totalitarian regime which used violence to achieve its objectives.

Using violence, not simply as a means to achieve one's goals, but also as an expression of freedom from Western bourgeois norms, was an idea developed by Afro-Caribbean revolutionary Frantz Fanon. He developed it from the existentialist ideology of Jean-Paul Sartre, who argued that terrorism was a "terrible weapon, but the oppressed poor have no others." These views were expressed, for example, in the revolutionary film The Battle of Algiers. This part also explores how economic freedom had been introduced in Russia through a series of problematic experiments. A set of policies known as "shock therapy" (also described in the 2007 book The Shock Doctrine by Naomi Klein) were brought in mainly by outsiders, with the effect of destroying the social safety net. Sudden removal of subsidies caused hyperinflation, and economic crisis escalated during the 1990s until some people were being paid in goods rather than money. The Russian parliament attempted to revolt, to which then-president Boris Yeltsin responded with military force, subsequently removing parliament's power in favour of autocracy.

State-owned industries were sold to private businesses, often at a fraction of their real value. Ordinary people, often in financial difficulties, would sell shares, which to them were worthless, for cash, without appreciating their true value. This culminated with the rise of the "Oligarchs"—super-rich businessmen who attributed their rise to the sell-offs of the 90s. It resulted in a polarisation of society into the poor and ultra-rich, and increasing autocracy under Vladimir Putin, with promises to provide dignity and basic living requirements. There is a similar review of post-war Iraq, in which an even more extreme "shock therapy" was employed—the removal from government of all Ba'ath party employees and the introduction of economic models following the simplified economic model of human beings outlined in the first two parts—this resulted in the immediate disintegration of Iraqi society and the rise of two strongly autocratic insurgencies: one based on Sunni-Ba'athist ideals and another based on revolutionary Shi'a philosophies.

Curtis looks at the neoconservative agenda of the 1980s. Like Sartre, they argued that violence is sometimes necessary to achieve their goals, except they wished to spread what they described as democracy. Curtis quotes General Alexander Haig, then-US Secretary of State, as saying that, "Some things were worth fighting for." However, Curtis argues, although the version of society espoused by the neoconservatives made some concessions towards freedom, it did not offer true freedom. Although the neoconservatives, for example, forced the Augusto Pinochet regime in Chile and the Ferdinand Marcos regime in the Philippines to hold democratic elections, these transformations to democracy essentially replaced one elite with another, and the gap between those who have power and wealth, and those who have neither, remained; the freedom the change provided was therefore relatively narrow in concept.

The neoconservatives wanted to change or overthrow the Sandinistas—a socialist group in Nicaragua—who were seen as tyrannical, destabilising, and a threat to US security; the US therefore supported anti-communist rebels known collectively as the Contras, who, Curtis states, carried out many violations of human rights, including the torture and murder of civilians. US Government financial support to the Contras had been banned by the US Congress, so other means were used to continue financing them, including the CIA allegedly providing aircraft for the rebels to fly cocaine into the United States, as well as the Iran–Contra affair in which the US illegally supplied weapons to the Iranian government, originally in exchange for assistance to gain the release of US prisoners in Lebanon, but also allegedly for cash which was then given to the Contras. Curtis uses this as another example of how the neoconservatives had fallen into the trap that Berlin had predicted: although they wanted to spread negative freedom, because they saw their ideology as an absolute truth they were able to justify using coercion and lies and also to support violence in order to perpetuate it.

Such policies did not always result in the achievement of neoconservative aims and occasionally threw up genuine surprises. Curtis examines the Western-backed government of the Shah in Iran, and how the mixing of Sartre's positive libertarian ideals with Shia religious philosophy led to the revolution which overthrew it. Having previously been a meek philosophy of acceptance of the social order, in the minds of revolutionaries such as Ali Shariati and Ayatollah Khomeini, Revolutionary Shia Islam became a meaningful force to overthrow tyranny. The programme examines the government of Tony Blair and its role in achieving its vision of a stable society. In fact, argues Curtis, the Blair government had created the opposite of freedom, in that the type of liberty it had engendered wholly lacked any kind of meaning. Its military intervention in Iraq had provoked terrorist actions in the UK and these terrorist actions were in turn used to justify restrictions on liberty.

In essence, the programme suggests that following the path of negative liberty to its logical conclusions, as governments have done in the West for the past 50 years, results in a society without meaning populated only by selfish automatons, and that there was some value in positive liberty in that it allowed people to strive to better themselves. The closing minutes directly state that if Western humans are ever to find their way out of the "trap" described in the series, they would have to realise that Isaiah Berlin was wrong, and that not all attempts to change the world for the better necessarily lead to tyranny.

==== Contributors ====
- Isaiah Berlin, political philosopher
- Kenneth Clark, historian, presenter of BBC TV series Civilisation
- Malcolm Muggeridge, British journalist
- Stuart Hall, cultural historian
- Jean-Paul Sartre, existentialist philosopher
- Frantz Fanon, psychoanalyst, revolutionary
- Jim Howard, field director, OXFAM
- Michael Ledeen, advocate of US regime change policy
- Alexander Haig, first US Secretary of State under Ronald Reagan
- Samuel P. Huntington, US political scientist
- Elliott Abrams, Assistant US Secretary of State 1981–1989
- Robert Parry, Press Association reporter in Nicaragua in the 1980s
- Francis Fukuyama, political philosopher
- Jeffrey Sachs, US economist
- Yevgeny Kiselyov, general director of NTV, Russian TV station

== Reception ==
Economist Max Steuer criticised the documentary for "romanticis[ing] the past while misrepresenting the ideas it purports to explain"; for example, Curtis suggests that the work of Buchanan and others on public choice theory made government officials wicked and selfish, rather than simply providing an account of what happened. In the New Statesman, Rachel Cooke argued that the series doesn't make a coherent argument. She said that while she was glad Adam Curtis made provocative documentaries, he was as much of a propagandist as those he opposes.

While commending the series, Radio Times stated that The Trap's subject matter was not ideal for its 21:00 Sunday timeslot on the minority BBC Two. This placed The Trap against Castaway 2007 on BBC One, the drama Fallen Angel, the first two episodes in a series of high-profile Jane Austen adaptations on ITV1, and the sixth season of 24 on Sky One. The series had a consistent share of the viewing audience throughout its original run:

1. "F**k You Buddy" (11 March 2007): ~ 1.4 million viewers; 6% audience share
2. "The Lonely Robot" (18 March 2007): ~ 1.3 million viewers; 6% audience share
3. "We Will Force You to Be Free" (25 March 2007) ~ 1.3 million viewers; 6% audience share

== Featured music ==
- "The Godfathers at Home" from The Godfather Part II soundtrack (opening title)
- "Intermezzo" from The Karelia Suite by Jean Sibelius (opening title, episode one; also in episode three)
- Soundtrack to The Marseille Contract (MC/M11) Roy Budd
- "Return to Hot Chicken", from the album I Can Hear the Heart Beating as One by Yo La Tengo
- "Nowhere Near" from the album Painful by Yo La Tengo
- "On Some Faraway Beach", from the album Here Come the Warm Jets by Brian Eno
- "Age of Consent", from the album Power, Corruption & Lies by New Order
- "Assault on Precinct 13 (Main Title)" from the Assault on Precinct 13 soundtrack by John Carpenter
- "Scene d'Amour", "Interlude", "The Reunion", "The Match Box" and other movements from the Vertigo and North by Northwest scores by Bernard Herrmann
- "Cosmonaute" from the album Monokini by Stereo Total
- "Is That All There Is?" by Peggy Lee
- "Becalmed" from the album Another Green World by Brian Eno
- "Taking Tiger Mountain" from Taking Tiger Mountain by Strategy by Brian Eno
- "The Thing (Main Title)" from The Thing score by Ennio Morricone
- "Profondamente, Nel Mostro – Part 1" from Il Mostro score by Ennio Morricone, used near the end of the first and the third (Yeltsin part) episode.
- "Contest Winners" from the Carrie score by Pino Donaggio
- "Great Release" from LCD Soundsystem by LCD Soundsystem
- "La Marseillaise" (end credits, episode three)
- The Gadfly, Op. 97 "Romance" by Dmitri Shostakovich
- "Theme from Starman" (1984 film by John Carpenter) by Jack Nitzsche
- "Aquarium" from Le carnaval des animaux by Camille Saint-Saëns
- "Theme from Tragedy of a Ridiculous Man" (1981 film by Bernardo Bertolucci) by Ennio Morricone
- "Allegro molto vivace" from Symphony No. 2 by Charles Ives

From the motion picture Carrie: "For the Last Time We'll Pray" by Pino Donaggio.
