= Magical Death =

- Directed by: Napoleon Chagnon and Tim Asch
- Distributed by: Documentary Educational Resources
- Release date: 1973
- Running time: 29 min.
- Country: United States
- Language: English

Magical Death is a documentary film by anthropologist Napoleon Chagnon, that explores the role of the shaman within the Yanomamo culture, the film also examines the close relationship shamanism shares with politics within their society.

Chagnon and frequent collaborator Tim Asch allegedly disagreed over the content of the film, when Asch objected to its graphic depictions of the Yanomami, engaging in symbolic death and cannibalism.

The film was awarded the American Film Festival Blue Ribbon.

== See also ==
- The Ax Fight
- Yanomamö: The Fierce People
