= Rural community vibrancy index =

The Rural Community Vibrancy Index is a statistical measure designed by the British Government's Countryside Agency (1999–2006) which is meant to measure the potential for, or reality of, community participation in rural settlements.

Assessment includes features such as pubs, village halls, public transport, childcare facilities and schools.

Towns and villages can score a maximum of 14 points on the index. A score of less than four points means that a community has poor community vibrancy, a score of five to eight points is "positive" and a score of nine or above means a community has "extensive" vibrancy.

The index was criticised in the 2007 documentary series The Trap.
