= Multimodal anthropology =

Anthropology in multiple media forms

Multimodal anthropology is an emerging subfield of social cultural anthropology that encompasses anthropological research and knowledge production across multiple traditional and new media platforms and practices including film, video, photography, theatre, design, podcast, mobile apps, interactive games, web-based social networking, immersive 360 video and augmented reality. As characterized in American Anthropologist, multimodal anthropology is an "anthropology that works across multiple media, but one that also engages in public anthropology and collaborative anthropology through a field of differentially linked media platforms" (Collins, Durington & Gill). A multimodal approach also encourages anthropologists to reconsider the ways in which they conduct their research, to pay close attention to the role various media technologies and digital devices plays in the lives of their interlocutors, and how they these technologies redefine what fieldwork looks like. Scholars Collins, Durington, and Gill call it "anthropology that works across multiple media." It's not just about doing research alone; it's also about working with others and looking at how we do research in new ways, as well as an 'embodied practice', according to Varvantakis and Nolas. Multimodal anthropology has been growing since the early days of anthropology, changing along with new technology. It's not just about pictures anymore; now it includes things like podcasts, interactive designs, and even storytelling. Collins, Durington, and Gill say that multimodal anthropology adds to visual anthropology instead of replacing it, recognizing how media keeps evolving. Journals like "entanglements: experiments in multimodal ethnography," led by Nolas and Varvantakis, show a strong dedication to exploring all the different sides of multimodal research, encouraging scholars to think differently and embrace the rich experiences of studying people and cultures.

== History and background ==
Multimodal anthropology is not a new concept. It has been a fundamental part of anthropological research and fieldwork from the early days of the discipline. Anthropologists have been experimenting with different forms media technologies throughout the twentieth century whenever confronted with the limitation of text-based ethnography. Multimodal is a term that has readily been used since the 1970s in varied disciplines as psychotherapy, phonetics, genetics, literature and medicine to characterize different approaches to carrying out scientific research that involves to a certain degree, thinking outside of the box. In the early 1990s, semioticians used the terms to discuss different forms of communication across different media, eventually including digital media.

Technological advances in the later part of the twentieth century, the accessibility to photography, film cameras and audio recorders led to the emergence of visual anthropology as a sub discipline dedicated to the study and production of ethnographic photography, film and media. Building in this legacy, multimodal anthropology seeks to expand the boundaries of visual anthropology to incorporate emerging technologies of twenty-first century including mobile networking, social media, geo-mapping, virtual reality, podcasting, interactive design, along with other traditional forms of learning and knowledge production like art and drawing that were often sidelined within visual anthropology, such as interactive gaming, theatre, performance, graphic novels, ethnofiction and experimental ethnography. As Samuel Collins, Matthew Durington and Harjant Gill note in their introductory essay "Multimodality: An Invitation", published in American Anthropologist, "multimodal anthropologies does not attempt – or desire – to supplant visual anthropology. Rather it seeks to include traditional forms of visual anthropology while simultaneously broadening the purview of the discipline to engage in variety of media forms that exist today."

In 2018 the journal entanglements: experiments in multimodal ethnography was first published, aiming to explore and advance the subfield. The journal is online and open access and is co-edited by Melissa Nolas and Christos Varvantakis. In the inaugural editorial the editors stated that "we aim to engage with some of the challenges and questions that contemporary multimodal ethnographic practice throws up: What knowledge do multimodal and multimedia encounters generate? What languages are available to researchers to describe the coming together of different modes and media? What are the everyday practices involved in such convergences and divergences? How might these encounters themselves be described?" Furthermore, "research is often an attempt to disentangle everyday experiences, those of our interlocutors as well as our encounters with them, and multimodality is no exception here. The analytical approaches of the social sciences tend towards the creation of order out of complexity asking us to categorise and organise our experiences and data into issues, themes, narratives and discourses. The messy actuality of practice, with its sensory dimensions and emotional hues, is often lost in this process (Ingold 2011). What if a different logic guided our analytical and practice endeavours?"
