= Napoleon Chagnon =

American cultural anthropologist (1938–2019)

- Born: Napoleon Alphonseau Chagnon; 27 August 1938; Port Austin, Michigan, U.S.
- Died: 21 September 2019 (aged 81); Traverse City, Michigan, U.S.
- Education: University of Michigan (BA, MA, PhD)
- Known for: Reproductive theory of violence, ethnography of Yanomamö
- Scientific career
- Fields: Sociocultural anthropology
- Workplaces: University of Michigan; Pennsylvania State University; Northwestern University; UC-Santa Barbara; University of Missouri
- Thesis: Yanomamö Warfare, Social Organization and Marriage Alliances (1966)
- Doctoral advisor: Leslie White

Napoleon Alphonseau Chagnon (27 August 1938 – 21 September 2019) was an American cultural anthropologist, professor of sociocultural anthropology at the University of Missouri in Columbia and member of the National Academy of Sciences. Chagnon was known for his long-term ethnographic field work among the Yanomamö/Yanomami, a society of Indigenous tribal Amazonians, in which he used an evolutionary approach to understand social behavior in terms of genetic relatedness. His work centered on the analysis of violence among tribal peoples, and, using socio-biological analyses, he advanced the argument that violence among the Yanomami is fueled by an evolutionary process in which successful warriors have more offspring. His 1967 ethnography Yanomamö: The Fierce People became a bestseller and is frequently assigned in introductory anthropology courses.

Admirers described him as a pioneer of scientific anthropology. In 2013, Chagnon was called the "most controversial anthropologist" in the United States in a New York Times Magazine profile preceding the publication of Chagnon's final book, a memoir titled Noble Savages: My Life Among Two Dangerous Tribes—the Yanomamö and the Anthropologists.

== Early life and education ==
Chagnon was born in Port Austin, Michigan, and was the second of twelve children. After enrolling at the Michigan College of Mining and Technology in 1957, he transferred to the University of Michigan after his first year and there received a bachelor's degree in 1961, an M.A. in 1963, and a Ph.D. in 1966 under the tutelage of Leslie White. Based on seventeen months of fieldwork begun in 1964, Chagnon's thesis examined the relationship between kinship and the social organization of Yanomamö villages.

== Career ==
Chagnon was best known for his long-term ethnographic field work among the Yanomamö, indigenous Amazonians who live in the border area between Venezuela and Brazil. Working primarily in the headwaters of the upper Siapa and upper Mavaca Rivers in Venezuela, he conducted fieldwork from the mid-1960s until the latter half of the 1990s. According to Chagnon, when he arrived he realised that the theories he had been taught during his training had shortcomings, because – contrary to what they predicted – raiding and fighting, often over women, was endemic. His habit of constantly asking them questions earned Chagnon the Yanomamö nickname "pesky bee." A major focus of his research was the collection of genealogies of the residents of the villages he visited, and from these he would analyze patterns of relatedness, marriage patterns, cooperation, and settlement pattern histories. The degree of kinship was seen by Chagnon as important for the forming of alliances in social interactions, including conflict.

Chagnon's methods of analysis are widely seen as having been influenced by sociobiology. As Chagnon described it, Yanomamö society produced fierceness, because that behavior furthered male reproductive success. The genealogies showed that men who killed had more wives and children than men who did not kill. At the level of the villages, the war-like populations expanded at the expense of their neighbors. Chagnon's positing of a link between reproductive success and violence cast doubt on the sociocultural perspective that cultures are constructed from human experience. An enduring controversy over Chagnon's work has been described as a microcosm of the conflict between biological and sociocultural anthropology.

Chagnon's ethnography, Yanomamö: The Fierce People, was published in 1968 and ran to several editions, selling nearly a million copies. It is commonly used as a text in university-level introductory anthropology classes, making it one of the bestselling anthropological texts of all time. Chagnon was also a pioneer in the field of visual anthropology. He collaborated with ethnographic filmmaker Tim Asch and produced a series of more than twenty ethnographic films documenting Yanomamö life. The ethnographic film The Ax Fight, showing a fight among two Yanomami groups and analyzing it as it relates to kinship networks, is considered a classic in ethnographic film making.

In 2012 he was elected to the National Academy of Sciences. Marshall Sahlins, who was a major critic of Chagnon, resigned from the academy, citing Chagnon's induction as one of the reasons he quit.

On 21 September 2019, Chagnon died at the age of 81.

== Controversies ==
=== Darkness in El Dorado ===
In 2000, Patrick Tierney, in his book Darkness in El Dorado, accused Chagnon and his colleague James V. Neel of unethical behavior, such as, among other things, manipulating data, and exacerbating a measles epidemic among the Yanomamö people.

Most of the allegations made in Darkness in El Dorado were publicly rejected by the Provost's office of the University of Michigan in November 2000. For example, the interviews upon which the book was based all came from members of the Salesians of Don Bosco, a congregation of the Catholic Church, which Chagnon had criticized and angered.

The American Anthropological Association convened a task force in February 2001 to investigate some of the allegations made in Tierney's book. Their report, which was issued by the AAA in May 2002, held that Chagnon had both represented the Yanomamö in harmful ways and failed in some instances to obtain proper consent from both the government and the groups he studied. However, the Task Force stated that there was no support for the claim that Chagnon and Neel began a measles epidemic. In June 2005, however, the AAA voted two-to-one to rescind the acceptance of the 2002 report.

Alice Dreger, a historian of medicine and science, concluded after a year's research that Tierney's claims were false and the American Anthropological Association was complicit and irresponsible in helping spread these falsehoods and not protecting "scholars from baseless and sensationalistic charges".

The controversy is covered in the 2005 book Yanomami: The Fierce Controversy and What We Can Learn from It by anthropologist Robert Borofsky.

=== Anthropological critiques of his work ===
Chagnon's work with the Yanomamö was widely criticized by other anthropologists. Anthropologists critiqued both aspects of his research methods as well as the theoretical approach, and the interpretations and conclusions he drew from his data. Most controversial was his claim that Yanomamö society is particularly violent, and his claim that this feature of their culture is grounded in biological differences that are the result of natural selection.

The anthropologist Brian Ferguson argued that Yanomamö culture is not particularly violent, and that the violence that does exist is largely a result of socio-political reconfigurations of their society under the influence of colonization. Bruce Albert rejected the statistical basis for his claims that more violent Yanomamö men have more children. Others questioned the ethics inherent in painting an ethnic group as violent, pointing out that Chagnon's depiction of the Yanomamö as such breaks with anthropology's traditional ethics of trying to describe foreign societies sympathetically, and argued that his depictions resulted in increased hostility and racism against the Yanomamö by settlers and colonists in the area. Emily Eakin countered that Albert "cannot demonstrate a direct connection between Chagnon's writings and the government's Indian policy" and that the idea that scientists should suppress unflattering information about their subjects is troubling and supports the idea that nonviolence is a prerequisite for protecting the Yanomamö.

The anthropologist Marshall Sahlins, one of Chagnon's graduate teachers, criticized Chagnon's methods, pointing out that Chagnon acknowledged engaging in behavior that was disagreeable to his informants by not participating in food-sharing obligations. Sahlins claimed that Chagnon's trade of steel weaponry for blood samples and genealogical information amounted to "participant-instigation" which encouraged economic competition and violence. Lastly, Sahlins argued that Chagnon's publications, which contend that violent Yanomamö men are conferred with reproductive advantages, made false assumptions in designating killers and omit other variables that explain reproductive success. In 2013, Sahlins resigned from the National Academy of Sciences, in part in protest of Chagnon's election to the body. Other researchers of the Yanomamö such as Brian Ferguson argued that Chagnon himself contributed to escalating violence among the Yanomamö by offering machetes, axes, and shotguns to selected groups to elicit their cooperation. Chagnon said that it was instead local Salesian priests who were supplying guns to the Yanomamö, who then used them to kill each other.

In his autobiography, Chagnon stated that most criticisms of his work were based on a postmodern and antiscientific ideology that arose within anthropology, in which careful study of isolated tribes was replaced in many cases by explicit political advocacy that denied less pleasant aspects of the Yanomamö culture, such as warfare, domestic violence, and infanticide. Chagnon stated that much of his work has undermined the idea of the 'Noble savage' – a romanticized stereotype of indigenous people living in synchrony with nature and uncorrupted by modern civilization. Chagnon also stated that his beliefs about sociobiology and kin selection were misinterpreted and misunderstood, similarly because of a rejection of scientific and biological explanations for culture within anthropology.

As a result of the controversy and the alleged unethical practices with the Yanomami, Chagnon was officially barred from studying the Yanomami and from reentering their country in Venezuela.

== Written works ==
=== Books ===
- Chagnon, Napoleon A. (1968), Yanomamö: The Fierce People.
- Chagnon, Napoleon A. (1974), Studying the Yanomamö, New York: Holt, Rinehart & Winston.
- Chagnon, Napoleon A. (1992), Yanomamö – The Last Days of Eden.
- Chagnon, Napoleon A.; Cronk, Lee; Irons, William (2002), Adaptation and Human Behavior: An Anthropological Perspective.
- Chagnon, Napoleon A. (2013). Noble Savages: My Life Among Two Dangerous Tribes – The Yanomamö and the Anthropologists. New York: Simon and Schuster. ISBN 978-0684855110.

=== Book chapters ===
- Chagnon, Napoleon A. (1986), "Yanomamö social organization and aggression", in Fried, M. (ed.), War; the Anthropology of Armed Conflict and Aggression, New York: Garden City
- Chagnon, Napoleon A. (1995), "Chronic Problems in Understanding Tribal Violence and Warfare", in Willey & Chichester (ed.), Genetics of Criminal and Antisocial Behavior, Ciba Foundation Symposium
- Chagnon, Napoleon A. (1972), "Tribal social organization and genetic microdifferentiation", in Harrison, A.; Boyce, A (eds.), Structure of human populations, Oxford
- Chagnon, Napoleon A. (1973), "Daily life among the Yanomamö", in Romney, A. K.; Devore, P. L. (eds.), You and others, Cambridge
- Chagnon, Napoleon A. (1973), "Yanomamö social organization and warfare", in Fried, M. (ed.), Explorations in Anthropology, New York: Crowell
- Chagnon, Napoleon A. (1973), "The culture-ecology of shifting (pioneering) cultivation among the Yanomamö Indians", in Gross, D. R. (ed.), International Congress of Anthropological and Ethnological Sciences, New York: Garden City
- Chagnon, Napoleon A. (1977), "Yanomamö – the fierce people", in Gould, R. (ed.), Man's many ways, New York: Harper & Row
- Chagnon, Napoleon A. (1977), "Yanomamö warfare", in Coppenhaver, D. (ed.), Anthropology full circle, New York: Prager
- Chagnon, Napoleon A. (1979), "Is Reproductive Success Equal in Egalitarian Societies?", in Chagnon, N.; Irons, W. (eds.), Evolutionary Biology and Human Social Behavior, North Scituate: Duxbury
- Chagnon, Napoleon A. (1979), "Mate Competition, Favoring Close kin, and Village Fissioning Among the Yanomamö Indians", in Chagnon, N.; Irons, W. (eds.), Evolutionary biology and human social behavior, North Scituate: Duxbury
- Chagnon, Napoleon A. (1982), "Anthropology and the Nature of Things", in Wiegele, T. (ed.), Biology and the Social Sciences, Boulder: Westview
- Chagnon, Napoleon A. (1982), "Sociodemographic Attributes of Nepotism in Tribal Populations: Man the Rule-Breaker", in KSCS Group (ed.), Current problems in sociobiology, New York: Cambridge University Press
- Chagnon, Napoleon A.; Ayers, M.; Neel, J. V.; Weitkamp, L.; Gershowitz, H. (1975), "The influence of cultural factors on the demography and pattern of gene flow from the Makiritare to the Yanomama indians", in Hulse, F. S. (ed.), Man and nature: studies in the evolution of the human species, New York: Random House
- Chagnon, Napoleon A.; Bugos, P. E. (1979), "Kin selection and conflict: an analysis of a Yanomamö ax fight", in Chagnon, Napoleon A.; Irons, W. (eds.), Evolutionary biology and human social behavior, North Scituate: Duxbury Press
- Chagnon, Napoleon A.; Flinn, M. V.; Melancon, T. F. (1979), "Sex-ratio variation among the Yanomamö Indians", in Chagnon, Napoleon; Irons, W. (eds.), Evolutionary Biology and Human Social Behavior, North Scituate: Duxbury Press

=== Journal articles ===
- Chagnon, Napoleon A. (1967a), "Yanomamo – the fierce people", Natural History, vol. LXXVII, pp. 22–31
- Chagnon, Napoleon A. (1967b), "Yanomamö Social Organization and Warfare", Natural History, vol. LXXVI, pp. 44–48
- Chagnon, Napoleon A. (1968a), "The Culture-Ecology of Shifting (Pioneering) Cultivation Among The Yanomamö Indians", International Congress of Anthropological and Ethnological Sciences, vol. 3, pp. 249–255
- Chagnon, Napoleon A. (1968b), "The feast", Natural History, vol. LXXVII, pp. 34–41
- Chagnon, Napoleon A. (1970), "Ecological and Adaptive Aspects of California Shell Money", Annual Report of the UCLA Archaeological Survey, vol. 12, pp. 1–25
- Chagnon, Napoleon A. (1973), "The culture-ecology of shifting (pioneering) cultivation among the Yanomamö Indians", in Gross, D. R. (ed.), International Congress of Anthropological and Ethnological Sciences, New York: Garden City
- Chagnon, Napoleon A. (1975), "Genealogy, Solidarity and Relatedness: Limits to Local Group Size and Patterns of Fissioning in an Expanding Population", Yearbook of Physical Anthropology, vol. 19, pp. 95–110
- Chagnon, Napoleon A. (1976), "Yanomamö, the true people", National Geographic Magazine, vol. 150, pp. 210–223
- Chagnon, Napoleon A. (1980), "Highland New Guinea models in the South American lowlands", Working Papers on South American Indians, vol. 2, pp. 111–130
- Chagnon, Napoleon A. (1981), "Doing fieldwork among the Yanomamö", Contemporary Anthropology, pp. 11–24
- Chagnon, Napoleon A. (1988), "Life Histories, Blood Revenge, and Warfare in a Tribal Population", Science, vol. 239, no. 4843, pp. 985–992, Bibcode:1988Sci...239..985C, CiteSeerX 10.1.1.217.1160, doi:10.1126/science.239.4843.985, PMID 17815700, S2CID 14297757
- Chagnon, Napoleon A. (1989), "Yanomamö survival", Science, vol. 244, no. 4900, p. 11, Bibcode:1989Sci...244...11C, doi:10.1126/science.244.4900.11, PMID 17818827
- Chagnon, Napoleon A. (1990), "On Yanomamö violence: reply to Albert", Current Anthropology, vol. 31, pp. 49–53, doi:10.1086/203802, S2CID 144894980
- Chagnon, Napoleon A.; Ayres, M.; Neel, J. V.; Weitkamp, L.; Gershowitz, H. (1970), "The influence of cultural factors on the demography and pattern of gene flow from the Makiritare to the Yanomama indians" (PDF), American Journal of Physical Anthropology, vol. 32, no. 3, pp. 339–349, Bibcode:1970AJPA...32..339C, doi:10.1002/ajpa.1330320304, hdl:2027.42/37501, PMID 5419372
- Chagnon, Napoleon A.; Hames, R. B. (1979), "Protein Deficiency and Tribal Warfare in Amazonia: New Data", Science, vol. 203, no. 4383, pp. 910–913, Bibcode:1979Sci...203..910C, doi:10.1126/science.570302, PMID 570302
- Chagnon, Napoleon A.; Le Quesne, P.; Cook, J. M. (1971), "Yanomamö Hallucinogens: Anthropological, Botanical, and Chemical Findings", Current Anthropology, vol. 12, pp. 72–74, doi:10.1086/201170, S2CID 144661874
- Chagnon, Napoleon A.; Margolies, L.; Gasparini, G.; Hames, R. B. (1982–83), "Parentesco, demografía, patrones de inversión de los padres y el uso social del espacio arquitectónico entre los Shamatari-Yanomamö del TF Amazonas: informe preliminar", Boletín Indigenista Venezolano (in Spanish), vol. 21, VZ, pp. 171–225

== Film ==
Chagnon worked with ethnographic filmmaker Tim Asch to produce at least forty films on Yanomamo culture, including The Feast (1969), Magical Death (1973) and The Ax Fight (1975). These films, especially The Ax Fight, are widely used in anthropological and visual culture curriculum and are considered to be among the most important ethnographic films ever produced.

== See also ==
- Visual anthropology
- The Trap (television documentary series); Chagnon features in The Trap, a BBC documentary.
