= The Ax Fight =

1975 film

The Ax Fight (1975) is an ethnographic film by anthropologist and filmmaker Tim Asch and anthropologist Napoleon Chagnon about a conflict in a Yanomami village called Mishimishimabowei-teri, in southern Venezuela. It is best known as an iconic and idiosyncratic ethnographic film about the Yanomamo and is frequently shown in classroom settings.

== Summary ==
The film has four parts and operates on a number of analytical levels. It opens with a map of the region where the village is located and then proceeds to about ten minutes of virtually unedited film footage of combat among multiple participants armed with clubs, machetes, and axes. This 11-minute sequence represents all that was shot of the fight, which lasted about twenty minutes. Many of the shots and accompanying audio reflect the surprise of the Western film crew and their ignorance about the cause of the fight until some time later.

The fight, which occurred on the second day of Asch and Chagnon's arrival to the village on February 28, 1971, is presented to the viewer as it was experienced by the anthropologist and filmmaker, as chaotic and unstructured violence. The second part of the Ax Fight, however, replays the events in slow motion while Chagnon explains who the combatants are and describes their relationship to one another. Although they initially believe the fight occurred because of an incestuous relationship, the anthropologists learn that this is not the case and that the fight is the latest manifestation of long-standing hostility between a faction that lives in the village and a faction that is among a party of visitors. The fight is explained as "a ritualized contest, not a brawl" in which combatants make a relatively orderly progression from less lethal weapons to more lethal ones and people choose sides in the dispute on the basis of kinship obligations and shared histories. Eventually, elders (who tend to have conflicting loyalties) step in to help end the conflict.

The third part of the film uses a number of kinship diagrams to further elaborate on these family bonds and explains how kinship and political systems are often interchangeable in Yanomamo life.

The final part of the film replays an edited version of the fight, intended to illustrate the effect that the process of editing has on the construction of anthropological knowledge.

== Controversy ==
Although Chagnon and Asch had worked on more than a dozen documentaries together, their relationship was ended by The Ax Fight's release because they disagreed on who should receive top billing in the film credits.

In 2007, The Ax Fight was re-examined by filmmaker Adam Curtis in his documentary program The Trap. Curtis interviewed Chagnon and put to him the assertion of fellow anthropologist Brian Ferguson that much of the Yanamamo violence, and particularly its intensity, was very strongly influenced by the presence of Westerners giving individuals goods, which were then fought over - in this case the goods were highly prized and useful machetes. Chagnon, however, insisted that his presence had had no influence whatsoever on the situation citing the fact that similar fights happened when he wasn't present, which he also documented. Curtis then asked, "You don't think a film crew in the middle of a fight in a village has an effect?" Chagnon replied, "No, I don't," and immediately walked out of the interview.

== See also ==
- Magical Death
- Yanomamö: The Fierce People
