= Linda Connor =

American photographer (born 1944)

- Born: November 18, 1944 (age 81); New York City, New York, U.S.
- Education: Rhode Island School of Design, Institute of Design at the Illinois Institute of Technology
- Known for: Photography

Linda Connor (born in New York, November 18, 1944) is an American photographer living in San Francisco, California. She is known for her landscape photography.

She has photographed in a multitude of countries throughout her career including, but not limited to, India, Mexico, Thailand, Ireland, Peru, and Nepal. Connor was a professor for the photography department at the San Francisco Art Institute, where she had taught since 1969. From 1985 to 1999 she also served as a board member for Friends of Photography. That same year, Connor then became founder & president of PhotoAlliance.

== Early life and career ==
Connor began working in photography at 17, exploring her interest in spiritualism. Her early photographic influences include Walker Evans, Emmet Gowin, Harry Callahan, Julia Margaret Cameron and Frederick Sommer.

She attended the Rhode Island School of Design between 1963 and 1967 where she received a BFA in photography. She later attended the Institute of Design, Illinois Institute of Technology between the years of 1967–1969, where she received her MS in photography.

In 1969, Connor began teaching at San Francisco Art Institute, instructing graduates and undergraduates for over 40 years.

Her first group exhibition was Vision and Expression at George Eastman House, in 1968 in Rochester, NY. In the entirety of her career she has received 11 awards, held over 40 solo exhibitions, and was featured in over 20 group exhibitions. These awards include a Guggenheim and three National Endowment for the Arts grants.

== Style and technique ==
One of Connor's most notable images include a photograph of a ceremonial cloth carefully wrapped around a tree trunk in Bali, petroglyphs hidden in the cliff dwellings of Arizona, star trails in Mexico, and votive candles arranged for ceremonial rites at Chartres. In her early work, Connor used an 8×10 inch Century View camera with a soft focus lens as a mechanism to imbue her photographs with a sense of abstraction. In her later work, Connor adjusted her camera to provide much greater clarity and detail. To achieve a sense of the mystical with a sharp lens, however, Connor photographed items and structures that are already perceived as mystical in themselves. In India and Nepal, she found sacred landscapes with ritual magic that she could photograph with a sharp lens and still achieve a sense of timelessness. Connor’s books present her photographs without titles (which are given at the end of her books) and with the places mixed up in no recognizable geographic or chronological order according to emotion and tone.

. In 2010, she began having her work reprinted in such varied formats as archival pigment prints, as an accordion-shaped book, and as large-format prints on silk.

== Prominent works ==
=== Petroglyphs ===
Some of Connor's photographs included petroglyphs. Connor and four other photographs attempted to preserve the petroglyphs photographically, resulting in the book, Marks in Place: Contemporary Responses to Prehistoric Rock Art (1988). A 1996 The New Yorker essay asserted that the photos "combine generalized forms, like shadows and silhouettes, with richly compelling detail." Connor captures man-made elements in natural environments in order to evoke spiritualism, "addressing quite literally the issue of how people have made their mark upon the landscape."

=== The Olson House ===
The Olson House is a colonial farmhouse located in Cushing, Maine. The popularity of this farmhouse came from its depiction in painter Andrew Wyeth's famed Christina's World. Connor is not the only artist to take photographs of Olson House. The location has also been photographed by such notable artists Paul Caponigro and George Tice. In 2006, Connor was commissioned to photograph the site by the Cincinnati Art Museum. Though a few of her photographs of the Olson House reference Wyeth, her depiction nonetheless accomplishes the difficult task of being distinctive and separate from Wyeth's .

=== Spiral Journey and Odyssey ===
Connor collected her life's photographic projects in two books, one titled Spiral Journey and the other titled Odyssey: Photographs by Linda Connor. Spiral Journey is an extensive retrospective book and exhibitions of her photographs made between 1967 and 1990 in Africa, Asia, Australia, Europe, North America, and South America. Odyssey: Photographs by Linda Connor is another retrospective book and exhibitions published by Chronicle Books in 2008 containing 133 photographs. The exhibitions toured across art museums in the US from 2008 – 2011 with a monograph containing "transcripts of conversations between Connor, Robert Adams and Emmet Gowin." These retrospectives make clear that Connor's primary interest has been exploring places "steeped in the passage of time and resonant with spirituality.” Both works primarily consist of landscape photography in relation to culture and to spiritualism, using an 8x10 inch view camera and printed on slow contact print paper.

== Feminism in landscape photography ==
Like other women photographers working within the subject matter, Connor contends that men have traditionally photographed landscapes. She offers instead a "theory of women's landscape imagery, one that posits a more intimate, emotional response to Nature because women somehow have more affinity with it."(Deborah Bright, p. 138) In a public lecture, Connor refers to photographer Gretchen Garner's thesis, "Reclaiming Paradise," Connor stated that male landscape photographers aim to 'conquer' the land with their photographs. Connor stated “is it too farfetched... to link man's passion for new lands, high places, the challenges of nature, landscape photography with pissing? This is territorial claiming and marking at its most basic. And what better place to piss off of than the top of a mountain-marking a vista." Although Connor's view has been criticized as "essentialist," she is not alone in believing that her landscapes convey a symbiotic relationship with nature.

== Awards ==
- 2005 Honored Educator, Society of Photographic Educators
- 2002 Flintridge Foundation Award for Visual Artists
- 2001 Flintridge Foundation Award for Visual Artists
- 1998 Best Book of the Year, 21st- A Contemporary Photography Journal, for On the Music of Spheres
- 1997 7th Annual LifeWork Award, Falkirk Cultural Center
- 1994 National Endowment for the Arts, Travel Grant
- 1988 Charles Pratt Award
- 1988 National Endowment for the Arts, Individual Grant
- 1986 Photographer of the Year, Peer Awards, Friends of Photography, Carmel, CA
- 1979 Guggenheim Fellowship
- 1976 National Endowment for the Arts, Individual Grant

== Exhibitions ==
=== Solo exhibitions ===
2017 LINDA CONNOR – Photographs, G. Gibson Gallery, Seattle, WA

2017 Linda Connor: Gravity, Florida Museum of Photographic Arts, Tampa, FL

2013 Linda Connor: From Two Worlds, di Rosa Center for Contemporary Art, Napa, CA

2013 Linda Connor: Continuum, Candela Books + Gallery, Richmond, VA

2012 Linda Connor, Clark Gallery, Lincoln, MA

2012 From Two Worlds, Haines Gallery, San Francisco, CA

2011 Odyssey: The Photographs of Linda Connor, Point Light Gallery, Surry Hills, Australia

2011 Linda Connor: New Direction, Viewpoint Gallery, Sacramento, CA

2010 Odyssey: The Photographs of Linda Connor, Palm Springs Art Museum, Palm Springs, CA

2010 Odyssey: The Photographs of Linda Connor, Museum of Art, Rhode Island School of Design, Providence, RI

2010 Linda Connor, Clark Gallery, Lincoln, MA

2010 Linda Connor: New Work, Newspace Center for Photography, Portland, OR

2009 Odyssey: the photographs of Linda Connor, Phoenix Art Museum, Phoenix, AZ

2009 Odyssey: the photographs of Linda Connor, Center for Creative Photography, Tucson, AZ

2009 Linda Connor, Joseph Bellows Gallery, La Jolla, CA

2009 Odyssey: The Photographs of Linda Connor, Southeast Museum of Photography, Daytona, FL

2008 Himalayas, Haines Gallery, San Francisco, CA

2007 Linda Connor Photographs, Sacramento State University, Sacramento, CA

2007 Olson House Photographs, Cincinnati Art Museum, Cincinnati, OH

2007 Linda Connor, Department of Design Gallery, Mariposa Hall, Sacramento State, Sacramento, CA

2006 Linda Connor Photographs, Sun Valley Art Museum, Ketchum, ID

2005 A Clear Vision” by Linda Connor, The Creative Center for Photography Freestyle, Los Angeles, CA

2004 Linda Connor: Starfields & Constellations, Yancey Richardson Gallery, New York, NY

2003 Linda Connor: Continuum, Haines Gallery, San Francisco, CA

2003 Time, Place, Sequences, Sonoma Museum of Visual Art at the Luther Burbank Center for the Arts, Santa Rosa, CA

2003 Linda Connor: Photographs, Photo Gallery International, Tokyo Japan

2001 Linda Connor, Glen Horowitz Bookseller, East Hampton, NY

2001 The Heavens, G. Gibson Gallery, Seattle, WA

2001 Recent Photographs, Haines Gallery, San Francisco, CA

2001 Towards Light, Yancey Richardson Gallery, New York, NY

1997 Linda Connor, Life Work Award, Falkirk Cultural Center, San Rafael, CA

1997 Linda Connor, PARTS Photographic Arts, Minneapolis, MN

1997 Linda Connor, Spectrum Gallery, Fresno, CA

1996 Linda Connor – Diptychs, photo-eye Gallery, Santa Fe, NM

1994 Earthly Constellations, National Museum of American Art, Washington, D.C.

1993 Earthly Constellations, Museum of Photographic Arts, San Diego, CA

1992 Harry Callahan & Linda Connor, Light Factory, Charlotte, NC

1992 Earthly Constellations, San Francisco Museum of Modern Art, San Francisco, CA

1990 Spiritual Journey, Museum of Contemporary Photography, Chicago, IL

1988 Linda Connor, Art Institute of Chicago, Chicago, IL

1988 Gallery Min, Tokyo, Japan

1986 Falkirk Cultural Center, San Rafael, California

1982 Center for Creative Photography, University of Arizona, Tucson, AZ

1976 Spectrum Gallery, Tucson

1973 Light Gallery, New York City, N.Y.

=== Group exhibitions ===
2023 The Curatorial Imagination of Walter Hopps, The Menil Collection, Houston, TX

2018 Speak to the Stones, and the Stars Answer, Haines Gallery, San Francisco, CA

2017 Shadowland: Photographs from the Collection, Daum Museum of Contemporary Art, Sedalia, MO

2017 Pop- Up, G. Gibson Gallery, Seattle, WA

2017 Maija Fiebig, Thuy-Van Vu and Linda Connor, G. Gibson Gallery, Seattle, WA

2017 The Poetry of Place, Cincinnati Art Museum, Cincinnati, OH

2017 The Sun Placed in the Abyss, Columbus Museum of Art, Columbus, OH

2016 LUX: The Radiant Sea, Yancey Richardson Gallery, New York, NY

2015 Regarding Trees: Vintage and Contemporary Selections, Joseph Bellows Gallery, San Diego, CA

2015 The Mapmaker's Dream, Haines Gallery, San Francisco, CA

2015 DWELL, G. Gibson Gallery, Seattle, WA

2014 Local Treasures: Bay Area Photography, Berkeley Art Center, Berkeley, CA

2014 Starstruck: The Fine Art of Astrophotography, James A. Michener Art Museum, Doylestown, PA

2012 SOLAR, photo-eye Gallery, Santa Fe, NM

2012 When Heaven Meets Earth, Datz Museum of Art, Gwangju-si, Gyeonggi-do, Korea

2012 Tracing Light, Datz Museum of Art, Gwangju-si, Gyeonggi-do, Korea

2012 Growth & Gravity: Linda Connor & Yoshitomo Saito, Goodwin Fine Art Gallery, Denver, CO

2012 Consilience: Photographers Operating at the Intersection of Art & Science, International Center of Photography, New York, NY

2000 Three Landscape Photographers, photo-eye Gallery, Santa Fe, NM

1994 Allan Chasanoff Photographic Collection: Tradition and the Unpredictable, The Museum of Fine Arts, Houston, TX

1994 Selections from the Permanent Collection: Image and Text, Center for Creative Photography, the University of Arizona, Tucson, AZ

1993 Mexico through Foreign Eyes, International Center for Photography, New York

1991 Between Home and Heaven: Contemporary American Landscape Photography, National Museum of American Art, Washington, DC

1990 Photographs by American Women Artists, California Museum of Photography, UC Riverside, Riverside, CA

1988 Landscapes from the Permanent Collection, Corcoran Gallery of Art, Washington, DC

1986 Artist in Mid-Career, San Francisco Museum of Modern Art, San Francisco, CA

1985 American Images, Photography 1945–80, Barbican Art Gallery, London, England

1982 The Contact Print, Friends of Photography, Carmel, CA

1979 American Photography in the '70, The Art Institute of Chicago, Chicago, IL

1977 Mirrors and Windows – American Photography Since 1960, Museum of Modern Art, New York City, NY

1976 8 X 10: Ten American Photographers, Dallas Museum of Fine Arts, Dallas, TX

1968 Vision and Expression, George Eastman House, Rochester, NY

== Collections ==
- Art Institute of Chicago, Chicago, IL
- Center for Creative Photography, University of Arizona, Tucson, AZ
- International Museum of Photography, George Eastman House, Rochester, NY
- J. Paul Getty Museum, Los Angeles, CA
- Museum of Modern Art, New York, NY
- National Gallery of Canada, Ottawa, ON
- Victoria and Albert Museum, London, England
- San Francisco Museum of Modern Art, San Francisco, CA
- Museum of Fine Arts, Houston, TX
- Stanford Art Museum, Palo Alto, CA
- Yale Art Museum, Yale University, CT
- Vassar College Art Gallery, Arlington, NY
- Rhode Island School of Design Museum, Providence, RI
- National Museum of American Art, Washington, D.C.
- Yildiz University, Istanbul, TU
- Honolulu Academy of Art, Honolulu, HI
- Canadian Center for Photography
- Seattle Art Museum, Seattle, WA
- San Jose Museum of Art, San Jose, CA
- New Mexico State University Art Gallery, University Park, NM
- The Minneapolis Institute of Arts, Minneapolis, MN

== Bibliography ==
Artists We’ve Known : Selected Works from the Walter Hopps and Caroline Huber Collection. Houston: The Menil Collection, 2023. ISBN 9780300269802

Odds & Ends. Linda Connor. Edition One Studios, 2010

Odyssey. Linda Connor. Chronicle, San Francisco, California, 2008 ISBN 9780811865012

Heaven / Earth. Linda Connor. Lodima Press / Michael A. Smith, 2008 ISBN 9781888899276

The Angle of Repose: Four American Photographers in Egypt. Emily Teeter. LaSalle Bank, N.A., 2002 ISBN 9780970245205

Black & White Photography. Manifest Visions / An International Collection. Numerous contributing photographers/James Luciana. Gloucester, Massachusetts, 2000 ISBN 9781564966476

Aperture 157 Steps in Space. Numerous contributing photographers / Mark Holburn. Aperture, New York, New York, 1999 ISBN 9780893818791

Contact Sheet 97. 25th Anniversary Edition. Jeffrey Hoone, Deborah Willis, Carole Kismaric, Marvin Heiferman, and Gary Nickard. Light Work, Syracuse, New York, 1998 ISBN 9780935445046

On the Music of the Spheres. Linda Connor. Whitney Museum, New York, New York, 1997

Visits. Linda Connor. Robert B. Menschel, Syracuse, New York, 1996

Luminance, LUX III. Linda Connor. Center for Photographic Arts, Carmel, California, 1995 ISBN 9780963039323

Photography in the 1990s: Fifty Portfolios. CD-ROM. Wright State University, Dayton, Ohio, 1995

Absorbing Light. Linda Connor/Michael Read. View Camera, July / August, 1994

Kyoto Journal: The Sacred Mountains of Asia. 1994

Between Home and Heaven: Contemporary American Landscape Photography. Natural Museum of American Art, Smithsonian Institution and the University of New Mexico, 1992 ISBN 9780826313645

Mexico through Foreign Eyes. Pilar Perez and Assoc., 1992

The Kiss of Apollo: Photography and Sculpture 1845 to Present. Fraenkel Gallery and Bedford, San Francisco, California, 1991

Spiral Journey. Linda Connor. Museum of Contemporary Photography, Columbia College, Chicago, Illinois, 1990

Women in Photography. Constance Sullivan. Abrams, New York, 1990

Decade by Decade: Twentieth Century American Photography. Collection of the Center for Creative Photography, Tucson, Arizona, 1989

Marks in Place. Linda Connor. University of New Mexico Press, Albuquerque, New Mexico, 1987 ISBN 9780826309754

Wanderlust. Work by Eight Contemporary Photographers from the Hallmark Photographic Collection. Keith F. Davis. Kansas City, Kansas, 1987 ISBN 9780875296210

Linda Connor. Linda Connor. Corcoran Gallery of Art, Washington, D.C., 1982

American Images: New Work by Twenty Contemporary Photographers. Renato Danese ed. McGraw-Hill, 1979 ISBN 9780070152953

Solos: Photographs by Linda Connor. Linda Connor. Millertown, New York, 1979 ISBN 9780934354042
