= Linda Connor (anthropologist) =

Australian anthropologist (born 1950)

Linda Helen Connor FASSA (born 1950 in Sydney) is an Australian anthropologist. She is Emeritus Professor of Anthropology at the University of Sydney.

== Background and career ==
Connor graduated from the University of Sydney with a Bachelor of Arts (Honours in Anthropology) in 1974 and a PhD in Anthropology in 1982. She is an elected Fellow of the Academy of the Social Sciences in Australia. From 2009-2018 she was Chair of the Department of Anthropology at the University of Sydney. She served two years as President of the Australian Anthropological Society from 2009–2010 and Vice President of the National Tertiary Education Union Sydney University Branch from 2018-21. She has held positions at the University of Newcastle, the Australian Research Council, University of California, and East-West Center, Hawai’i.

== Research ==
Connor has researched and published on religion and ritual, medical anthropology, development, visual anthropology, shamanism and healing, and rural environmental change, predominantly in Indonesia, India and Australia. Funding sources include the Australian Research Council, the Wenner-Gren Foundation and the Ford Foundation. In Indonesia, she studied transformations of development, economy and social life in Bali, as well as processes of citizenship and decentralization in rural communities. From 1978 to 1990 she collaborated with ethnographic filmmakers Patsy and Timothy Asch to produce a series of films and a film monograph based on the life and work of a Balinese healer, Jero Tapakan, and her village. In North India in the mid-1990s, she investigated questions of displacement, identity, and cultural innovation, as part of a team studying healing in diasporic Tibetan communities. Since 2002 she has worked on interdisciplinary projects focused on coal-affected localities, climate change and energy transitions in the Hunter Valley and North West New South Wales Australia. She is currently undertaking ethnographic research on social legitimacy of renewable energy development in Upper Spencer Gulf, South Australia as part of an ARC funded cross-national team.

== Selected publications ==
Goodman, J., Connor, L., Ghosh, D., Morton, T. S., Marshall, J., Mueller, K., Menon, M., Kholi, K., Pearse, R. and Rosewarne, S. 2020. The End of the Coal Rush: A Turning Point for Global Energy and Climate Policy? Cambridge University Press.

Connor, L. 2016. Climate Change and Anthropos: Planet, People and Places. London: Routledge/Earthscan.

Marshall, J. and Connor, L. (eds.) 2016. Environmental Change and the World’s Futures: Ecologies, Ontologies and Mythologies. London: Routledge/Earthscan.

Connor, L. 2010. “Anthropogenic Climate Change and Cultural Crisis: An Anthropological Perspective.” Australian Journal of Political Economy 66:247-267.

Higginbotham, N., Albrecht, G. and Connor, L. 2001. Health Social Science: A Transdisciplinary and Complexity Perspective. Melbourne, Oxford University Press. 382pp.
