= Marcus Banks (anthropologist) =

British anthropologist (1960–2020)

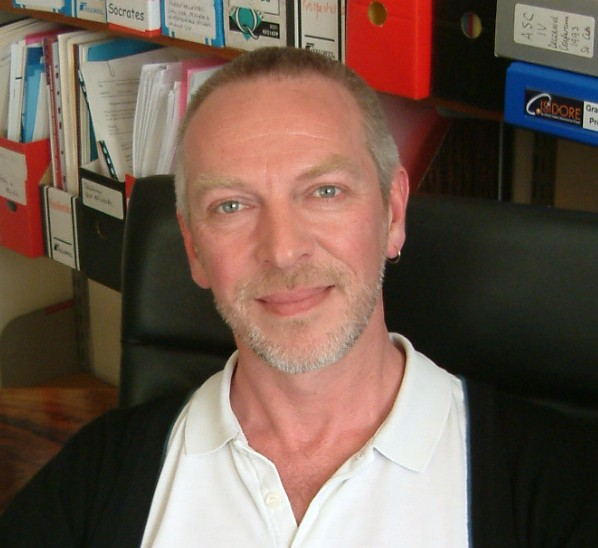
- Banks c. 2010
- Born: Marcus John Banks; 4 July 1960; Liverpool, England
- Died: 23 October 2020 (aged 60); Oxford, England
- Education: Doctorate, University of Cambridge 1985
- Known for: Visual anthropology
- Title: Professor of Visual Anthropology
- Scientific career
- Institutions: University of Oxford
- Website: www.wolfson.ox.ac.uk/news/professor-marcus-banks-obituary

Marcus John Banks (4 July 1960 – 23 October 2020 was an English visual anthropologist, who did fieldwork among the Jains in Leicester, England and Jamnagar, Gujarat, India. He was a prominent figure in the development of visual anthropology in the late 20th and early 21st Centuries.

== Early life ==
Born in Liverpool, he attended New Heys Comprehensive School, from where he went to Christ's College, University of Cambridge, in 1978, to study social anthropology. He was awarded a First class degree. He decided to stay in Cambridge to pursue a doctorate that was supervised by Deborah Swallow, which was awarded in 1985. His thesis was titled: On the Srawacs or Jains: processes of division and cohesion among two Jain communities in India and England.

== Career ==
After his doctorate he studied at the National Film and Television School (in 1986–1987) and made the film 'Raju and his friends'. He became a 'Demonstrator' (as departmental lecturers were then called) at Oxford's Institute of Social and Cultural Anthropology (ISCA) in 1987, later becoming University Lecturer before promotion to Professor in 2001. He served as Director of the School of Anthropology and Museum Ethnography from 2012 to 2016.

== Notable achievements ==
Banks had a one-year Royal Anthropological Institute fellowship at the National Film and Television School (in 1986–1987). He served as a University of Oxford Proctor (2007-2008) and was Wolfson College Vicegerent (deputy to the College President) (2014-2016). With funding from the ESRC he made a catalogue of early ethnographic film, the "Haddon Catalogue". This was a relatively pioneering initiative to make such information available online. It was online from 1996 until the mid-2000s.

== Awards and honours ==
He held visiting professorships at the Universities of Vienna (2010), Paris V Descartes (2011), and Canterbury, New Zealand (2012); and sat on the Royal Anthropological Institute's Film Committee (2001-2005), and the European Association of Social Anthropologists Executive Committee (2017-2019)]. He has given keynote lectures at numerous international conferences.

Instances of his work being discussed by prominent scholars include for visual anthropology, Paul Hockings and Sarah Pink as well as the 2020 volume 'The Routledge International Handbook of Ethnographic Film and Video' edited by Phillip Vannini and several mentions in The SAGE Handbook of Visual Research Methods (2020)

In 1997, his work was discussed in a review article by John E. Cort in Religious Studies Review. Cort concludes his discussion thus: 'Banks's book is valuable on two fronts, as one of the few detailed ethnographies of Jains in India and as the only monograph to date on diaspora Jains.' 105. Cort published an obituary in the Newsletter of the Centre of Jaina Studies (ISSN 2059-416X) CoJs Newsletter Issue 16 - June 2021

An interview with him by Rasa Račiūnaitė-Paužuolienė was published in February 2021 in the Journal of the Anthropological Society of Oxford. Note that the original interview was conducted in Oxford on 2 May 2013. It was subsequently published in Lithuanian in Lithuanian Ethnology: Studies in Social Anthropology and Ethnology, 14 (23), 237-45 (2014).

== Selected publications ==
- Banks, Marcus (1992). Organizing Jainism in India and England. Oxford studies in social and cultural anthropology. Oxford: Clarendon Press. ISBN 9780198273882. OCLC 862147085.
- Banks, Marcus (1996). Ethnicity : anthropological constructions. London: Routledge. ISBN 9780415078016. OCLC 730120511.
- Marcus Banks; Howard Morphy (1997). Rethinking visual anthropology. New Haven: Yale University Press. ISBN 9780300078541. OCLC 867943550.
- Banks, Marcus; Gingrich, André (2006). Neo-nationalism in Europe and beyond: Perspectives from social anthropology. Oxford: Berghahn Publishers. ISBN 978-1-84545-190-5.
- Banks, Marcus (2012). Visual methods in social research. London: SAGE. ISBN 978-0761963646. OCLC 912486571.
- Banks, Marcus; Ruby, Jay (2011). Made to be seen : perspectives on the history of visual anthropology. Chicago: University of Chicago Press. ISBN 9780226036625.
- Banks, Marcus; Motrescu-Mayes, Annamaria (2018). Visual histories of South Asia. Delhi: Primus Books. ISBN 978-93-86552-44-0.
- Banks, Marcus (2018). Using visual data in qualitative research. London: SAGE. ISBN 9781473913196.
- Banks, Marcus; Zeitlyn, David; El Khachab, Chihab (2025). Understanding Social Images. Essays on Visual Methods and Teaching Anthropology. Oxford: Berghahn Books. doi:10.3167/978136950066. ISBN 978-1-83695-006-6.

== Film ==
Raju and His Friends 1988 40' Directed by Marcus Banks Banks discussed the film in a blog post in 2014. It is also discussed in the posthumously published book "Understanding Social Images" (2025).
