= James J. Fox =

American historian and anthropologist

James Joseph Fox (born 29 May 1940) is an American anthropologist and historian of Indonesia.

He was educated at Harvard University (AB 1962) and Oxford University in (Social Anthropology)(B Litt. 1965, DPhil. 1968) where he was a Rhodes Scholar. The title of his doctoral thesis was The Rotinese: A study of the social organisation of an eastern indonesian people

His long-term position was in the Anthropology Department of the Research School of Pacific (and Asian) Studies, of which he was Director in 1998–2006. He also taught at various universities including Harvard, Cornell, Duke and Chicago in the U.S., and various European Universities including Leiden, Bielefeld and the École des Hautes Études en Sciences Sociales.

He was elected a foreign member of the Royal Netherlands Academy of Arts and Sciences in 1988 and is a Fellow of the Academy of the Social Sciences in Australia.

He has conducted fieldwork in Java, Roti, and East Timor.

He has also been an administrator at Australian National University at the Research School of Pacific and Asian Studies.

He is currently Professorial fellow in the ANU Resource Management in Asia-Pacific Program (RMAP).

== Works include:- ==
- 1977 Harvest of the Palm: Ecological Change in Eastern Indonesia.
- 1980 The Flow of Life: Essays on Eastern Indonesia.
- 1980 Indonesia: The Making of a Culture. (Vol 1 of 3 volumes of Indonesia: Australian Perspectives)
- 1980 Indonesia: Australian Perspectives. Canberra: Research School of Pacific Studies, The Australian National University [3 volumes published as a single volume, with editors:J.J. Fox, R.G. Garnaut, P.T. McCawley, and J.A.C. Mackie.]
- 1986 Bahasa, Sastra dan Sejarah: Kumpulan Karangan Mengenai Masyarakat Pulau Roti. Jakarta: Penerbit Djambatan.[Language, Literature and History: Collected Essays on Rotinese Society.Six essays in English on Rotinese culture and history with accompanying Indonesian translations.]
- 1988 To Speak in Pairs: Essays on the Ritual Languages of Eastern Indonesia.
- 1992 The Heritage of Traditional Agriculture Among the Western Austronesians.
- 1993 Balanced Development: East Java in the New Order.
- 1993 Inside Austronesian Houses: Perspectives on Domestic Designs for Living.
- 1995 The Austronesians: Historical and Comparative Perspectives.
- 1996 Origin, Ancestry and Alliance: Explorations in Austronesian Ethnography.
