= Robert Borofsky =

American anthropologist

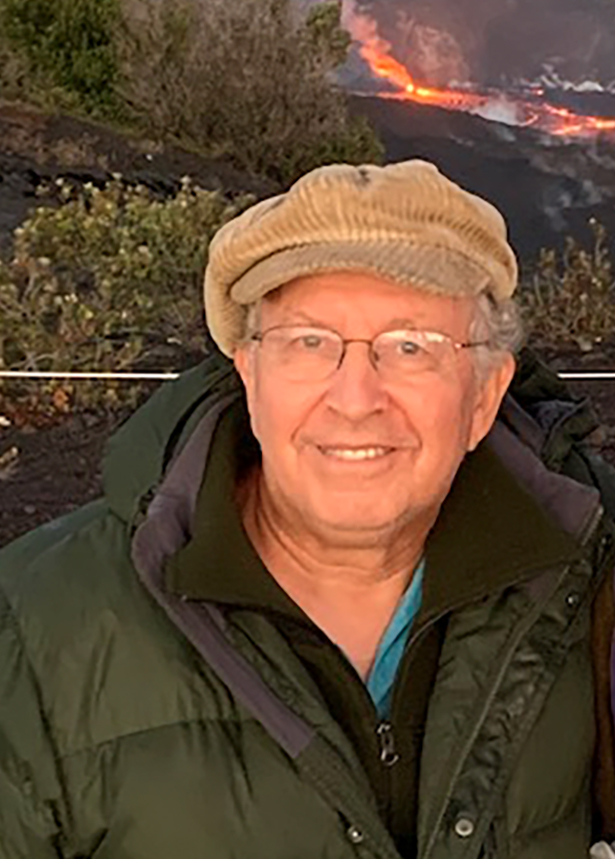
- Photo of Dr. Robert Borofsky in front of a volcano
- Born: 1944
- Nationality: American
- Spouse: Nancy Schildt (m. 1973)
- Children: 2
- Grandchildren: 4
- Fields: Public anthropology, Cultural anthropology, Pacific Studies
- Retired: 2020

Robert Borofsky is an American anthropologist specializing in public anthropology and the Pacific. A number of his works continue to be read in college curricula today. Before retiring in 2020, Borofsky concentrated on undergraduate education as a Professor of Anthropology at Hawaii Pacific University. In 2001, he initiated the California Series in Public Anthropology, successfully editing the series for over a decade. Two presidents (Mikhail Gorbachev and Bill Clinton) as well as three Nobel Laureates (Amartya Sen, Jody Williams, and Mikhail Gorbachev) have contributed to the Series either through books or forwards. Now retired, he directs the Center for a Public Anthropology focusing on the Center’s Public Anthropology Project which annually involves thousands of introductory anthropology students from across Canada and the United States.

== Career ==
Robert Borofsky received his Ph.D. from the University of Hawaiʻi at Mānoa. Along with his wife and a daughter, he spent 41 months – from 1977-81 – on the coral atoll of Pukapuka carrying out field research for his doctoral dissertation examining Pukapukan and anthropological conceptions of the past which, in revised form, was published as Making History: Pukapukan and Anthropological Conceptions of Knowledge (1987).

In addition, Borofsky is the author or editor of a number of other books including, Remembrance of Pacific Pasts: An Invitation to Remake History (2000, open access 2020), Yanomami: The Fierce Controversy and What We Can Learn From It (2005), Why a Public Anthropology (2011), An Anthropology of Anthropology: Is it Time to Shift Paradigms (open access 2019) and Revitalizing Anthropology: Let’s Focus the Field on Benefiting Others.

A sense of these books’ impact can be seen in the praise they have garnered from prominent intellectual figures. In respect to Remembrance of Pacific Pasts, Claude Lévi-Strauss writes:

"History is always interpretation. The French Revolution as told by an aristocrat and by a sansculotte are not the same. The problem is how to bring these different views together in a way that makes sense of the whole. Rob Borofsky wonderfully succeeds at this difficult task. He turns widely different points of view into an asset. The narrative ceases being linear. We have instead a multidimensional history that the reader must approach from several angles and the meaning of which, like that of a musical piece, is apprehended globally. Remembrance of Pacific Pasts is a very impressive and important work."

Natalie Zemon-Davis states the book “is brimming over with new ideas about how history can be found, rethought, understood, and told . . . Rob Borofsky’s edited volume is multicentered, dialogic history at its best.”

Paul Farmer views Why a Public Anthropology? as “a gem of a resource for anyone interested in anthropology . . . Borofsky’s final message is one of transformation: he calls on those both within the discipline and without to practice anthropology in service of the public—to not simply “do no harm,” but to do good.” Noam Chomsky writes “This provocative study sets ambitious goals for what might be achieved by a public anthropology and offers ways to carry forward a project that could be far-reaching in its consequences.”

In respect to An Anthropology of Anthropology, David Graeber writes “Anthropologists have written almost nothing about conditions of work, patronage, funding, institutional hierarchy in the academy—that is, the power relations under which anthropological writing is actually produced. Rob Borofsky is one of the few who’s had the requisite courage to do so.” Nancy Scheper-Hughes asserts, “Borofsky’s book is brimming with ideas for redefining anthropology. He shows close up through case studies how the institutional structures of the academy have controlled and restricted anthropology as an intellectual discipline. He asks tough questions about individual accountability, ethics, and self-interests. . . . I recommend this incisive and valuable book to anyone who cares about the future of our field. Once you read it, you will see why.”

George Marcus considers Revitalizing Anthropology:

"an extraordinary and seminal intervention/contribution in Rob Borofsky’s career-long insistence on making anthropology literally beneficial to others. He taps into the spirit and motivating impulses of current graduate student projects in several locations globally. In so doing, he provides a much-needed resource for teaching introductory graduate program seminars, especially in the leading departments of the classic metropole.”

Robert Borofsky coined the now widely cited term public anthropology, first for the University of California book series he edited and then for the field itself. In 2018, Borofsky suggested four strategies that collectively emphasized public anthropology’s paradigm-shifting intent.

- Benefitting Others. Rejecting the minimalist ethic of “do no harm” in favor of a more positive, affirmative stance – one that seeks to benefit others by addressing social inequalities and alleviating suffering both in print and in practice.
- Fostering Alternative Forms of Accountability. Challenging evaluation systems that privilege publication quantity, and instead, focusing more on the real-world impact of anthropological research.
- Transparency. Calling on anthropologists to share their fieldnotes to enable cumulative knowledge, while also exposing the patronage dynamics that govern hiring and publication within the discipline. As Justice Louis Brandeis famously stated: “Publicity is justly commended as a remedy for social and industrial diseases. Sunlight is said to be the best of disinfectants; electric light the most efficient policeman.”
- Collaborating with Others. Insisting that meaningful change requires working alongside non-academic partners rather than speaking only to disciplinary insiders.

In line with these strategies, Borofsky played a significant role during the Yanomami Blood Controversy – a controversy that attracted world-wide attention (see Borofsky 2005:3) – in getting American universities to return the Yanomami blood samples they held in cold storage.

For a signed note of appreciation by the key Yanomami spokesperson and shaman, DAVI KOPENAWA YANOMAMI, to Bruce Albert and Rob Borofsky for their help in this successful campaign, please click here.

With Shawn Rodriguez, he produced a set of online introductory anthropology lectures that Vimeo indicates have been viewed more than 57,000 times. For several years, Borofsky has worked with Altmetrics.com, highlighting anthropologists whose publications attract the broader public’s attention – particularly in news outlets and policy documents from around the world (see and especially). In a rare move for an anthropologist, in 2024 he published his fieldnotes – numbering over 12,000 pages – on the internet for Pukapukans and others to read and comment on.

== Books ==
- 2023 Revitalizing Anthropology Let's Focus the Field on Benefiting Others: Graduate Student Visions from Australia, Canada, China, Guatemala, Japan, The United States, and Zimbabwe. Editor. Kailua, Hi: Center for a Public. Open Access https://books.publicanthropology.org/revitalizing-anthropology.pdf
- 2019 An Anthropology Of Anthropology: Is It Time To Shift Paradigms? Kailua, Hi: Center For A Public Anthropology. ISBN 978-1-7322241-3-1 Open Access https://books.publicanthropology.org/an-anthropology-of-anthropology.html
- 2018A Showing Anthropology Matters: Public Anthropology in Action. Editor. Kailua, Hi: Center For A Public Anthropology Center For A Public Anthropology. Open Access https://books.publicanthropology.org/showing-anthropology-matters.html
- 2018B Why A Public Anthropology? Abridged And Revised Student Edition https://publicanthropology.net/static/pdf/why_a_public_anthropology.pdf
- 2011 Why A Public Anthropology? Kailua, Hi. Center for a Public Anthropology.
- 2005 Yanomami: The Fierce Controversy And What We Can Learn From It. Editor. Berkeley, Ca: University Of California Press. ISBN 978-0-520-24404-7 Https://Www.Ucpress.Edu/Books/Yanomami/Paper
- 2000 Remembrance Of Pacific Pasts: An Invitation To Remake History, Editor. Honolulu, Hi: University Of Hawaii Press). ISBN 978-0-8248-8801-5 Open Access https://scholarspace.manoa.hawaii.edu/server/api/core/bitstreams/8a6c5dc4-f49e-47ff-ade4-83a0c9e43f10/content
- 1994 Assessing Cultural Anthropology, Editor New York, Ny: Mcgraw-Hill. ISBN 978-0-07-006578-9
- 1989 Developments In Polynesian Ethnology, Coeditor With Alan Howard. Honolulu, Hi: University Of Hawaii Press) ISBN 978-0-8248-8195-5 (Epub) Open Access https://scholarspace.manoa.hawaii.edu/server/api/core/bitstreams/55a2fd68-987f-420a-a286-83a54eb94c9b/content
- 1987 Making History; Pukapukan And Anthropological Constructions Of Knowledge, (New York: Cambridge University Press). ISBN 978-0-521-39648-6

== See also ==
- 2024 Pukapukan Fieldnotes Published on the internet at https://www.publicanthropology.org/detailed-outline/
- 2024 Ricardo Lopes. #1026. Interview with Robert Borofsky: An Anthropology of Anthropology. Link
- 2014 Gerhard Hoffstaedter World101x: Interview with Rob Borofsky. Link
- 2011 David Vine "Public Anthropology" in Its Second Decade: Robert Borofsky's Center for a Public Anthropology". American Anthropologist. 113 (2): 336–339. doi:10.1111/j.1548-1433.2011.01334.x. ISSN 1548-1433.
- 1997 Robert Borofsky Cook, Lono, Obeyesekere, and Sahlins. Current Anthropology, 38,2: 255-282 https://www.jstor.org/stable/10.1086/204608
