= Visual anthropology =

Subfield of social anthropology

Visual anthropology is a subfield of social anthropology that is concerned, in part, with the study and production of ethnographic photography, film and, since the mid-1990s, new media. More recently it has been used by historians of science and visual culture. Although sometimes wrongly conflated with ethnographic film, visual anthropology encompasses much more, including the anthropological study of all visual representations such as dance and other kinds of performance, museums and archiving, all visual arts, and the production and reception of mass media. Histories and analyses of representations from many cultures are part of visual anthropology: research topics include sandpaintings, tattoos, sculptures and reliefs, cave paintings, scrimshaw, jewelry, hieroglyphics, paintings and photographs. Also within the province of the subfield are studies of human vision, properties of media, the relationship of visual form and function, and applied, collaborative uses of visual representations.

Multimodal anthropology describes the latest turn in the subfield, which considers how emerging technologies like immersive virtual reality, augmented reality, mobile apps, social networking, gaming along with film, photography and art is reshaping anthropological research, practice and teaching.

== History ==
Even before the emergence of anthropology as an academic discipline in the 1880s, ethnologists used photography as a tool of research. Anthropologists and non-anthropologists conducted much of this work in the spirit of salvage ethnography or attempts to record for posterity the ways-of-life of societies assumed doomed to extinction (see, for instance, the Native American photography of Edward Curtis)

The history of anthropological filmmaking is intertwined with that of non-fiction and documentary filmmaking, although ethnofiction may be considered as a genuine subgenre of ethnographic film. Some of the first motion pictures of the ethnographic other were made with Lumière equipment (Promenades des Éléphants à Phnom Penh, 1901).

Robert Flaherty, probably best known for his films chronicling the lives of Arctic peoples (Nanook of the North, 1922), became a filmmaker in 1913 when his supervisor suggested that he take a camera and equipment with him on an expedition north. Flaherty focused on "traditional" Inuit ways of life, omitting with few exceptions signs of modernity among his film subjects (even to the point of refusing to use a rifle to help kill a walrus his informants had harpooned as he filmed them, according to Barnouw; this scene made it into Nanook where it served as evidence of their "pristine" culture). This pattern would persist in many ethnographic films to follow (see as an example Robert Gardner's Dead Birds). Flaherty is cited by Inuk photographers such as Peter Pitseolak as a key motivator for starting a photography practice. Pitseolak met Flaherty, and was inspired to document everyday Inuit life from his own perspective, at a time of immense societal change and government intrusion in the Canadian North.

By the 1940s and early 1950s, anthropologists such as Hortense Powdermaker, Gregory Bateson, Margaret Mead (Trance and Dance in Bali, 1952) and Mead and Rhoda Metraux, eds., (The Study of Culture at a Distance, 1953) were bringing anthropological perspectives to bear on mass media and visual representation. Karl G. Heider notes in his revised edition of Ethnographic Film (2006) that after Bateson and Mead, the history of visual anthropology is defined by "the seminal works of four men who were active for most of the second half of the twentieth century: Jean Rouch, John Marshall, Robert Gardner, and Tim Asch. By focusing on these four, we can see the shape of ethnographic film" (p. 15). Many, including Peter Loizos, would add the name of filmmaker/author David MacDougall to this select group.

In 1966, filmmaker Sol Worth and anthropologist John Adair taught a group of Navajo Indians in Arizona how to capture 16mm film. The hypothesis was that artistic choices made by the Navajo would reflect the 'perceptual structure' of the Navajo world. The goals of this experiment were primarily ethnographic and theoretical. Decades later, however, the work has inspired a variety of participatory and applied anthropological initiatives - ranging from photovoice to virtual museum collections - in which cameras are given to local collaborators as a strategy for empowerment.

In the United States, Visual Anthropology first found purchase in an academic setting in 1958 with the creation of the Film Study Center at Harvard's Peabody Museum of Archaeology and Ethnology. In the United Kingdom, The Granada Centre for Visual Anthropology at the University of Manchester was established in 1987 to offer training in anthropology and film-making to MA, MPhil and PhD students and whose graduates have produced over 300 films to date. John Collier, Jr. wrote the first standard textbook in the field in 1967, and many visual anthropologists of the 1970s relied on semiologists like Roland Barthes for essential critical perspectives. Contributions to the history of Visual Anthropology include those of Emilie de Brigard (1967), Fadwa El Guindi (2004), and Beate Engelbrecht, ed. (2007). A more recent history that understands visual anthropology in a broader sense, edited by Marcus Banks and Jay Ruby, is Made To Be Seen: Historical Perspectives on Visual Anthropology. Turning the anthropological lens on India provides a counterhistory of visual anthropology (Khanduri 2014). More broadly, visual anthropology recently involves a call to make visual culture central to the exploration of social and political experience; to give primacy to the visual, against a conventional approach in the social sciences that treats the visual as secondary to written sources and discourse (Pinney 2005; Kalantzis 2019).

In the 2010s, a new movement emerged within visual anthropology focusing on the creation of graphic ethnographies—anthropological works that combine visual narratives with traditional ethnographic research. This approach uses comic book and graphic novel formats to communicate anthropological insights, making complex cultural analysis more accessible to broader audiences while exploring new forms of scholarly expression. The University of Toronto Press launched the ethnoGRAPHIC series in 2017, beginning with Lissa: A Story about Medical Promise, Friendship, and Revolution by Sherine Hamdy and Coleman Nye. Other notable works in this emerging field include Forecasts: A Story of Weather and Finance at the Edge of Disaster (Schuster et al. 2023), V. Chitra's Drawing Coastlines: Climate Anxieties and the Visual Reinvention of Mumbai's Shore (2024), both of which demonstrate how graphic anthropology can illuminate the complex intersections between climate change, environmental management, and cultural understanding through visual storytelling that captures the lived experiences of communities grappling with environmental uncertainty. This multimodal approach represents a significant expansion of visual anthropology's methodological toolkit, demonstrating how the medium of comics can serve both as a research method and a form of ethnographic representation that captures aspects of cultural experience that traditional text-based ethnography might not fully convey.

At present, the Society for Visual Anthropology (SVA) represents the subfield in the United States as a section of the American Anthropological Association, the AAA.

In the United States, ethnographic films are shown each year at the Margaret Mead Film Festival as well as at the AAA's annual Film and Media Festival. In Europe, ethnographic films are shown at the Royal Anthropological Institute Film Festival in the UK, The Jean Rouch Film Festival in France, Ethnocineca in Austria and Ethnofest in Greece. Dozens of other international festivals are listed regularly in the Newsletter of the Nordic Anthropological Film Association [NAFA].

== Timeline and breadth of prehistoric visual representation ==
While art historians are clearly interested in some of the same objects and processes, visual anthropology places these artifacts within a holistic cultural context. Archaeologists, in particular, use phases of visual development to try to understand the spread of humans and their cultures across contiguous landscapes as well as over larger areas. By 10,000 BP, a system of well-developed pictographs was in use by boating peoples and was likely instrumental in the development of navigation and writing, as well as a medium of storytelling and artistic representation. Early visual representations often show the female form, with clothing appearing on the female body around 28,000 BP, which archaeologists know now corresponds with the invention of weaving in Old Europe. This is an example of the holistic nature of visual anthropology: a figurine depicting a woman wearing diaphanous clothing is not merely an object of art, but a window into the customs of dress at the time, household organization (where they are found), transfer of materials (where the clay came from) and processes (when did firing clay become common), when did weaving begin, what kind of weaving is depicted and what other evidence is there for weaving, and what kinds of cultural changes were occurring in other parts of human life at the time.

Visual anthropology, by focusing on its own efforts to make and understand visual representations, is able to establish many principles and build theories about human visual representation in general.

== See also ==
- Ethnofiction
- Ethnographic film
- Gregory Bateson
- John Collier Jr.
- Multimodal Anthropology
- Visual Anthropology (journal)
- Visual sociology

== Bibliography ==
- Alloa, Emmanuel (ed.) Penser l'image II. Anthropologies du visuel. Dijon: Presses du réel 2015. ISBN 978-2-84066-557-1 (in French).
- Banks, Marcus; Morphy, Howard (Hrsg.): Rethinking Visual Anthropology. New Haven: Yale University Press 1999. ISBN 978-0-300-07854-1
- Marcus Banks and David Zeitlyn, 2015. Visual methods in social research (Second Edition), Sage: London
- Barbash, Ilisa and Lucien Taylor. Cross-cultural Filmmaking: A Handbook for Making Documentary and Ethnographic Films and Videos. Berkeley: University of California Press, 1997.
- Bassnet, Sarah and Sarah Parsons. Photography in Canada, 1839-1989: An Illustrated History. 2023, Art Canada Institute: Toronto.
- Collier, Malcolm et al.: Visual Anthropology. Photography As a Research Method. University of Mexico 1986. ISBN 978-0-8263-0899-3
- Daniels, Inge. 2010. The Japanese House: Material Culture in the Modern Home. Oxford: Berg Publishers.
- Coote, Jeremy and Anthony Shelton. 1994. Anthropology, Art and Aesthetics. Clarendon Press.
- Edwards, Elisabeth (Hrsg.): Anthropology and Photography 1860–1920. New Haven, London 1994, Nachdruck. ISBN 978-0-300-05944-1
- Engelbrecht, Beate (ed.). Memories of the Origins of Ethnographic Film. Frankfurt am Main et al.: Peter Lang Verlag, 2007.
- Grimshaw, Anna. The Ethnographer's Eye: Ways of Seeing in Modern Anthropology. Cambridge: Cambridge University Press, 2001.
- Harris, Claire. 2012. The Museum on the Roof of the World: Art, Politics and the Representation of Tibet. University of Chicago Press.
- Harris, Claire and Michael O'Hanlon. 2013. 'The Future of the Ethnographic Museum,' Anthropology Today, 29(1). pp. 8–12.
- Heider, Karl G. Ethnographic Film (Revised Edition). Austin: University of Texas Press, 2006.
- Hockings, Paul (ed.). "Principles of Visual Anthropology." 3rd edn. Berlin: Mouton de Gruyter, 2003.
- Kalantzis, Konstantinos. Tradition in the Frame: Photography, Power and Imagination in Sfakia, Crete. Bloomington: Indiana University Press.
- MacDougall, David. Transcultural Cinema. Princeton: Princeton University Press, 1998.
- Martinez, Wilton. 1992. “Who Constructs Anthropological Knowledge? Toward a Theory of Ethnographic Film Spectatorship.” In Film as Ethnography, D. Turton and P. Crawford, (Eds.), pp. 130–161. Manchester: Manchester University Press.
- Mead, Margaret: Anthropology and the camera. In: Morgan, Willard D. (Hg.): Encyclopedia of photography. New York 1963.
- Morton, Chris and Elizabeth Edwards (eds.) 2009. Photography, Anthropology and History: Expanding the Frame. Farnham: Ashgate Publishing
- Peers, Laura. 2003. Museums and Source Communities: A Routledge Reader, Routledge
- Pink, Sarah: Doing Visual Ethnography: Images, Media and Representation in Research. London: Sage Publications Ltd. 2006. ISBN 978-1-4129-2348-4
- Pinney, Christopher: Photography and Anthropology. London: Reaktion Books 2011. ISBN 978-1-86189-804-3
- Prins, Harald E. L. "Visual Anthropology." pp. 506–525. In A Companion to the Anthropology of American Indians. Ed. T. Biolsi. Oxford: Blackwell Publishing, 2004.
- Prins, Harald E. L., and Ruby, Jay eds. "The Origins of Visual Anthropology." Visual Anthropology Review. Vol. 17 (2), 2001–2002.
- Ruby, Jay. Picturing Culture: Essays on Film and Anthropology. Chicago: University of Chicago Press, 2000, ISBN 978-0-226-73099-8.
- Worth, Sol, Adair John. "Through Navajo Eyes". Indiana University Press; 1972.
