= Tim Asch =

American anthropologist, photographer and ethnographic filmmaker

Timothy Asch
- Born: July 16, 1932; Southampton, New York
- Died: October 3, 1994 (aged 62); Los Angeles, California
- Occupations: Professor, USC Center for Visual Anthropology
- Writing career
- Genre: Visual anthropology
- Notable work: The Ax Fight

Timothy Asch (July 16, 1932 – October 3, 1994) was an American anthropologist, photographer, and ethnographic filmmaker. Along with John Marshall and Robert Gardner, Asch played an important role in the development of visual anthropology. He is particularly known for his film The Ax Fight and his role with the USC Center for Visual Anthropology.

== Background ==
Asch was born in Southampton, New York and attended The Putney School. He studied at Columbia University, where he received his B.S. in anthropology in 1959. While at Columbia, he served as a teaching assistant for Margaret Mead, who encouraged his work in visual anthropology. From 1950 to 1951, he served apprenticeships with Minor White, Edward Weston and Ansel Adams through the San Francisco Art Institute (formerly known as the California School of Fine Arts). He received his M.A. in African Studies from Boston University (with an anthropology concentration at Harvard University) in 1964.

== Career ==
Asch was known for his work as an ethnographic filmmaker on the Yanomami in conjunction with Napoleon Chagnon. He also worked in Indonesia with anthropologists Linda Connor, James J. Fox and E. Douglas Lewis.

In 1968, Asch and John Marshall co-founded Documentary Educational Resources (DER), a non-profit organization whose mission is to support, produce, and distribute ethnographic, non-fiction, and documentary films. Asch's film work continues to be distributed through DER.

Asch taught at New York University, Brandeis University, and Harvard University, and was a Research Fellow at the Australian National University prior to joining the University of Southern California (USC) in 1982. He became the Director of the Center for Visual Anthropology after the death of founder Barbara Myerhoff. During his period at USC, he was involved with the Margaret Mead Film Festival.

Asch acted as Director of the Center for Visual Anthropology up until his death from cancer on October 3, 1994. The Spring 1995 issue of Visual Anthropology Review (Vol. 11, No.1) was dedicated to Asch.

== Filmography ==
Asch was a prolific filmmaker with an extensive list of more than 70 films to his credit. Over 40 of these are short films on the Yanomami in collaboration with Napoleon Chagnon.

Asch made most of his films for educational classroom use. He often showed his films to students and edited them based on student feedback. In one semester, Asch edited The Ax Fight up to twenty five times to make it more understandable and ideal for teaching. He was also a proponent of using film as a research and archive tool.

== Marriage and family ==
Asch married Patricia Wood. Together they acted as partners with other anthropologists in Afghanistan and Indonesia to produce films widely used in education and research. They had four children: two daughters, Caya and Kim (who was adopted from South Korea) and sons Gregory (also known as DJ Olive) and Alexander.

== Obituaries ==
- Zsa Zsa Gershick, "ETHNOGRAPHIC FILMMAKING PIONEER TIMOTHY ASCH DIES", USC News, 17 Oct 1994, University of Southern California

== Further reading and viewing ==
=== Film ===
- Jayasinhji Jhala and Lindsey Powell. Morning with Asch. - 45 min. documentary (1995)

=== Text ===
- Abrams, Ira. "Anthropological Filmmaking: Anthropological Perspectives on the Production of Film and Video for General Public Audiences." Visual Anthropology Review. 5.2, December 1989: 18–24.
- Barbash, Ilisa and Lucien Taylor. Cross-cultural Filmmaking: A Handbook for Making Documentary and Ethnographic Films and Videos. Berkeley: University of California Press, 1997.
- Heider, Karl G. Ethnographic Film (Revised Edition). Austin: University of Texas Press, 2006.
- Japenga, Ann. "Visual Anthropologist in the Director's Chair", Los Angeles Times, June 17, 1987: Section 5, page 1.
- Lewis, E. Douglas. Timothy Asch and Ethnographic Film. New York: Routledge, 2003
- Ruby, Jay. "Out of Sync: The Cinema of Tim Asch", in Picturing Culture: Essays on Film and Anthropology, Chicago: University of Chicago Press, 2000.
- Jay Ruby, "Some Hurried Thoughts about Tim Asch and Patrick Tierney", Darkness in El Dorado Blog
- "Finding Aid to the Papers of Timothy Asch", National Anthropological Archives, National Museum of Natural History, Smithsonian Institution
