= Video ethnography =

Research method using video recordings

Video ethnography is the video recording of the stream of activity of subjects in their natural setting, in order to experience, interpret, and represent culture and society. Ethnographic video, in contrast to ethnographic film, cannot be used independently of other ethnographic methods, but rather as part of the process of creation and representation of societal, cultural, and individual knowledge. It is commonly used in the fields of visual anthropology, visual sociology, visual ethnography and cultural studies. Uses of video in ethnography include the recording of certain processes and activities, visual note-taking, and ethnographic diary-keeping.

Video ethnography involves:
• Observation, including extensive filming of practitioners,
• Allowing practitioners to view the video recorded material and reflexively discuss their practice,
• Transforming practice through practitioner led change, and
• Building the capacity for the ongoing and critical appraisal of practice.

Video-ethnographic methods seek to foreground practitioner knowledge, expertise, and insight into the dynamics of their own work processes. This is achieved by first talking with practitioners about their work and organizational processes, and by seeking an articulation of the social, professional, environmental, and organizational contingencies that both enable and constrain their practice. By allowing practitioners to discuss their practices in response to video footage clinicians and researchers gain insight into areas of practice that may be benefit from redesign. Video ethnography is contingent on the researcher gaining the trust of practitioners, on becoming familiar with the site and on being trusted to be present at time and in places where critical conducts are undertaken.

== History ==
Photos and moving pictures have been used by ethnographers since soon after they were invented. The first ethnographic film occurred in 1895 by Felix-Louis Regnault who filmed a Senegalese woman making pots. Film was used among many researchers however it was Margaret Mead and Gregory Bateson who first used methods of visual ethnography such as photos and film as scientific instruments. They opened up the potential of photography and film as analytical tools and data repositories. Visual anthropologists became very interested in the use of video on the 1980s for its convenience, durability, economy and utility. Since the 1990s researchers from different disciplines began to engage with videos as distinct from ethnographic films. This involved the reflexive use of the video as a medium to create knowledge and not just to store data. Technological developments, such as the use of digital video, continue to offer new possibilities for the use of videos in ethnography.

== Advantages of video ethnography ==
According to Wayne Fife, the goal of ethnographic research is to formulate a pattern of analysis that makes reasonable sense out of human actions within a context of a specific place and time. The use of videos can help ethnographers achieve this goal.
Joseph Schaeffer names four primary ways in which the use of video can be advantageous to ethnographic research:

1. Videos allow for coverage of activities in much of their complexity in their natural settings over an extended period of time. This coverage can be used to supplement written accounts and provides a context for the limited coverage by other methods.
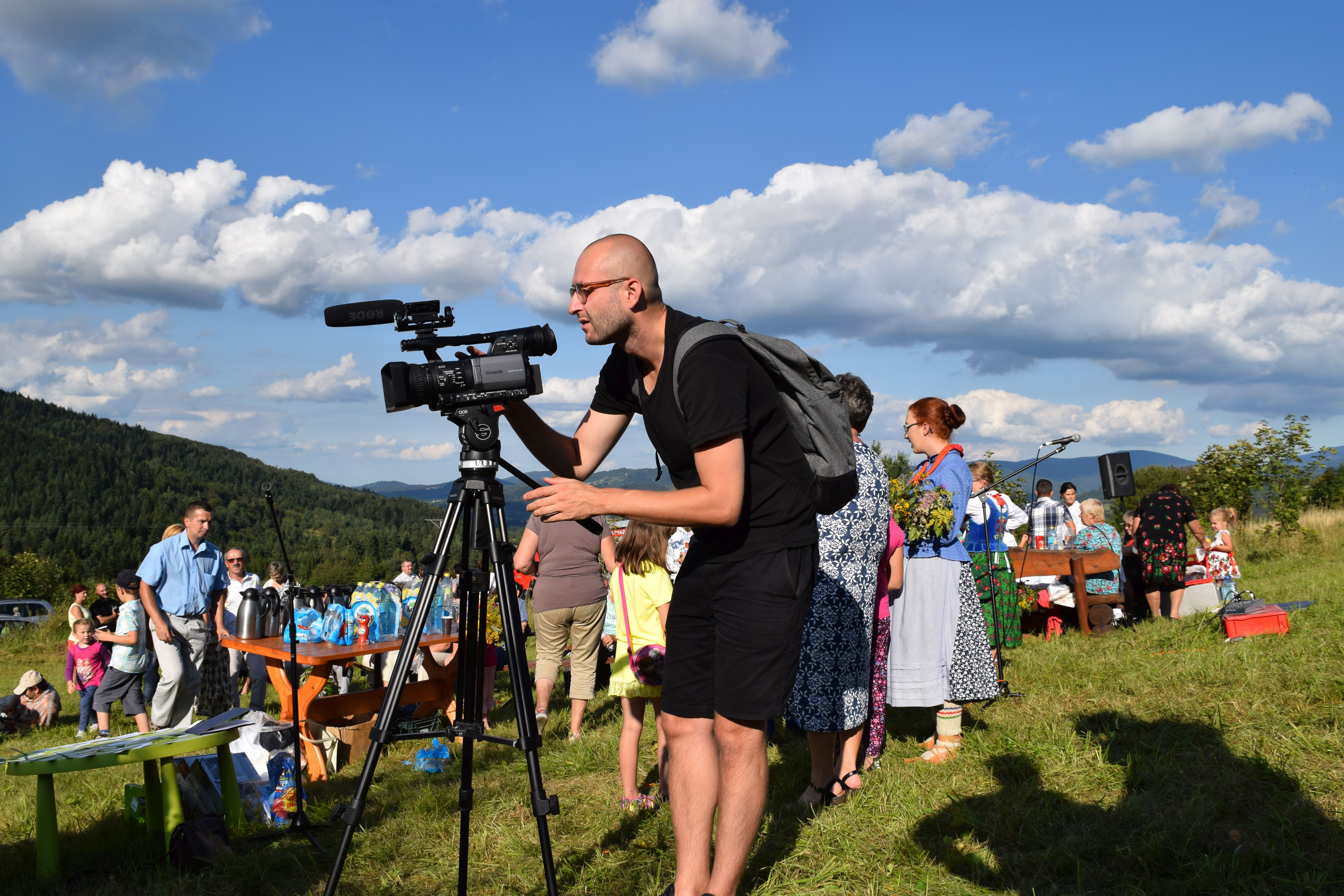
  Ethnographer filming celebrations of the Assumption of Mary, Beskids, Poland
2. Videos allow for scientific rigour when conducted by trained researchers. Videos retain sequences of observed behaviour for later scrutiny and can as a result increase quality and reliability of statements made regarding the activity.
3. Videos allow for review by both researchers and participants which can help increase the scope of interpretation.
4. Videos can be used to establish connections between abstractions and inferences and the observed activities on which they are based.

Antonius Robbens proposes that various forms of media, such as the video, are useful because of the difficulty in portraying different senses in writing, that the literary bias in ethnographic research results in a neglect of the senses. As a result, videos can help reveal previously elusive and intangible aspects of social and cultural behaviour and interaction. Videos provide an accurate recording of events while still leaving open a large scope for analytical interpretation. They provide opportunities for collaboration between researchers and participants and can serve as a valuable adjunctive tool in many types of ethnographic studies. Besides researcher-centered videos, some video ethnographers also invite participants to create videos, providing insights into their points of view and experiences.

== Important issues ==
Although there are many benefits to video ethnography, there are also important issues that arise from the use of videos. For instance, there are numerous ethical issues regarding the privacy of research participants or subjects. Schaeffer addresses the issues of voluntary consent and confidentiality of data. Voluntary consent is the control of involvement in the research lying firmly with the participant who needs complete knowledge of the research and its goals to exercise this control properly. There must also be mutual trust and respect between the researchers and the participants. Confidentiality implies the proper use of the gathered data as to maintain the highest degree of confidentiality possible while also maintaining the integrity of the research.
Schaeffer provides three requirements to prevent the misuse of ethnographic videos:

1. Having only trained professionals handle the videos during the research.
2. To be aware of the needs of the participants, the social, political and economic relevance of the data.
3. The willingness to sacrifice the use of videos unless indispensable for the collection of information.

Other issues can relate to the practical appropriateness of videos in specific projects. This takes into consideration both the project design and the field situation (i.e. the physical environment). Schaeffer concludes that videos can be useful and reliable in a variety of settings when they are properly maintained and handled.

In addition to issues relating to the creation and preservation of the video recording, its contents should be considered. To evaluate the objectivity of the research, questions of bias must be addressed. In theory, the ethnographer acts as a passive participant and captures data relating to the participants. For the format of video ethnography, it should be determined whether it is the ethnographer's perspective expressed in the video or that of the participant(s). By determining perspective, questions of why the particular event was recorded, how the participants were shown, and how this medium relates to the ethnographer's research can be answered. These issues relating to perspective have been prevalent in anthropology, and, as a result, theories of addressing bias are embedded in ethnographic discourse. Kenneth Pike considered bias of perspective and formulated the theory of Etic and emic. This concept has been further discussed and operationalized in the works of anthropologists, Marvin Harris, and Ward Goodenough.

== See also ==
- Global Lives Project, a non-profit generating video ethnography
- Close-Up Research, specialists in video and ethnographic research
- Exploring Scent as a Creative Way of Life, a science communication website providing access to ethnographic videodata from perfumery
