= Paul is dead =

Urban legend and conspiracy theory

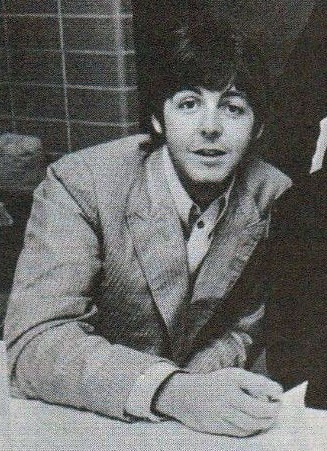
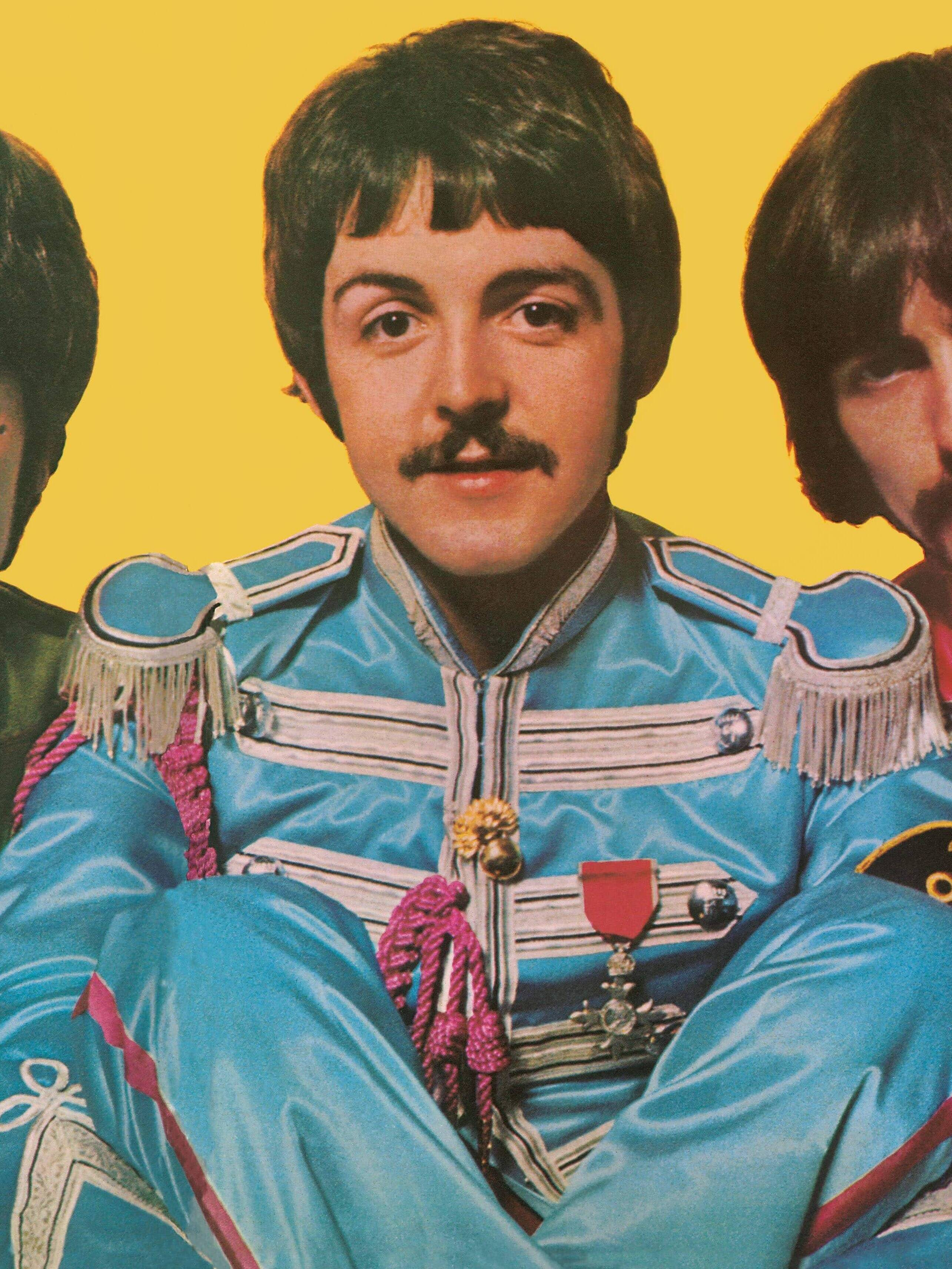
McCartney in August 1966 (left) and March 1967 (right). The urban legend suggests that McCartney died in November 1966 and was replaced by a stand-in.

"Paul is dead" is an urban legend and conspiracy theory alleging that English musician Paul McCartney of the Beatles died in 1966 and was secretly replaced by a look-alike. The rumour began circulating in 1966, gaining broad popularity in September 1969 following reports on American college campuses. Rumours declined after Life published an interview with McCartney in November 1969.

According to the story, McCartney died in a car crash, and, to spare the public from grief, the surviving Beatles, aided by Britain's MI5, replaced him with a McCartney look-alike, subsequently communicating this secret through subtle details of their albums. Proponents perceived clues among elements of Beatles songs and cover artwork; clue-hunting proved infectious, and by October 1969 had become an international phenomenon.

The phenomenon was the subject of analysis in the fields of sociology, psychology and communications during the 1970s. McCartney parodied the hoax with the title and cover art of his 1993 live album, Paul Is Live. The legend was among ten of "the world's most enduring conspiracy theories" according to Time in 2009.

== Beginnings ==
Although there had been rumours from early 1966 that Paul McCartney's health was deteriorating, reports that McCartney had died did not start circulating until September of that year. The Beatles' press officer, Tony Barrow, recounted this in his book, John, Paul, George, Ringo and Me. Fleet Street reporters started phoning Barrow early in that month, to confirm rumours regarding the Beatle's health and even a possible death, to which he replied that he had recently spoken with McCartney.

For the rest of 1966, the rumour was eclipsed by similar reports that Paul McCartney was working on a solo project and that the Beatles were splitting up, which were backed by their disappearance from the public eye and the postponement of their scheduled tours in late 1966.

In early 1967, the rumour resurfaced in London, this time claiming that Paul McCartney had been killed in a traffic accident while driving along the M1 motorway on 7 January. The rumour was acknowledged and rebutted in the February issue of The Beatles Book. McCartney then alluded to the rumour during a press conference held about the release of Sgt. Pepper's Lonely Hearts Club Band in May.

The Beatles' producer George Martin once claimed that, during the Beatles' visit to Denver, Colorado, "a number of people pretending to be Beatles" were employed by the promoters of the band's concerts in order to distract the crowds of fans from the real Beatles, while they were exiting a hotel. According to journalist Maureen O'Grady, who wrote about it in the May 1966 issue of RAVE Magazine, such a tactic was used when the Beatles first played in Baltimore, in 1964. As a result, stories began to circulate that the Beatles had sent four lookalikes to perform on stage on one of their American tours. Both Paul McCartney and George Harrison later refuted these claims.

Despite the Beatles dismissing such accusations, they soon began accompanying the notion that McCartney had died. By late 1967, it was further stated that the Beatles had covered up his death by employing a Paul McCartney impersonator to stand in for him. For example, journalist Jay Marks was attending McCartney's engagement party in 1967 when a friend of the band told him that McCartney had been replaced.

By the mid-1960s, the Beatles were known for sometimes including backmasking in their music. Analysing their lyrics for hidden meaning had also become a popular trend in the US. In November 1968, their self-titled double LP (also known as the "White Album") was released containing the track "Glass Onion". John Lennon wrote the song in response to "gobbledygook" said about Sgt. Pepper. In a later interview, he said that he was purposely confusing listeners with lines such as "the Walrus was Paul" – a reference to his song "I Am the Walrus" from the 1967 EP and album Magical Mystery Tour.

"Revolution 9" (section)
The allegedly backmasked section of "Revolution 9"

"Revolution 9" (section) (reversed)
The same section reversed, which some believe sounds like "turn me on, dead man"

On 17 September 1969, Tim Harper, an editor of the Drake Times-Delphic, the student newspaper of Drake University in Des Moines, Iowa, published an article titled "Is Beatle Paul McCartney Dead?" The article addressed a rumour being circulated on campus that cited clues from recent Beatles albums, including a message interpreted as "Turn me on, dead man", heard when the White Album track "Revolution 9" is played backwards. Also referenced was the back cover of Sgt. Pepper, where every Beatle except McCartney is photographed facing the viewer. He is wearing a black badge which appears to read "OPD" (Officially Pronounced Dead). In reality, this badge read "OPP" (Ontario Provincial Police). On the front cover, Starr in a suit looks at the flowered grave, mourning, and McCartney (in a suit) puts his hand on his shoulder. Starr looks sadly down at a tomb shaped like a P, with 4 strings looking like a bass. The front cover of Magical Mystery Tour depicts one unidentified band member in a differently coloured suit from the other three. According to music journalist Merrell Noden, Harper's Drake Times-Delphic was the first to publish an article on the "Paul is dead" theory. (Note: Writing in 1977, author Nicholas Schaffner said the theory has been traced to a student thesis at Ohio Wesleyan University and to a prank article published in the student newspaper for Northern Illinois University. The latter university eventually retracted the article in 2023 due to the false and plagiarized nature of its content, writing an apology to McCartney for their role in propagating the hoax.) Harper later said that it had become the subject of discussion among students at the start of the new academic year, and he added: "A lot of us, because of Vietnam and the so-called Establishment, were ready, willing and able to believe just about any sort of conspiracy."

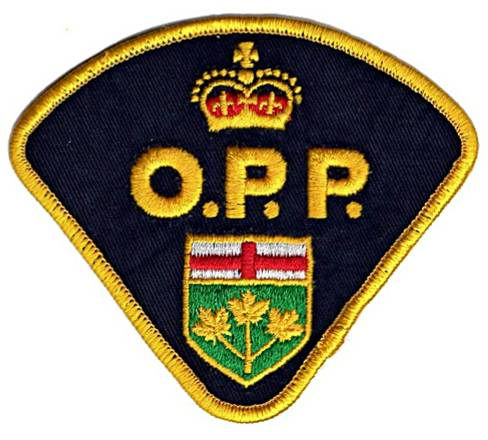
Patch worn by McCartney on Sgt. Pepper's Lonely Hearts Club Band gatefold. Originally thought to read "OPD" for Officially Pronounced Dead, the patch was confirmed in 2016 to read "OPP" for the Ontario Provincial Police."

In late September 1969, the Beatles released the album Abbey Road while they were in the process of disbanding. On 10 October, the Beatles' press officer, Derek Taylor, responded to the rumour stating:

Recently we've been getting a flood of inquiries asking about reports that Paul is dead. We've been getting questions like that for years, of course, but in the past few weeks we've been getting them at the office and home night and day. I'm even getting telephone calls from disc jockeys and others in the United States.

Throughout this period, McCartney felt isolated from his bandmates in his opposition to their choice of business manager, Allen Klein, and distraught at Lennon's private announcement that he was leaving the group. With the birth of his daughter Mary in late August, McCartney had withdrawn to focus on his family life. On 22 October, the day that the "Paul is dead" rumour became an international news story, McCartney, his wife Linda and their two daughters travelled to Scotland to spend time at his farm near Campbeltown.

== Growth ==
On 12 October 1969, a caller to Detroit radio station WKNR-FM told disc jockey Russ Gibb about the rumour and its clues. Gibb and other callers then discussed the rumour on air for the next hour, during which Gibb offered further potential clues. Two days later, The Michigan Daily published a satirical review of Abbey Road by University of Michigan student Fred LaBour, who had listened to the exchange on Gibb's show, under the headline "McCartney Dead; New Evidence Brought to Light". It identified various clues to McCartney's alleged death on Beatles album covers, particularly on the Abbey Road sleeve. LaBour later said he had invented many of the clues and was astonished when the story was picked up by newspapers across the United States. Noden writes that "Very soon, every college campus, every radio station, had a resident expert." WKNR fuelled the rumour further with its two-hour programme The Beatle Plot, which first aired on 19 October. The show – which has been called "infamous", a "fraud" and a "mockumentary" – brought enormous worldwide publicity to Gibb and WKNR.

The story was soon taken up by more mainstream radio stations in the New York area, WMCA and WABC. In the early hours of 21 October, WABC disc jockey Roby Yonge discussed the rumour on-air for over an hour before being pulled off the air for breaking format. At that time of night, WABC's signal covered a wide listening area and could be heard in 38 US states and, at times, in other countries. Although the Beatles' press office denied the rumour, McCartney's atypical withdrawal from public life contributed to its escalation. Vin Scelsa, a student broadcaster in 1969, later said that the escalation was indicative of the countercultural influence of Bob Dylan, the Beatles and the Rolling Stones, since: "Every song from them – starting about late 1966 – became a personal message, worthy of endless scrutiny ... they were guidelines on how to live your life."

WMCA dispatched Alex Bennett to the Beatles' Apple Corps headquarters in London on 23 October, to further his extended coverage of the "Paul is dead" theory. There, Ringo Starr told Bennett: "If people are gonna believe it, they're gonna believe it. I can only say it's not true." In a radio interview with John Small of WKNR, Lennon said that the rumour was "insane" but good publicity for Abbey Road. (Note: Estranged from McCartney, Lennon said: "Paul McCartney couldn't die without the world knowing it. The same as he couldn't get married ... [or] go on holiday without the world knowing it. It's just insanity – but it's a great plug for Abbey Road.") On Halloween night 1969, WKBW in Buffalo, New York, broadcast a programme titled Paul McCartney Is Alive and Well – Maybe, which analysed Beatles lyrics and other clues. The WKBW DJs concluded that the "Paul is dead" hoax was fabricated by Lennon.

Before the end of October 1969, several artists had exploited the phenomenon by releasing records based on McCartney's alleged demise. These included "The Ballad of Paul" by the Mystery Tour; "Brother Paul" by Billy Shears and the All Americans; "So Long Paul" by Werbley Finster, a pseudonym for José Feliciano; and Zacharias and His Tree People's "We're All Paul Bearers (Parts One and Two)". Another song was "Saint Paul" by Terry Knight, which had been a minor hit the previous June and was subsequently adopted by radio stations as a tribute to "the late Paul McCartney". (Note: A Capitol Records recording artist, Knight had been present during the White Album session when Starr temporarily left the band, in August 1968. In the song, the singer conveys his fears that the Beatles were about to disband.) A cover version of "Saint Paul" by New Zealand singer Shane reached the top of that nation's singles charts. According to a report in Billboard magazine in early November, Shelby Singleton Productions planned to issue a documentary LP of radio segments discussing the phenomenon. In Canada, Polydor Records exploited the rumour in their artwork for Very Together, a repackaging of the Beatles' pre-fame Hamburg recordings with Tony Sheridan, using a cover that showed four candles, one of which had just been snuffed out.

== Premise ==
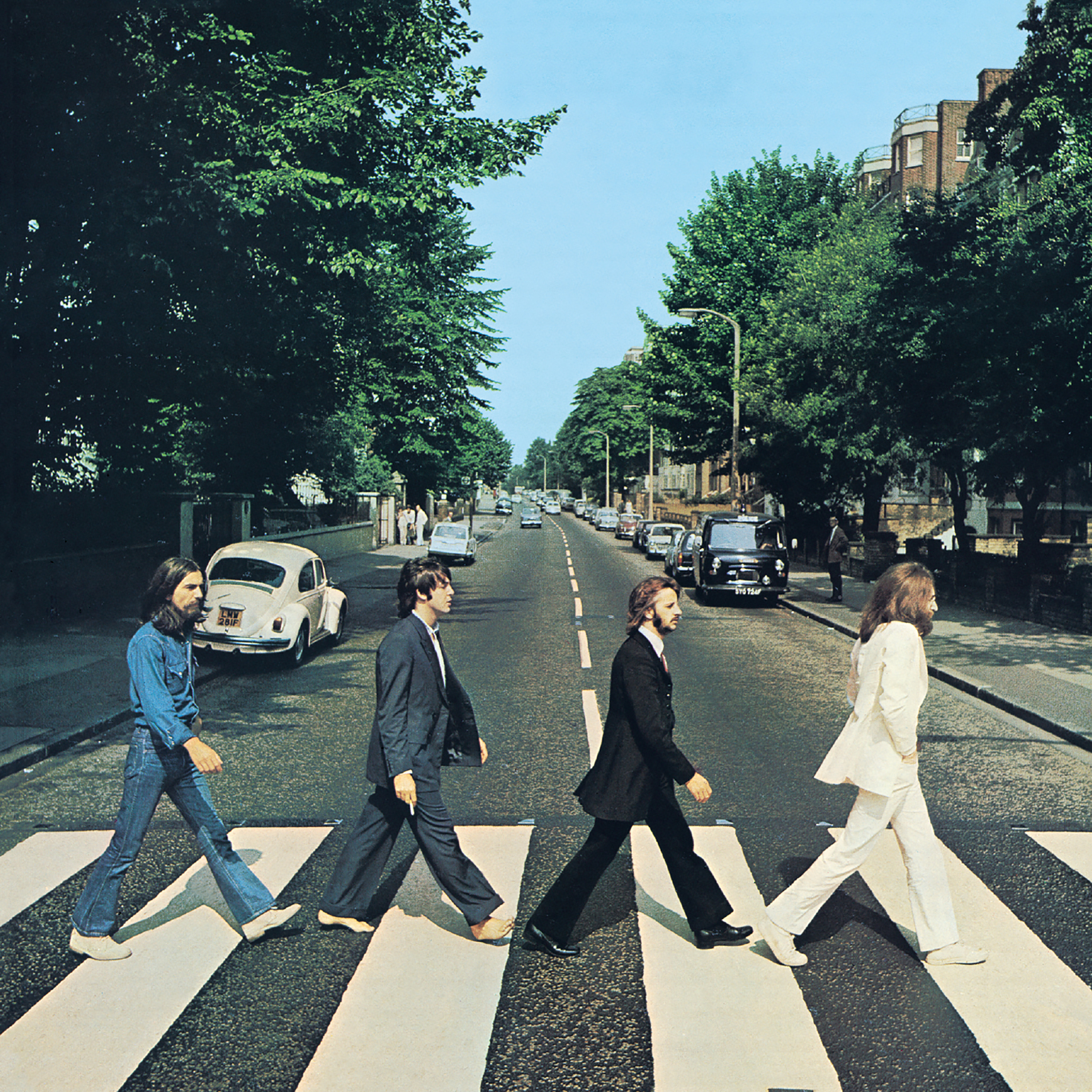
The "funeral procession" on the cover of Abbey Road

Many versions of this theory have arisen since its initial exposure to the public, but most proponents of the theory maintain that, on 9 November 1966 (or 11 September), McCartney had an argument with his bandmates during a recording session and drove away in anger. While distracted by a meter maid ("Lovely Rita"), he failed to notice the change in traffic lights ("A Day in the Life"), crashed, and was decapitated ("Don't Pass Me By"). A funeral service for McCartney was held, featuring eulogies from Harrison ("Blue Jay Way") and Starr ("Don't Pass Me By"), followed by a procession (the front cover of Abbey Road), with Lennon as the priest officiating his funeral and burying him (the alleged "I buried Paul" statement in "Strawberry Fields Forever"). To spare the public from grief, the surviving Beatles replaced McCartney with the winner of a McCartney look-alike contest. This scenario was facilitated by the Beatles' recent retirement from live performance and by their choosing to present themselves with a new image for their next album, Sgt. Pepper's Lonely Hearts Club Band, which they began recording later that month.

In LaBour's telling, the stand-in was an "orphan from Edinburgh named William Campbell" whom the Beatles then trained to impersonate McCartney. Others contended that the man's name was Bill Shepherd, later altered to Billy Shears, and the replacement was instigated by Britain's MI5 out of concern for the severe distress McCartney's death would cause the Beatles' audience. In this telling, the surviving Beatles were said to be wracked with guilt over their actions, and therefore left messages in their music and album artwork to communicate the truth to their fans.

A DJ put all those signs together: Paul with no shoes [on the cover of Abbey Road] ... and the Volkswagen Beetle. Then there was Magical Mystery Tour, where we three had red roses and he had a black one. It was just madness ... There was no way we could prove he was alive.

— Ringo Starr

Dozens of supposed clues to McCartney's death have been identified by fans and followers of the legend. These include messages perceived when listening to songs being played backwards and symbolic interpretations of both lyrics and album cover imagery. Two frequently cited examples are the suggestions that the words "I buried Paul" are spoken by Lennon in the final section of the song "Strawberry Fields Forever", which the Beatles recorded in November and December 1966 (Lennon later said that the words were actually "Cranberry sauce"), and that the words "number nine, number nine" in "Revolution 9" (from the "White Album") became "turn me on, dead man, turn me on, dead man" when played backwards. A similar reversal at the end of "I'm So Tired" (another "White Album" track) yielded "Paul is dead man, miss him, miss him, miss him...".

Another example is the interpretation of the Abbey Road album cover as depicting a funeral procession: Lennon, dressed in white, is said to symbolise the heavenly figure; Starr, dressed in black, symbolises the undertaker; George Harrison, in denim, represents the gravedigger; and McCartney, barefoot and out of step with the others, symbolises the corpse. The number plate of the white Volkswagen Beetle in the photo – containing the characters LMW 281F (mistakenly read as "28IF") – was identified as further "evidence". "28IF" represented McCartney's age "if" he had still been alive (although McCartney was 27 when the album was recorded and released), while "LMW" stood for "Linda McCartney weeps" or "Linda McCartney, widow" (although McCartney and the then-Linda Eastman had not yet met in 1966, the year of his alleged death). (Note: The fact that he would have been 27 in late 1969, rather than 28, was dismissed with the rationale that, in the Hindu tradition, infants were one year old at birth.) That the left-handed McCartney held a cigarette in his right hand was also said to support the idea that he was an impostor.

== Rebuttal ==
The magazine report that rebutted the rumour

On 21 October 1969, the Beatles' press office again issued statements denying the rumour, deeming it "a load of old rubbish" and saying that "the story has been circulating for about two years – we get letters from all sorts of nuts but Paul is still very much with us". On 24 October, BBC Radio reporter Chris Drake was granted an interview with McCartney at his farm. McCartney said that the speculation was understandable, given that he normally did "an interview a week" to ensure he remained in the news. Part of the interview was first broadcast on Radio 4, on 26 October, and subsequently on WMCA in the US. According to author John Winn, McCartney had agreed to the interview "in hopes that people hearing his voice would see the light", but the ploy failed. (Note: In the 2000 book The Beatles Anthology, McCartney says that his reaction to the rumour's growth had been: "Well, we'd better play it for all it's worth. It's publicity, isn't it?")

McCartney was secretly filmed by a CBS News crew as he worked on his farm. As in his and Linda's segment in the Beatles' promotional clip for "Something", which the couple filmed privately around this time, McCartney was unshaven and unusually scruffy-looking in his appearance. His next visitors were a reporter and photographer from Life magazine. Irate at the intrusion, he swore at the pair, threw a bucket of water over them and was captured on film attempting to hit the photographer. Fearing that the photos would damage his image, McCartney then approached the pair and agreed to pose for a photo with his family and answer the reporter's questions, in exchange for the roll of film containing the offending pictures. In Winn's description, the family portrait used for Life's cover shows McCartney no longer "shabbily attired", but "clean-shaven and casually but smartly dressed".

Following the publication of the article and the photo, in the issue dated 7 November, the rumour started to decline. In the interview, McCartney said the rumour was "bloody stupid" and went on to say:

Perhaps the rumour started because I haven't been much in the press lately. I have done enough press for a lifetime, and I don't have anything to say these days. I am happy to be with my family and I will work when I work. I was switched on for ten years and I never switched off. Now I am switching off whenever I can. I would rather be a little less famous these days.

== Aftermath ==
In November 1969, Capitol Records sales managers reported a significant increase in sales of Beatles catalogue albums, attributed to the rumour. Rocco Catena, Capitol's vice-president of national merchandising, estimated that "this is going to be the biggest month in history in terms of Beatles sales". The rumour benefited the commercial performance of Abbey Road in the US, where it comfortably outsold all of the band's previous albums. Sgt. Pepper and Magical Mystery Tour, both of which had been off the charts since February, re-entered the Billboard Top LPs chart, peaking at number 101 and number 109, respectively.

A television special dedicated to "Paul is dead" was broadcast on WOR in New York on 30 November. Titled Paul McCartney: The Complete Story, Told for the First and Last Time, it was set in a courtroom and hosted by celebrity lawyer F. Lee Bailey, who cross-examined LaBour, Gibb and other proponents of the theory, and heard opposing views from "witnesses" such as McCartney's friend Peter Asher, brother Mike McCartney and Allen Klein. Bailey left it to the viewer to determine a conclusion. Before the recording, LaBour told Bailey that his article had been intended as a joke, to which Bailey sighed and replied, "Well, we have an hour of television to do; you're going to have to go along with this."

It was a bit weird meeting people shortly after that, because they'd be looking at the back of my ears, looking a bit through me. And it was weird doing the "I really am him" stuff.

— Paul McCartney

McCartney returned to London in December. Bolstered by Linda's support, he began recording his debut solo album at his home in St John's Wood. Titled McCartney, and recorded without his bandmates' knowledge, it was "one of the best-kept secrets in rock history" until shortly before its release in April 1970, according to author Nicholas Schaffner, and led to the announcement of the Beatles' break-up. In his 1971 song "How Do You Sleep?", in which he attacked McCartney's character, Lennon described the theorists as "freaks" who "was right when they said you was dead". The rumour was also cited in the hoax surrounding the Canadian band Klaatu, after a January 1977 review of their debut album, 3:47 EST, sparked rumours that the group were in fact the Beatles. In one telling, this theory contended that the album had been recorded in late 1966 but then mislaid until 1975, at which point Lennon, Harrison and Starr elected to issue it in McCartney's memory.

LaBour later became notable as the bassist for the western swing group Riders in the Sky, which he co-founded in 1977. In 2008, he joked that his success as a musician had extended his fifteen minutes of fame for his part in the rumour to "seventeen minutes". In 2015, he told The Detroit News that he is still periodically contacted by conspiracy theorists who have attempted to present him with supposed new developments on the McCartney rumours.

== Analysis and legacy ==
Author Peter Doggett writes that, while he thinks the theory behind "Paul is dead" defied logic, its popularity was understandable in a climate where citizens were faced with conspiracy theories insisting that the assassination of President John F. Kennedy in 1963 was in fact a coup d'état. Schaffner said that, given its origins as an item of gossip and intrigue generated by a select group in the "Beatles cult", "Paul is dead" serves as "a genuine folk tale of the mass communications era". He also described it as "the most monumental hoax since Orson Welles' War of the Worlds broadcast persuaded thousands of panicky New Jerseyites that Martian invaders were in the vicinity".

In his book Revolution in the Head, Ian MacDonald says that the Beatles were partly responsible for the phenomenon due to their incorporation of "random lyrics and effects", particularly in the White Album track "Glass Onion" in which Lennon invited clue-hunting by including references to other Beatles songs. MacDonald groups it with the "psychic epidemics" that were encouraged by the rock audience's use of hallucinogenic drugs and which escalated with Charles Manson's homicidal interpretation of the White Album and Mark David Chapman's murder of Lennon in 1980.

During the 1970s, the phenomenon became a subject of academic study in America in the fields of sociology, psychology and communications. Among sociological studies, Barbara Suczek recognised it as, in Schaffner's description, a contemporary reading of the "archetypal myth wherein the beautiful youth dies and is resurrected as a god". Psychologists Ralph Rosnow and Gary Fine attributed its popularity partly to the shared, vicarious experience of searching for clues without consequence for the participants. They also said that for a generation distrustful of the media following the Warren Commission's report, it was able to thrive amid a climate informed by "The credibility gap of Lyndon Johnson's presidency, the widely circulated rumors after the Martin Luther King Jr. and Robert F. Kennedy assassinations, as well as attacks on the leading media sources by the yippies and Spiro Agnew".

American social critic Camille Paglia locates the "Paul is dead" phenomenon to the Ancient Greek tradition symbolised by Adonis and Antinous, as represented in the cult of rock music's "pretty, long-haired boys who mesmerize both sexes", and she adds: "It's no coincidence that it was Paul McCartney, the 'cutest' and most girlish of the Beatles, who inspired a false rumor that swept the world in 1969 that he was dead."

"Paul is dead" has continued to inspire analysis into the 21st century, with published studies by Andru J. Reeve, Nick Kollerstrom and Brian Moriarty, among others, and exploitative works in the mediums of mockumentary and documentary film. Writing in 2016, Beatles biographer Steve Turner said, "the theory still has the power to flare back into life." He cited a 2009 Wired Italia magazine article that featured an analysis by two forensic research consultants who compared selected photographs of McCartney taken before and after his alleged death by measuring features of the skull. According to the scientists' findings, the man shown in the post-November 1966 images was not the same. (Note: In his article on the legacy of "Paul is dead", for Dawn in January 2017, Anis Shivani wrote that the narrative has grown, in the manner of JFK's assassination, to incorporate related conspiracy theories. In this expanded narrative, Lennon's murder in 1980, Harrison's near-fatal stabbing in 1999, and the death of Beatles associate Mal Evans in 1976 are all credited to forces protecting the "truth" behind "Paul is dead".)

Similar rumours concerning other celebrities have been circulated, including the unsubstantiated allegation that Canadian singer Avril Lavigne died in 2003 and was replaced by a person named Melissa Vandella. In an article on the latter phenomenon, The Guardian described the 1969 McCartney hoax as "Possibly the best known example" of a celebrity being the focus of "a (completely unverified) cloning conspiracy theory". In 2009, Time magazine included "Paul is dead" in its feature on ten of "the world's most enduring conspiracy theories".

== In popular culture ==
There have been many references to the legend in popular culture, including the following examples.

- The June 1970 issue of the DC Comics title Batman (#222) had a story titled "Dead ... Till Proven Alive" in which it was rumoured that Saul from the band the Oliver Twists was deceased and replaced with a double. On the cover of the comic book, Robin is holding an album that mimics the back of Sgt. Pepper's Lonely Hearts Club Band.
- The 1972 National Lampoon comedy album Radio Dinner has several announced "clues" placed throughout, including backmasked segments and notes in the album's gatefold, all parodying the hoax.
- In the Rutles' 1978 television film satirising the Beatles' history, All You Need Is Cash, the identity of the alleged dead band member was transferred to the George Harrison character, Stig O'Hara, who was supposed to have died "in a flash fire at a water bed shop" and been replaced by a Madame Tussauds wax model. Building on Harrison's reputation as the "Quiet Beatle", the "Stig is dead" theory was supported by his lack of dialogue in the film and clues such as his trouser-less appearance on the cover of the Rutles' Shabby Road album.
- McCartney titled his 1993 live album Paul Is Live in reference to the hoax. He also presented it in a sleeve that parodied the Abbey Road cover and its clues.
- The 1995 video for "Free as a Bird" – a song recorded by Lennon in the late 1970s and completed by McCartney, Harrison and Starr for the band's Anthology project – references "Paul is dead", among other myths relating to the Beatles' impact during the 1960s. According to author Gary Burns, the video indulges in the same "semiological excess" as the 1969 hoax and thereby "spoof[s]" obsessive clue-hunting.
- In 2010, American author Alan Goldsher published the mashup novel Paul Is Undead: The British Zombie Invasion, which depicts all of the Beatles as zombies except Ringo Starr.
- Paul McCartney Really Is Dead: The Last Testament of George Harrison is a 2010 mockumentary directed by Joel Gilbert that purports to tell the story of George Harrison, believing himself to be on his deathbed after being stabbed on 30 December 1999, revealing that McCartney had died in a car crash with a girl named Rita and that British intelligence agencies had orchestrated a coverup through which he was replaced by a lookalike. The film is narrated by a voice actor purporting to be George Harrison, describing over archival footage and reenactment the clues left behind in songs and album art that McCartney was dead.
- In 2015, the indie rock band EL VY released a song called "Paul Is Alive", which contains lyrics referencing Beatlemania and partly addresses the 1969 rumour.
- A 2018 comedy short film, Paul Is Dead, depicts a version of events where McCartney dies during a musical retreat and is replaced by a look-alike named Billy Shears.

== See also ==
- Outline of the Beatles
- The Beatles timeline

== Bibliography ==
- The Beatles (2000). The Beatles Anthology. San Francisco, CA: Chronicle Books. ISBN 0-8118-2684-8.
- Burns, Gary (2000). "Refab Four: Beatles for Sale in the Age of Music Video". In Inglis, Ian (ed.). The Beatles, Popular Music and Society: A Thousand Voices. New York, NY: St. Martin's Press. ISBN 978-0-312-22236-9.
- Castleman, Harry; Podrazik, Walter J. (1976). All Together Now: The First Complete Beatles Discography 1961–1975. New York, NY: Ballantine Books. ISBN 0-345-25680-8.
- Clayson, Alan (2003). Paul McCartney. London: Sanctuary. ISBN 1-86074-482-6.
- Doggett, Peter (2011). You Never Give Me Your Money: The Beatles After the Breakup. New York, NY: It Books. ISBN 978-0-06-177418-8.
- Draper, Jason (2008). A Brief History of Album Covers. London: Flame Tree Publishing. ISBN 978-1-84786-211-2.
- Gould, Jonathan (2007). Can't Buy Me Love: The Beatles, Britain and America. London: Piatkus. ISBN 978-0-7499-2988-6.
- Hoffmann, Frank W.; Bailey, William G. (1990). Arts & Entertainment Fads. Binghamton, NY: The Haworth Press. ISBN 0-86656-881-6.
- MacDonald, Ian (1998). Revolution in the Head: The Beatles' Records and the Sixties. London: Pimlico. ISBN 978-0-7126-6697-8.
- McKinney, Devin (2003). Magic Circles: The Beatles in Dream and History. Cambridge, MA: Harvard University Press. ISBN 0-674-01202-X.
- Miles, Barry (1997). Paul McCartney: Many Years from Now. New York, NY: Henry Holt & Company. ISBN 978-0-8050-5248-0.
- Miles, Barry (2001). The Beatles Diary Volume 1: The Beatles Years. London: Omnibus Press. ISBN 0-7119-8308-9.
- Patterson, R. Gary (1998). The Walrus Was Paul: The Great Beatle Death Clues. New York, NY: Fireside. ISBN 0-684-85062-1.
- Reeve, Andru J. (1994). Turn Me On, Dead Man: The Beatles and the "Paul-Is-Dead" Hoax. Ann Arbor, MI: Popular Culture Ink. ISBN 1560750359.
- Rodriguez, Robert (2010). Fab Four FAQ 2.0: The Beatles' Solo Years, 1970–1980. Milwaukee, WI: Backbeat Books. ISBN 978-1-4165-9093-4.
- Schaffner, Nicholas (1978). The Beatles Forever. New York, NY: McGraw-Hill. ISBN 0-07-055087-5.
- Sounes, Howard (2010). Fab: An Intimate Life of Paul McCartney. London: HarperCollins. ISBN 978-0-00-723705-0.
- Turner, Steve (2016). Beatles '66: The Revolutionary Year. New York, NY: Ecco. ISBN 978-0-06-247558-9.
- Winn, John C. (2009). That Magic Feeling: The Beatles' Recorded Legacy, Volume Two, 1966–1970. New York, NY: Three Rivers Press. ISBN 978-0-307-45239-9.
