= Paul Is Dead (comics) =

Graphic novel by Paolo Barron

- Date: 2020
- Page count: 116 pages
- Publisher: Image Comics
- Writer: Paolo Barron
- Artist: Ernesto Carbonetti

Paul Is Dead is an alternate history graphic novel written by Paolo Barron and drawn by Ernesto Carbonetti. It was translated from Italian and published in English by Image Comics in a single volume on 3 June 2020.

The novel is a work of speculative fiction inspired by the enduring "Paul is dead" urban myth, which claims that Beatles member Paul McCartney died in 1966 and was replaced by a look-alike.

== Synopsis ==
In November 1966, Paul McCartney is growing disillusioned with both fame and the direction of the Beatles. He flies into a rage at Abbey Road Studios when he finds John Lennon upside-down hanging from the studio ceiling in order to capture the desired vocal effect for "Tomorrow Never Knows", decrying the band as having becoming a circus and storming out. On the way home from the studio McCartney crashes his car into a tree and is seemingly incinerated. The band's manager Brian Epstein breaks the news to a devastated Lennon and says the government have taken the body and are suppressing the news, worried McCartney's popularity and death will lead to a string of suicides among Beatles fans.

Lennon then informs band-mates George Harrison and Ringo Starr. The trio grow suspicious about the supposed death and begin investigating their friend's affairs. While going through his band-mate's flat Lennon receives a visit from McCartney, who is alive and well. He explains that he faked his death with the collusion of Epstein. Lennon is initially enraged and punches McCartney before going on an LSD trip. After McCartney airs his grievances he rejoins the band at Abbey Road, where the other members forgive him and roundly mock the idea of replacing him with a double.

Parallel to the events a McCartney lookalike called William Shears is evaluated by shadowy figures, who comment on his uncanny similarity to the singer while encouraging him to switch to playing guitar left-handed, work on his piano playing and improve his voice - before appearing onstage at a celebrity lookalike contest.

== Allusions ==
As noted in the novel's credits and the epilogue by writer Barron, Paul Is Dead contains several references to the Beatles' music and history. The lyrics of "The Fool on the Hill" and "I am the Walrus" are quoted in dialogue while Lennon is shown playing "Strawberry Fields Forever" to a moved George Martin. The unconventional recording method for Lennon's vocals on "Tomorrow Never Knows" was explored by the musician and recording engineer Geoff Emerick but in reality was not actually used. Pink Floyd feature in a brief cameo in a fictionalised scene.

== Reviews ==
Writing for Broken Frontier, John Trigonis was positive about the novel, especially Carbonetti's "magical" art. Edward Haynes gave a more mixed view for Multiversity Comics, feeling that the plot lost its way after the opening section.
