= Sarah Pink =

Ethnographer and social science researcher

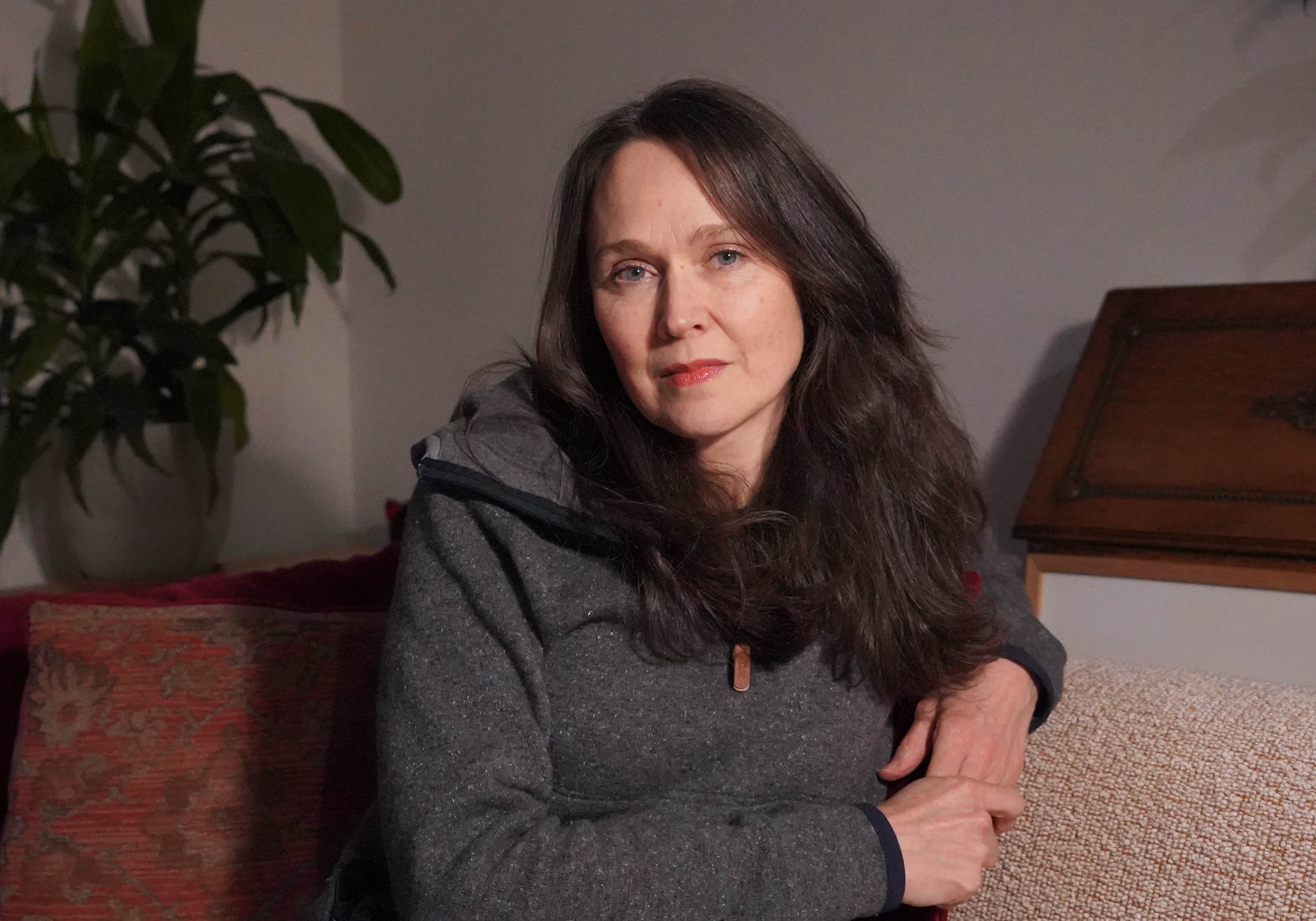
- Born: 12 April 1966 (age 60)

Academic background
- Education: University of Manchester; University of Kent

Academic work
- Institutions: Monash University
- Main interests: Ethnography visual research methods

Sarah Pink (born 12 April 1966) is a British-born social scientist, ethnographer and social anthropologist, now based in Australia, known for her work using visual research methods such as photography, images, video and other media for ethnographic research in digital media and new technologies. She has an international reputation for her work in visual ethnography and her book Doing Visual Ethnography, first published in 2001 and now in its 4th edition, is used in anthropology, sociology, cultural studies, photographic studies and media studies. She has designed or undertaken ethnographic research in the UK, Spain, Australia, Sweden, Brazil and Indonesia.

== Education and career ==
Pink holds a Master of Arts (M.A.) in visual anthropology from the University of Manchester (1990) and a PhD, awarded 1996, in social anthropology, on women and bullfighting in Southern Spain, from the University of Kent in the United Kingdom. From 2000 she was Professor of Social Sciences, Loughborough University, UK and from 2010 to 2011 she was visiting professor at the Open University of Catalonia in Barcelona, Spain. In 2012 she moved to Melbourne, Australia as Distinguished Professor for Design and Media Ethnography and Director of the Digital Ethnography Research Centre at RMIT University in Melbourne, Australia. Pink currently works at Monash University in Melbourne, Australia where is she is director of the Emerging Technologies Research Lab and chief investigator in the ARC Centre of Excellence for Automated Decision-Making and Society. She also holds visiting professorships in Loughborough University, UK and Halmstad University, Sweden.

She received the 2016 Association of Researchers in Construction Management (ARCOM) CIOB Award for the Best International Paper for the paper Using Participatory Video to Understand Subcontracted Construction Workers’ Safety Rule Violations. The documentary Laundry Lives: Everyday Life & Environmental Sustainability in Indonesia directed by Sarah Pink and Nadia Astari was selected for the 9th Taiwan International Ethnographic Film Festival (TIEFF) in 2017.

Pink was elected as a Fellow of the Academy of the Social Sciences in Australia in 2019. She was awarded an Australian Laureate Fellowship in 2023 for her research into the digital economy and net zero carbon transition.

== Research interests ==
Pink's work focuses on visual methods in ethnographic field research, digital media, everyday life, consumption, autonomous driving and sustainability. She has developed new design anthropology techniques, including design ethnographic videomaking and she works on interdisciplinary projects across design, engineering and creative practice disciplines. She is part of the Future Anthropologists Network of the European Association of Social Anthropologists (EASA). As well as her textbooks on visual ethnography she has published a textbook on sensory ethnography which looks at the ways that smell, taste, touch and vision can be interconnected and interrelated within research.

Her current and recent projects use visual, sensory and design ethnographic techniques to investigate emerging intelligent technologies, automation, data, digital futures, safety and design for wellbeing including autonomous driving vehicles, Mobility as a Service, digital energy futures, self tracking and wearable technologies, smart phone and personal technology futures, digital technology use in everyday life, and health care.

== Selected publications ==
Pink, S. (2021) Doing Visual Ethnography. Revised and expanded 4th edition, London: Sage, ISBN 9781529743975

Akama, Y., S. Pink and S. Sumartojo (2018) Uncertainty and Possibility: new approaches to future making. London: Bloomsbury.

Pink, S., K. Leder Mackley, R. Morosanu, V. Mitchell and T. Bhamra (2017) Making Homes: ethnographies and designs. Oxford: Bloomsbury

Pink, S. (2015) Doing Sensory Ethnography, 2nd edition, London: Sage, ISBN 9781446287590

Pink, S. (2012) Situating Everyday Life: Practices and Places, London: Sage.

Documentary: Laundry lives: Everyday Life & Environmental Sustainability in Indonesia
