= Ethnography =

Systematic study of people and cultures

Ethnography is a branch of anthropology and the systematic study of individual cultures. It explores cultural phenomena from the point of view of the subject of the study. Ethnography is also a type of social research that involves examining the behavior of the participants in a given social situation and understanding the group members' own interpretation of such behavior.

Ethnography is a form of inquiry that relies heavily on participant observation. In this method, the researcher participates in the setting or with the people being studied, often in a marginal role, to document detailed patterns of social interaction and the perspectives of participants within their local contexts. It had its origin in social and cultural anthropology in the early twentieth century, but has since then, spread to other social science disciplines, such as in sociology.

Ethnographers mainly use qualitative methods, though they may also include quantitative data. The typical ethnography is a holistic study and so includes a brief history, and an analysis of the terrain, the climate, and the habitat. A wide range of groups and organisations have been studied by this method, including traditional communities, youth gangs, religious cults, and organisations of various kinds. While, traditionally, ethnography has relied on the physical presence of the researcher in a setting, there is research using the label that has relied on interviews or documents, sometimes to investigate events in the past such as the NASA Challenger disaster. There is also ethnography done in "virtual" or online environments, sometimes labelled netnography or cyber-ethnography.

== Origins ==
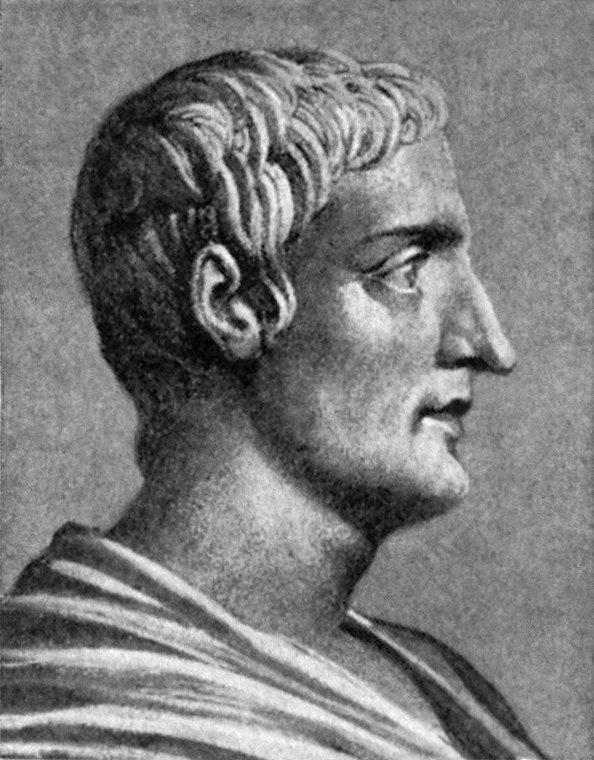
The Roman historian Publius Cornelius Tacitus was a prolific ethnographer in antiquity.

The term ethnography is from Greek (ἔθνος éthnos "folk, people, nation" and γράφω gráphō "I write") and encompasses the ways in which ancient authors described and analyzed foreign cultures. Anthony Kaldellis loosely suggests the Odyssey as a starting point for ancient ethnography, while noting that Herodotus' Histories is the usual starting point; while Edith Hall has argued that Homeric poetry lacks "the coherence and vigour of ethnological science". From Herodotus forward, ethnography was a mainstay of ancient historiography.

Tacitus has ethnographies in the Agricola, Histories, and Germania. Germania "stands as the sole surviving full-scale monograph by a classical author on an alien people." Ethnography formed a relatively coherent subgenre in Byzantine literature.

=== Development as a science ===
While ethnography ("ethnographic writing") was widely practiced in antiquity, ethnography as a science (cf. ethnology) did not exist in the ancient world. There is no ancient term or concept applicable to ethnography, and those writers probably did not consider the study of other cultures as a distinct mode of inquiry from history. Gerhard Friedrich Müller developed the concept of ethnography as a separate discipline whilst participating in the Second Kamchatka Expedition (1733–43) as a professor of history and geography. Whilst involved in the expedition, he differentiated Völker-Beschreibung as a distinct area of study. This became known as "ethnography", following the introduction of the Greek neologism ethnographia by Johann Friedrich Schöpperlin and the German variant by A. F. Thilo in 1767. August Ludwig von Schlözer and Christoph Wilhelm Jacob Gatterer of the University of Göttingen introduced the term into the academic discourse in an attempt to reform the contemporary understanding of world history.

== Features of ethnographic research ==
According to Dewan (2018), the researcher is not looking for generalizing the findings; rather, they are considering it in reference to the context of the situation. In this regard, the best way to integrate ethnography in quantitative research would be to use it to discover relationships and then use the resultant data to test and explain the empirical assumptions.

In ethnography, the researcher gathers what is available, what is normal, what it is that people do, what they say, and how they work.

Ethnography can also be used in other methodological frameworks, for instance, an action research program of study where one of the goals is to change and improve the situation.

Ethnographic research is a fundamental methodology in cultural ecology, development studies, and feminist geography. In addition, it has gained importance in social, political, cultural, and nature-society geography. Ethnography is an effective methodology in qualitative geographic research that focuses on people's perceptions and experiences and their traditionally place-based immersion within a social group.

== Data collection methods ==
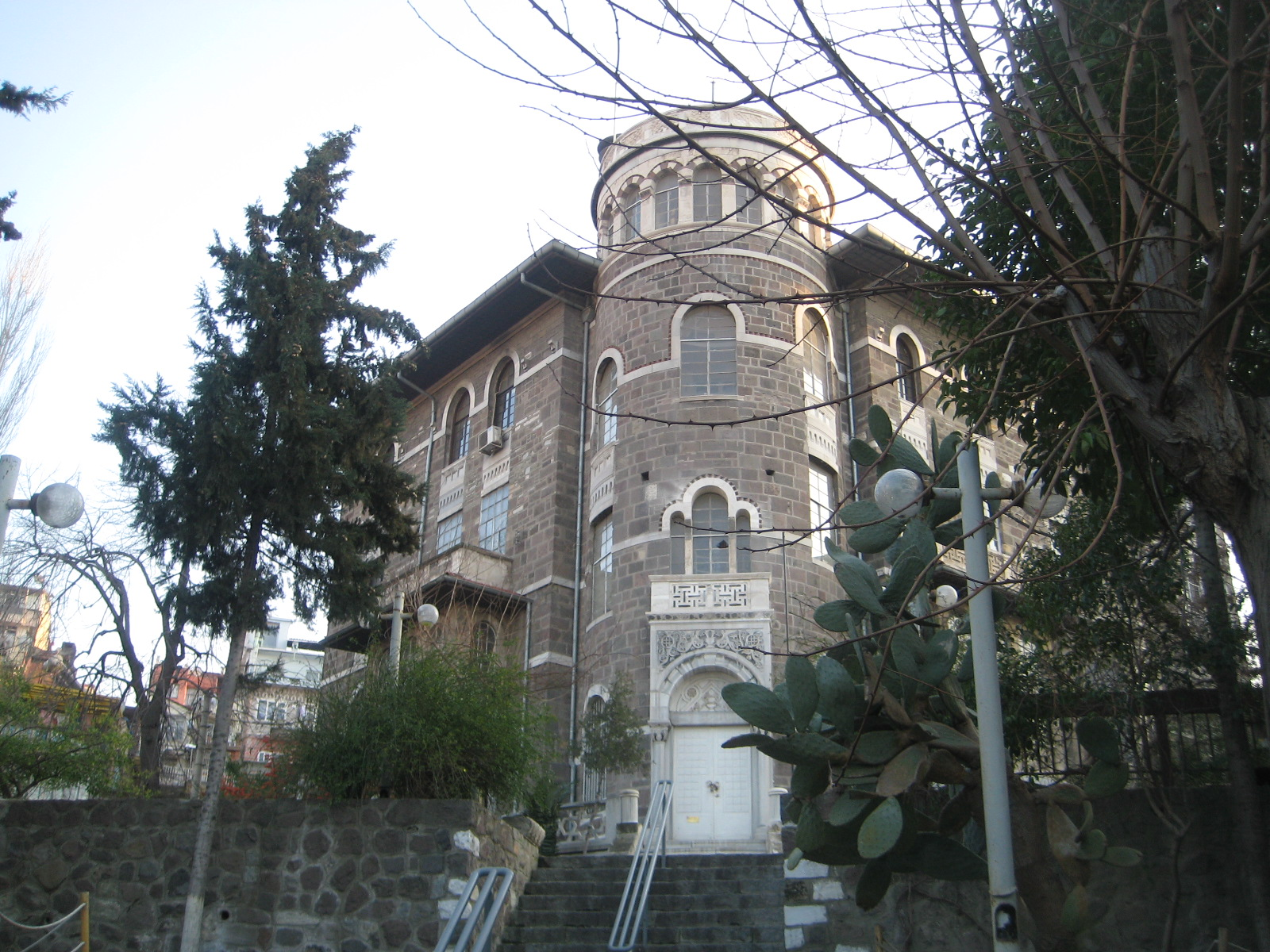
İzmir Ethnography Museum in İzmir, Turkey, from the courtyard

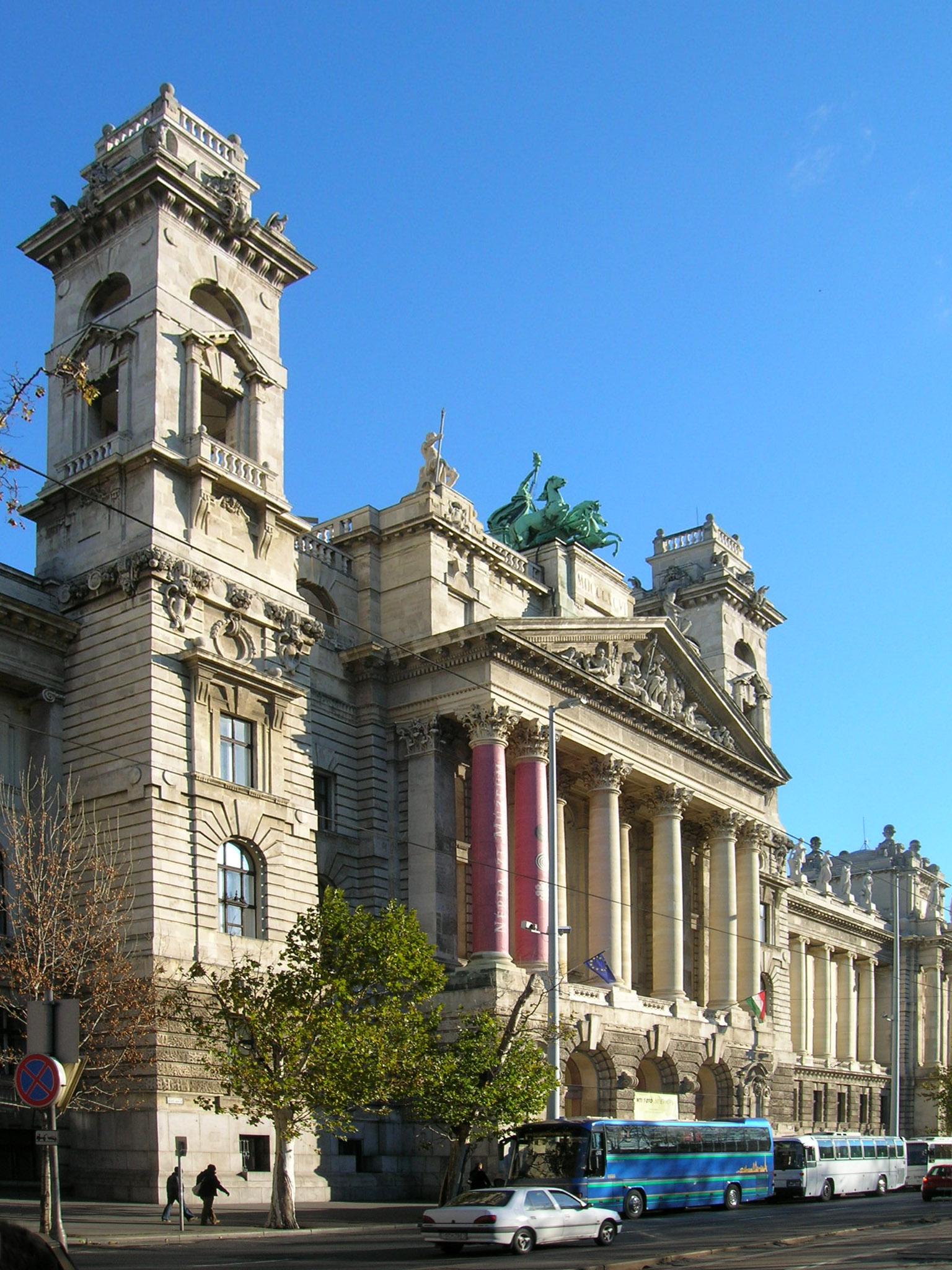
Ethnography museum, Budapest, Hungary

According to John Brewer, a leading social scientist, data collection methods are meant to capture the "social meanings and ordinary activities" of people (informants) in "naturally occurring settings" that are commonly referred to as "the field". The goal is to collect data in such a way that the researcher imposes a minimal amount of personal bias in the data. Multiple methods of data collection may be employed to facilitate a relationship that allows for a more personal and in-depth portrait of the informants and their community. These can include participant observation, field notes, interviews and surveys, as well as various visual methods.

Interviews are often taped and later transcribed, allowing the interview to proceed unimpaired of note-taking, but with all information available later for full analysis. Secondary research and document analysis are also used to provide insight into the research topic. In the past, kinship charts were commonly used to "discover logical patterns and social structure in non-Western societies". In the 21st century, anthropology focuses more on the study of people in urban settings and the use of kinship charts is seldom employed.

In order to make the data collection and interpretation transparent, researchers creating ethnographies often attempt to be "reflexive". Reflexivity refers to the researcher's aim "to explore the ways in which [the] researcher's involvement with a particular study influences, acts upon and informs such research".[Marvasti, Amir & Gubrium, Jaber. 2023. Crafting Ethnographic Fieldwork: Sites, Selves & Social Worlds. Routledge. Despite these attempts of reflexivity, no researcher can be totally unbiased. This factor has provided a basis to criticize ethnography.

Traditionally, the ethnographer focuses attention on a community, selecting knowledgeable informants who know the activities of the community well. These informants are typically asked to identify other informants who represent the community, often using snowball or chain sampling. This process is often effective in revealing common cultural denominators connected to the topic being studied. Ethnography relies greatly on up-close, personal experience. Participation, rather than just observation, is one of the keys to this process. Ethnography is very useful in social research.

An inevitability during ethnographic participation is that the researcher experiences at least some resocialization. In other words, the ethnographer to some extent "becomes" what they are studying. For instance, an ethnographer may become skilled at a work activity that they are studying; they may become members of a particular religious group they are interested in studying; or they may even inhabit a familial role in a community they are staying with. Robert M. Emerson, Rachel Fretz, and Linda Shaw summarize this idea in their book Writing Ethnographic Field Notes using a common metaphor: "the fieldworker cannot and should not attempt to be a fly on the wall."

Ybema et al. (2010) examine the ontological and epistemological presuppositions underlying ethnography. Ethnographic research can range from a realist perspective, in which behavior is observed, to a constructivist perspective where understanding is socially constructed by the researcher and subjects. Research can range from an objectivist account of fixed, observable behaviors to an interpretive narrative describing "the interplay of individual agency and social structure." Critical theory researchers address "issues of power within the researcher-researched relationships and the links between knowledge and power."

Another form of data collection is that of the "image". The image is the projection that an individual puts on an object or abstract idea. An image can be contained within the physical world through a particular individual's perspective, primarily based on that individual's past experiences. One example of an image is how an individual views a novel after completing it. The physical entity that is the novel contains a specific image in the perspective of the interpreting individual and can only be expressed by the individual in the terms of "I can tell you what an image is by telling you what it feels like." The idea of an image relies on the imagination and has been seen to be utilized by children in a very spontaneous and natural manner. Effectively, the idea of the image is a primary tool for ethnographers to collect data. The image presents the perspective, experiences, and influences of an individual as a single entity and in consequence, the individual will always contain this image in the group under study.

== Interview types ==
One possible ethnographic method is interviewing. However, there are different classifications and types of interviews ethnographers may use.

There are informal interviews which don't have much structure to them. During informal interviews, the researcher must remember conversations they hear. However, the goal isn't to memorize conversations word-for-word. Instead, the goal is to authentically recreate the meaning and tone of the conversation. One benefit that Jon Swain and Brendan King convey about the informal interview, is that there is a greater ease in communication and the participant feels less like they must perform. On the other hand, though, there are also aspects to watch out for while informal interviewing. Swain and King also mention the possibility of unreliable memory and researcher bias.

The next type of interview is the unstructured interview. An unstructured interview is based on a plan that the researcher keeps in mind. During this type of interview, the researcher sits down with the participant for a period of time and the participant knows that they are being actively interviewed.

Another type of interview is the semi-structured interview. Semi-structured interviews are also ones where the interview actually sits down with the participants. However, in a semi-structured interview, the interviews utilizes an interview guide. An interview guide is a written list of questions that need to be covered over the course of the interview.

Finally, there are structured interviews where people are asked to as closely identical to a set of stimuli as they can. One example of this is a self-administered questionnaire.

== Differences across disciplines ==
The ethnographic method is used across a range of different disciplines, primarily by anthropologists/ethnologists but also occasionally by sociologists. Cultural studies, occupational therapy, economics, social work, education, design, psychology, computer science, human factors and ergonomics, ethnomusicology, folkloristics, religious studies, geography, history, linguistics, communication studies, performance studies, advertising, accounting research, nursing, urban planning, usability, political science, social movement, and criminology are other fields which have made use of ethnography.

=== Cultural and social anthropology ===
Cultural anthropology and social anthropology were developed around ethnographic research and their canonical texts, which are mostly ethnographies: e.g. Argonauts of the Western Pacific (1922) by Bronisław Malinowski, Ethnologische Excursion in Johore (1875) by Nicholas Miklouho-Maclay, Coming of Age in Samoa (1928) by Margaret Mead, The Nuer (1940) by E. E. Evans-Pritchard, Naven (1936, 1958) by Gregory Bateson, or "The Lele of the Kasai" (1963) by Mary Douglas. Cultural and social anthropologists today place a high value on doing ethnographic research. The typical ethnography is a document written about a particular people, almost always based at least in part on emic views of where the culture begins and ends. Using language or community boundaries to bound the ethnography is common. Ethnographies are also sometimes called "case studies". Ethnographers study and interpret culture, its universalities, and its variations through the ethnographic study based on fieldwork. An ethnography is a specific kind of written observational science which provides an account of a particular culture, society, or community. The fieldwork usually involves spending a year or more in another society, living with the local people and learning about their ways of life. Ruth Fulton Benedict uses examples of Ethnography in her series of field work that began in 1922 of Serrano, of the Zuni in 1924, the Cochiti in 1925 and the Pina in 1926. All being people she wished to study for her anthropological data. Benedict's experiences with the Southwest Zuni pueblo is to be considered the basis of her formative fieldwork. By studying the culture on their own terms, she discovered the culture relativism that would be considered her personalized unique approach to the study of anthropology using ethnographic techniques.

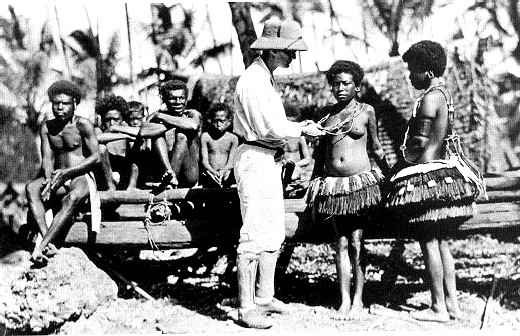
Bronisław Malinowski among Trobriand tribe

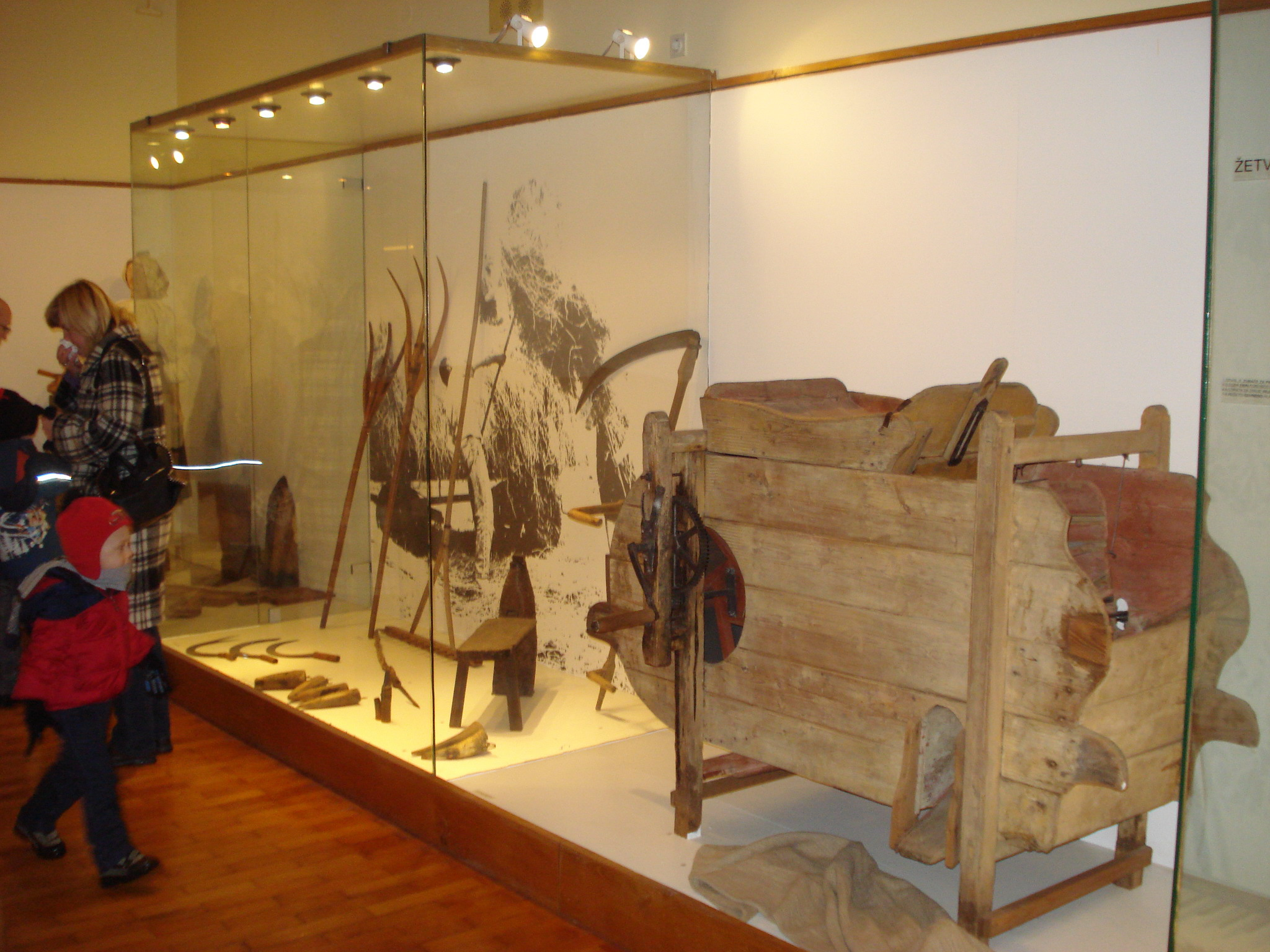
Part of the ethnographic collection of the Međimurje County Museum in Croatia

A typical ethnography attempts to be holistic and typically follows an outline to include a brief history of the culture in question, an analysis of the physical geography or terrain inhabited by the people under study, including climate, and often including what biological anthropologists call habitat. Folk notions of botany and zoology are presented as ethnobotany and ethno-zoology alongside references from the formal sciences. Material culture, technology, and means of subsistence are usually treated next, as they are typically bound up in physical geography and include descriptions of infrastructure. Kinship and social structure (including age grading, peer groups, gender, voluntary associations, clans, moieties, and so forth, if they exist) are typically included. Languages spoken, dialects, and the history of language change are another group of standard topics. Practices of child rearing, acculturation, and emic views on personality and values usually follow after sections on social structure. Rites, rituals, and other evidence of religion have long been an interest and are sometimes central to ethnographies, especially when conducted in public where visiting anthropologists can see them.

As ethnography developed, anthropologists grew more interested in less tangible aspects of culture, such as values, worldview and what Clifford Geertz termed the "ethos" of the culture. In his fieldwork, Geertz used elements of a phenomenological approach, tracing not just the doings of people, but the cultural elements themselves. For example, if within a group of people, winking was a communicative gesture, he sought to first determine what kinds of things a wink might mean (it might mean several things). Then, he sought to determine in what contexts winks were used, and whether, as one moved about a region, winks remained meaningful in the same way. In this way, cultural boundaries of communication could be explored, as opposed to using linguistic boundaries or notions about the residence. Geertz, while still following something of a traditional ethnographic outline, moved outside that outline to talk about "webs" instead of "outlines" of culture.

Within cultural anthropology, there are several subgenres of ethnography. Beginning in the 1950s and early 1960s, anthropologists began writing "bio-confessional" ethnographies that intentionally exposed the nature of subjectivity in ethnographic research. Famous examples include Tristes Tropiques (1955) by Lévi-Strauss, The High Valley by Kenneth Read, and The Savage and the Innocent by David Maybury-Lewis, as well as the mildly fictionalized Return to Laughter by Elenore Smith Bowen (Laura Bohannan).

Later "reflexive" ethnographies refined the technique to translate cultural differences by representing their effects on the ethnographer. Famous examples include Deep Play: Notes on a Balinese Cockfight by Clifford Geertz, Reflections on Fieldwork in Morocco by Paul Rabinow, The Headman and I by Jean-Paul Dumont, and Tuhami by Vincent Crapanzano. In the 1980s, the rhetoric of ethnography was subjected to intense scrutiny within the discipline, under the general influence of literary theory and post-colonial/post-structuralist thought. "Experimental" ethnographies that reveal the ferment of the discipline include Shamanism, Colonialism, and the Wild Man by Michael Taussig, Debating Muslims by Michael F. J. Fischer and Mehdi Abedi, A Space on the Side of the Road by Kathleen Stewart, and Advocacy after Bhopal by Kim Fortun.

This critical turn in sociocultural anthropology during the mid-1980s can be traced to the influence of the now classic (and often contested) text, Writing Culture: The Poetics and Politics of Ethnography, (1986) edited by James Clifford and George Marcus. Writing Culture helped bring changes to both anthropology and ethnography often described in terms of being 'postmodern,' 'reflexive,' 'literary,' 'deconstructive,' or 'poststructural' in nature, in that the text helped to highlight the various epistemic and political predicaments that many practitioners saw as plaguing ethnographic representations and practices.

Where Geertz's and Turner's interpretive anthropology recognized subjects as creative actors who constructed their sociocultural worlds out of symbols, postmodernists attempted to draw attention to the privileged status of the ethnographers themselves. That is, the ethnographer cannot escape the personal viewpoint in creating an ethnographic account, thus making any claims of objective neutrality highly problematic, if not altogether impossible. In regards to this last point, Writing Culture became a focal point for looking at how ethnographers could describe different cultures and societies without denying the subjectivity of those individuals and groups being studied while simultaneously doing so without laying claim to absolute knowledge and objective authority. Along with the development of experimental forms such as 'dialogic anthropology,' 'narrative ethnography,' and 'literary ethnography', Writing Culture helped to encourage the development of 'collaborative ethnography.' This exploration of the relationship between writer, audience, and subject has become a central tenet of contemporary anthropological and ethnographic practice. In certain instances, active collaboration between the researcher(s) and subject(s) has helped blend the practice of collaboration in ethnographic fieldwork with the process of creating the ethnographic product resulting from the research.

=== Sociology ===
Sociology is another field which prominently features ethnographies. Urban sociology, Atlanta University (now Clark-Atlanta University), and the Chicago School, in particular, are associated with ethnographic research, with some well-known early examples being The Philadelphia Negro (1899) by W. E. B. Du Bois, Street Corner Society by William Foote Whyte and Black Metropolis by St. Clair Drake and Horace R. Cayton, Jr. Well-known is Jaber F. Gubrium's pioneering ethnography on the experiences of a nursing home, Living and Dying at Murray Manor. Major influences on this development were anthropologist Lloyd Warner, on the Chicago sociology faculty, and to Robert Park's experience as a journalist. Symbolic interactionism developed from the same tradition and yielded such sociological ethnographies as Shared Fantasy by Gary Alan Fine, which documents the early history of fantasy role-playing games. Other important ethnographies in sociology include Pierre Bourdieu's work in Algeria and France.

Jaber F. Gubrium created a series of organizational ethnographies focused on the everyday practices of illness, care, and recovery. They include Living and Dying at Murray Manor, which describes the social worlds of a nursing home; Describing Care: Image and Practice in Rehabilitation, which documents the social organization of patient subjectivity in a physical rehabilitation hospital; Caretakers: Treating Emotionally Disturbed Children, which features the social construction of behavioral disorders in children; and Oldtimers and Alzheimer's: The Descriptive Organization of Senility, which describes how the Alzheimer's disease movement constructed a new subjectivity of senile dementia and how that is organized in a geriatric hospital. Another approach to ethnography in sociology comes in the form of institutional ethnography, developed by Dorothy E. Smith for studying the social relations which structure people's everyday lives.

Other ethnographies include Paul Willis's Learning to Labour, on working class youth; the work of Elijah Anderson, Mitchell Duneier, and Loïc Wacquant on black America, and Lai Olurode's Glimpses of Madrasa From Africa. Even though many sub-fields and theoretical perspectives within sociology use ethnographic methods, ethnography is not the sine qua non of the discipline, as it is in cultural anthropology.

=== Communication studies ===
Beginning in the 1960s and 1970s, ethnographic research methods began to be widely used by communication scholars. As the purpose of ethnography is to describe and interpret the shared and learned patterns of values, behaviors, beliefs, and language of a culture-sharing group, Harris, (1968), also Agar (1980) note that ethnography is both a process and an outcome of the research. Studies such as Gerry Philipsen's analysis of cultural communication strategies in a blue-collar, working-class neighborhood on the south side of Chicago, Speaking 'Like a Man' in Teamsterville, paved the way for the expansion of ethnographic research in the study of communication.

Scholars of communication studies use ethnographic research methods to analyze communicative behaviors and phenomena. This is often characterized in the writing as attempts to understand taken-for-granted routines by which working definitions are socially produced. Ethnography as a method is a storied, careful, and systematic examination of the reality-generating mechanisms of everyday life (Coulon, 1995). Ethnographic work in communication studies seeks to explain "how" ordinary methods/practices/performances construct the ordinary actions used by ordinary people in the accomplishments of their identities. This often gives the perception of trying to answer the "why" and "how come" questions of human communication. Often this type of research results in a case study or field study such as an analysis of speech patterns at a protest rally, or the way firemen communicate during "down time" at a fire station. Like anthropology scholars, communication scholars often immerse themselves, and participate in and/or directly observe the particular social group being studied.

=== Business ===
Anthropologists such as Daniel Miller and Mary Douglas have used ethnographic data to answer academic questions about consumers and consumption. Tony Salvador, Genevieve Bell, and Ken Anderson describe design ethnography as being "a way of understanding the particulars of daily life in such a way as to increase the success probability of a new product or service or, more appropriately, to reduce the probability of failure specifically due to a lack of understanding of the basic behaviors and frameworks of consumers." Sociologist Sam Ladner argues in her book, that understanding consumers and their desires requires a shift in "standpoint", one that only ethnography provides. The results are products and services that respond to consumers' unmet needs.

Business have found ethnographers helpful for understanding how people use products and services. By assessing user experience in a "natural" setting, ethnology yields insights into the practical applications of a product or service. It is one of the best ways to identify areas of friction and improve overall user experience. Furthermore, Sam Ladner's 2014 book Practical Ethnography: A Guide to Doing Ethnography in the Private Sector emphasized the value of ethnography for providing new insights by conducting research through the view of the insiders.

Companies may use ethnographic methods to understand consumers and consumption, or for new product development (such as video ethnography). The Ethnographic Praxis in Industry (EPIC) conference is evidence of this because they are a journal that publishes articles relating to ethnographic and sociocultural approaches to address business challenges. Ethnographers' systematic and holistic approach to real-life experience is valued by product developers, who use the method to understand unstated desires or cultural practices that surround products. Some marketers utilize ethnography as an alternative to focus groups, suggesting that observational research can highlight disparities between consumers' self-reported data and their actual behavior.

=== Religious studies ===
In the field of religious studies, ethnography can be used as a methodology to understand the insider perspective. Anthropologist and religious studies scholar, Robert Orsi, points out that ethnography breaks down the traditional "firewall between scholars of religion and such experiences." Orsi also conveys the importance that a religious studies ethnographer should step into a religious world "without anxiously translating it" into their world, "without dismissing it", and "without passing judgement."

Ethnography also allows religious studies scholars to understand the difference between individual practice and broader community and organization culture. Furthermore, scholars Penny Edgell and Nancy Eiesland explain that ethnography can also counter people's tendency to overgeneralize when it comes to American religion. Additionally, ethnography can be used to understand meaning rather than impose professional definitions onto everything.

=== Evaluating ethnography ===
The ethnographic methodology is not usually evaluated in terms of philosophical standpoint (such as positivism and emotionalism). Ethnographic studies need to be evaluated in some manner. No consensus has been developed on evaluation standards, but Richardson (2000, p. 254) provides five criteria that ethnographers might find helpful. Jaber F. Gubrium and James A. Holstein's (1997) monograph, The New Language of Qualitative Method, discusses forms of ethnography in terms of their "methods talk".

1. Substantive contribution: "Does the piece contribute to our understanding of social life?"
2. Aesthetic merit: "Does this piece succeed aesthetically?"
3. Reflexivity: "How did the author come to write this text...Is there adequate self-awareness and self-exposure for the reader to make judgments about the point of view?"
4. Impact: "Does this affect me? Emotionally? Intellectually?" Does it move me?
5. Expresses a reality: "Does it seem 'true'—a credible account of a cultural, social, individual, or communal sense of the 'real'?"

== Ethics ==
Gary Alan Fine argues that the nature of ethnographic inquiry demands that researchers deviate from formal and idealistic rules or ethics that have come to be widely accepted in qualitative and quantitative approaches in research. Many of these ethical assumptions are rooted in positivist and post-positivist epistemologies that have adapted over time but are apparent and must be accounted for in all research paradigms. These ethical dilemmas are evident throughout the entire process of conducting ethnographies, including the design, implementation, and reporting of an ethnographic study. Essentially, Fine maintains that researchers are typically not as ethical as they claim or assume to be — and that "each job includes ways of doing things that would be inappropriate for others to know".

Fine is not necessarily casting blame at ethnographic researchers but tries to show that researchers often make idealized ethical claims and standards which are inherently based on partial truths and self-deceptions. Fine also acknowledges that many of these partial truths and self-deceptions are unavoidable. He maintains that "illusions" are essential to maintain an occupational reputation and avoid potentially more caustic consequences. He claims, "Ethnographers cannot help but lie, but in lying, we reveal truths that escape those who are not so bold". Based on these assertions, Fine establishes three conceptual clusters in which ethnographic ethical dilemmas can be situated: "Classic Virtues", "Technical Skills", and "Ethnographic Self".

Much debate surrounding the issue of ethics arose following revelations about how the ethnographer Napoleon Chagnon conducted his ethnographic fieldwork with the Yanomani people of South America.

While there is no international standard on Ethnographic Ethics, many western anthropologists look to the American Anthropological Association for guidance when conducting ethnographic work. In 2009, the Association adopted a code of ethics, stating: Anthropologists have "moral obligations as members of other groups, such as the family, religion, and community, as well as the profession". The code of ethics notes that anthropologists are part of a wider scholarly and political network, as well as human and natural environment, which needs to be reported on respectfully. The code of ethics recognizes that sometimes very close and personal relationship can sometimes develop from doing ethnographic work. The Association acknowledges that the code is limited in scope; ethnographic work can sometimes be multidisciplinary, and anthropologists need to be familiar with ethics and perspectives of other disciplines as well. The eight-page code of ethics outlines ethical considerations for those conducting Research, Teaching, Application and Dissemination of Results, which are briefly outlined below.

- "Conducting Research" – When conducting research Anthropologists need to be aware of the potential impacts of the research on the people and animals they study. If the seeking of new knowledge will negatively impact the people and animals they will be studying they may not undertake the study according to the code of ethics.
- "Teaching" – When teaching the discipline of anthropology, instructors are required to inform students of the ethical dilemmas of conducting ethnographies and field work.
- "Application" – When conducting an ethnography, Anthropologists must be "open with funders, colleagues, persons studied or providing information, and relevant parties affected by the work about the purpose(s), potential impacts, and source(s) of support for the work."
- "Dissemination of Results" – When disseminating results of an ethnography, "[a]nthropologists have an ethical obligation to consider the potential impact of both their research and the communication or dissemination of the results of their research on all directly or indirectly involved." Research results of ethnographies should not be withheld from participants in the research if that research is being observed by other people.

=== Classic virtues ===
- "The kindly ethnographer" – Most ethnographers present themselves as being more sympathetic than they are, which aids in the research process, but is also deceptive. The identity that we present to subjects is different from whom we are in other circumstances.
- "The friendly ethnographer" – Ethnographers operate under the assumption that they should not dislike anyone. When ethnographers find they intensely dislike individuals encountered in the research, they may crop them out of the findings.
- "The honest ethnographer" – If research participants know the research goals, their responses will likely be skewed. Therefore, ethnographers often conceal what they know in order to increase the likelihood of acceptance by participants.

=== Technical skills ===
Gary Alan Fine highlights several technical illusions inherent to ethnographic reporting. He critiques the concept of the 'precise ethnographer' arguing that researchers often create the illusion that field notes flawlessly reflect reality, when in practice they rely on loose interpretations and paraphrasing to approximate truth. Similarly, Fine challenges the assumption of the 'observant ethnographer' noting that readers are often led to believe a report is entirely comprehensive. In reality, a researcher lack omniscience and will inevitably miss aspects of a scene. Furthermore, the notion of the 'unobtrusive ethnographer' is complicated by the fact that the researcher's mere presence as an active participant invariably alters the social dynamics and communication within the research site.

=== Ethnographic self ===
Ethical dilemmas frequently arise regarding how the researcher personally situates themselves within the study. Fine argues that the 'candid ethnographer' is largely an illusion, as it is ethically problematic to assume every detail reported was directly observed. Furthermore, researchers inevitably develop personal relationships with participants (the 'chaste ethnographer' dilemma), which may influence findings even if omitted from the final report. Because all ethnography is filtered through the researcher's perspective, claims of absolute objectivity or fairness are often scrutinized. Ultimately, the ethnographer must balance straightforward factual reporting with narrative representation, meaning the individual literary skills of the researcher heavily influence the perceived value of the text.

According to Norman K. Denzin, ethnographers should consider the following seven principles when observing, recording, and sampling data:

1. The groups should combine symbolic meanings with patterns of interaction.
2. Observe the world from the point of view of the subject, while maintaining the distinction between everyday and scientific perceptions of reality.
3. Link the group's symbols and their meanings with the social relationships.
4. Record all behavior.
5. The methodology should highlight phases of process, change, and stability.
6. The act should be a type of symbolic interactionism.
7. Use concepts that would avoid casual explanations.

== Forms ==
=== Autoethnography ===
Autoethnography is a form of ethnographic research in which a researcher connects personal experiences to wider cultural, political, and social meanings and understandings. According to Adams et al., autoethnography

1. uses a researcher's personal experience to describe and critique cultural beliefs, practices, and experiences;
2. acknowledges and values a researcher's relationships with others
3. uses deep and careful self-reflection—typically referred to as "reflexivity"—to name and interrogate the intersections between self and society, the particular and the general, the personal and the political
4. shows people in the process of figuring out what to do, how to live, and the meaning of their struggles
5. balances intellectual and methodological rigor, emotion, and creativity
6. strives for social justice and to make life better.

Bochner and Ellis have also defined autoethnography as "an autobiographical genre of writing and research that displays multiple layers of consciousness, connecting the personal to the cultural." They further indicate that autoethnography is typically written in first-person and can "appear in a variety of forms," such as "short stories, poetry, fiction, novels, photographic essays, personal essays, journals, fragmented and layered writing, and social science prose."

=== Genealogical method ===
The genealogical method investigates links of kinship determined by marriage and descent. The method owes its origin from the book of British ethnographer W. H. R. Rivers titled "Kinship and Social Organisation" in 1911. Genealogy or kinship commonly plays a crucial role in the structure of non-industrial societies, determining both social relations and group relationship to the past. Marriage, for example, is frequently pivotal in determining military alliances between villages, clans or ethnic groups.

In the field of epistemology the term is used to characterize the philosophical method employed by such writers as Friedrich Nietzsche and Michel Foucault.

=== Digital ethnography ===
Digital ethnography is also seen as virtual ethnography. This type of ethnography is not so typical as ethnography recorded by pen and pencil. Digital ethnography allows for a lot more opportunities to look at different cultures and societies. Traditional ethnography may use videos or images, but digital ethnography goes more in-depth. For example, digital ethnographers would use social media platforms such as Twitter or blogs so that people's interactions and behaviors can be studied. Modern developments in computing power and AI have enabled higher efficiencies in ethnographic data collection via multimedia and computational analysis using machine learning to corroborate many data sources together to produce a refined output for various purposes. A modern example of this technology in application, is the use of captured audio in smart devices, transcribed to issue targeted adverts (often reconciled vs other metadata, or product development data for designers.

Digital ethnography comes with its own set of ethical questions, and the Association of Internet Researchers' ethical guidelines are frequently used. Gabriele de Seta's paper "Three Lies of Digital Ethnography" explores some of the methodological questions more central to a specific ethnographic approach to internet studies, drawing upon Fine's classic text.

=== Multispecies ethnography ===
Multispecies ethnography in particular focuses on both nonhuman and human participants within a group or culture, as opposed to just human participants in traditional ethnography. A multispecies ethnography, in comparison to other forms of ethnography, studies species that are connected to people and our social lives. Species affect and are affected by culture, economics, and politics.

The study's roots go back to general anthropology of animals. One of the earliest well-known studies was Lewis Henry Morgan's The American Beaver and His Works (1868). His study closely observed a group of beavers in Northern Michigan. Morgan's main objective was to highlight that the daily individual tasks that the beavers performed were complex communicative acts that had been passed down for generations.

In the early 2000s multi-species ethnography took on a huge increase in popularity. The annual meetings of the American Anthropological Association began to host the Multispecies Salon, a collection of discussions, showcases, and other events for anthropologists. The event provided a space for anthropologists and artists to come together and showcase vast knowledge of different organisms and their intertwined systems.

Multispecies ethnography highlights a lot of the negative effects of these shared environments and systems. Not only does multispecies ethnography observe the physical relationships between organisms, it also takes note of the emotional and psychological relationships built between species.

=== Relational ethnography ===
Most ethnographies are conducted in particular settings where the researcher can witness events or behaviors relevant to the study’s focusRelational Ethnography articulates studying fields rather than places or processes rather than processed people. Meaning that relational ethnography doesn't take an object nor a bounded group that is defined by its members shared social features nor a specific location that is delimited by the boundaries of a particular area. But rather the processes involving configurations of relations among different agents or institutions. For instance, such places could be created through an interconnection between the place at hand and the people that live within it and continuously re-create meaning by sharing and changing historic narratives of this place. Applying this form of ethnography to land and landscape, Munira Khayyat suggests that this approach can also help to refocus previous versions of histories, for example the stories of soldiers and their reception in their homes, to those that have been impacted by the wars on the ground (e.g., civilians in Southern Lebanon).

== See also ==
- Area studies
- Autoethnography
- Critical ethnography
- Ethnoarchaeology
- Ethnography of communication
- Ethnographic Museum
- Ethnology
- Ethnosemiotics
- Folklore
- Immersion journalism
- Living lab
- Online ethnography
- Ontology
- Participant observation
- Qualitative research
- Realist ethnography
- Video ethnography
- Visual ethnography
