= Gary Alan Fine =

American sociologist (born 1950)

- Born: May 11, 1950 (age 76); New York City, US
- Occupation: Sociologist

Academic background
- Education: University of Pennsylvania (BA 1972); Harvard University (PhD 1976)

Academic work
- Discipline: Sociology
- Sub-discipline: Ethnography; Symbolic interactionism
- Institutions: University of Minnesota (1976–1990); University of Georgia (1990–1997); Northwestern University (1997–2016)

Gary Alan Fine (born May 11, 1950, in New York City) is an American sociologist. He is best known for his work on the ethnography of small group activities from Little League teams to mushroom hunters and Dungeons & Dragons players. He has taught at the University of Minnesota, the University of Georgia (where he headed the sociology department 1990–1993), and Northwestern University. His research is particularly associated with the methods of symbolic interactionism, and he was a president of the Society for the Study of Symbolic Interactionism (1990), the Midwest Sociological Society (2001–2002), and the Society for the Study of Social Problems (2004–2005).

== Early life and education ==
Fine was born May 11, 1950, in New York City. The son of Bernard David Fine and Bernice Estelle Tanz, Fine grew up in Manhattan and went to the Horace Mann School. He studied for a psychology BA at the University of Pennsylvania, where he graduated Phi Beta Kappa in 1972. He attended graduate school at Harvard University from 1972 to 1976 and received his PhD from Harvard in social psychology. His dissertation advisor was the small group theorist Robert F. Bales.

== Career ==
In 1976, Fine became an assistant professor in the sociology department at the University of Minnesota. At various times, he was a visiting professor at Indiana University (1980), the University of Chicago (1985), the University of Bremen (1986), and the University of Iceland (1988). In 1988, he received the American Folklore Society's Opie Award for the Best Scholarly Book in the field of Children's Folklore and Culture for his work With The Boys, an ethnographic study of Little League baseball teams.

In 1990, he became the department head of the Department of Sociology at the University of Georgia, a position he held until 1993, after which he remained a professor. In 1990 he was also the president of the Society for the Study of Symbolic Interactionism. He became a fellow of the American Folklore Society in 1994 and a full member of Folklore Fellows International in 1995. During the academic year 1994–1995, he was a fellow at the Center for Advanced Study in the Behavioral Sciences, now affiliated with Stanford University.

He continued at the University of Georgia until accepting a position at Northwestern University in Evanston, Illinois beginning in 1997, where in 2004 he was named John Evans Professor. He later became James E. Johnson professor at Northwestern and retired emeritus. In 2001–2002, he was the president of the Midwest Sociological Society, and 2004–2005 he was President of the Society for the Study of Social Problems. In 2003 Fine was a fellow at the Swedish Collegium for Advanced Study in the Social Sciences in Uppsala in Sweden. In 2005 and 2006, he was a visiting scholar at the Russell Sage Foundation in New York City. He is a former editor of Social Psychology Quarterly (2006–2010), an official journal of the American Sociological Association. He was awarded a Guggenheim Fellowship in 2010.

In 2018, Fine was elected to the American Academy of Arts and Sciences. In 2022, he received a lifetime achievement award from the Section on the History of Sociology and Social Thought of the American Sociological Association.

== Personal life ==
Fine is married to Susan Hirsig Fine and has two children.

== Academic focus ==
Fine has written ethnographies of a number of diverse small group activities from analyses of Dungeons & Dragons players and mushroom hunters to high school policy debaters and restaurant workers. Fine maintains that these different groups and distinct areas connect:

My central research and writing focus is on the relationship between culture and social culture. This interest informs all of my writing from my study of Little League baseball to that of rumor to that of fantasy games. The question I ask is how is expressive culture shaped by the social system in which we all live and how does this social system affect the culture that we create and that we participate in. I examine the way in which small groups affect and give meaning to our shared experiences.

His work on rumor has made a substantial contribution to the understanding of urban legends and the transmission of rumors. In 2001, he co-authored a book with University of California-Davis Professor Patricia Turner on rumors in the African-American community and rumors and urban legends held by whites about blacks in the United States. He is currently researching rumors related to the September 11 attacks and terrorism. A recently published manuscript deals with the social production and communication of scientific work at the National Weather Service.

Another area of research includes the complicated historical and social reputations of figures such as Thorstein Veblen, Benedict Arnold, Fatty Arbuckle, Herman Melville, Vladimir Nabokov, Warren Harding, Sinclair Lewis, and Henry Ford. On August 4, 2004, several months before the 2004 Presidential Election, he set off a minor storm, especially in the political blogger community, with his op-ed piece in The Washington Post "Ire to the Chief" that argued that the commonly expressed hatreds of presidents George W. Bush, Bill Clinton, and Richard Nixon reflected their behavior and activities in youth more than their specific policies as president.

Fine is also a major figure in the study of the work of Erving Goffman and the theory of symbolic interactionism. He co-edited with Gregory W. H. Smith a major compilation of Goffman's work and of criticism and analysis of his contribution to the social sciences. Together with Kent Sandstrom and Dan Martin, he has produced a forthcoming textbook on symbolic interactionism entitled Symbols, Selves, and Social Reality: A Symbolic Interactionist Approach to Sociology and Social Psychology.

=== Further areas ===
==== Restaurants ====
In addition to his analysis of restaurant establishment culture in his 1996 book Kitchens: The Culture of Restaurant Work, Fine considers himself a sort of amateur restaurant critic. Through 2015, he maintained a blog, called Veal Cheeks, describing his restaurant visits while living in New York City. His writing style, punchy and wry, can also be seen in his review of Eric Schlosser's book, Fast Food Nation, for Reason magazine.

==== Art ====
Another subject in which Fine has combined his personal and academic interests is art. While researching his book about outsider art Everyday Genius, he became well-acquainted with many of the major figures and artists in that segment of the art world. He studied the cases of major outsider (self-taught) artists like Henry Darger, Bill Traylor, Edgar Tolson, Thornton Dial, Lonnie Holley, Martin Ramirez, Sam Doyle, and Howard Finster. He is also an avid collector of outsider art himself. While researching the book and living in Georgia, he was a member of the Nexus Center for Contemporary Art and a board member at the High Museum of Art in Atlanta. He is also currently a board member of the Intuit: Center for Intuitive and Outsider Art in Chicago.

==== Policy Debate ====
During his research for Gifted Tongues: High School Debate and Adolescent Culture, Fine followed and observed several high school policy debate teams in Minnesota. The book depicts an activity, although popular in United States, that is often seen as esoteric and confusing. His son, Todd David Fine, as described in the dedication to the book, first saw a video of the activity as a young child while Fine was researching the book. Apparently inspired, in high school, Todd, along with his partners Adam Goldstein and Julie Bashkin, went on to capture the national-circuit debate championship the Tournament of Champions and the Barkley Forum at Emory University, another major championship in the activity.

== Selected works ==
- (With Ralph Rosnow) Rumor and Gossip: The Social Psychology of Hearsay, Elsevier-North Holland (New York, NY), 1976.
- Shared Fantasy: Role Playing Games as Social Worlds, University of Chicago Press (Chicago, IL), 1983.
- Talking Sociology, Allyn and Bacon (Boston, MA), 1985.
- With the Boys: Little League Baseball and Preadolescent Culture, University of Chicago Press (Chicago, IL), 1987.
- (Editor) Meaningful Play, Playful Meaning, Human Kinetics Publishers (Champaign, IL), 1987.
- (With Kent L. Sandstrom) Knowing Children: Participant Observation with Minors, Sage (Newberry Park, CA), 1988.
- (Editor, with John Johnson and Harvey A. Farberman) Sociological Slices: Introductory Readings from the Interactionist Perspective, JAI Press (Greenwich, CT), 1992.
- Manufacturing Tales: Sex and Money in Contemporary Legends, University of Tennessee Press (Knoxville, TN), 1992.
- (Editor, with Karen Cook and James S. House) Sociological Perspectives on Social Psychology, Allyn and Bacon (Boston, MA), 1994.
- (Editor) A Second Chicago School?: The Development of a Postwar American Sociology, University of Chicago (Chicago, IL), 1995.
- Kitchens: The Culture of Restaurant Work, University of California (Berkeley, CA), 1996.
- Morel Tales: The Culture of Mushrooming, Harvard University Press (Cambridge, MA), 1998.
- (Editor, with Gregory W. H. Smith) Erving Goffman, Sage (Thousand Oaks, CA), 2000.
- Difficult Reputations: Collective Memories of the Evil, Inept, and Controversial, University of Chicago Press (Chicago, IL), 2001.
- Gifted Tongues: High School Debate and Adolescent Culture, Princeton University Press (Princeton, NJ), 2001.
- (With Patricia A. Turner) Whispers on the Color Line: Rumor and Race in America, University of California (Berkeley, CA), 2001.
- (With Daniel D. Martin and Kent L. Sandstrom) Symbols, Selves, and Social Life: A Symbolic Interactionist Approach, Roxbury (Los Angeles, CA), 2002.
- (With David Shulman) Talking Sociology, Fifth Edition. Allyn and Bacon (Boston, MA), 2003.
- Everyday Genius: Self-Taught Art and the Culture of Authenticity, University of Chicago Press (Chicago, IL), 2004.
- (With Kent Sandstrom and Daniel D. Martin) Symbols, Selves and Social Life: A Symbolic Interactionist Approach to Sociology and Social Psychology. Roxbury (Los Angeles, CA), In press.
- Players and Pawns: How Chess Builds Community and Culture, University of Chicago Press (Chicago, IL), 2015.
- Talking Art: The Culture of Practice and the Practice of Culture in MFA Education, University of Chicago Press (Chicago, IL), 2018.
- The Hinge: Civil Society, Group Cultures, and the Power of Local Commitments, University of Chicago Press (Chicago, IL), 2021.
- Fair Share: Senior Activism, Tiny Publics, and the Culture of Resistance, University of Chicago Press (Chicago, IL), 2023.
- Joy to the World: The Performance of Collective Pleasure, University of Chicago Press (Chicago, IL), 2026.
