= Ethnographic realism =

Concept in social sciences

Within the field of anthropology and other social sciences, ethnography is a form of research that relies on a range of sources of data, but usually tends to rely mainly on participant observation. However, the term also refers to the product of this type of research, which of course normally takes a textual form. As a result, ethnography is also sometimes seen as a genre of writing, one used to describe patterns of human social interaction in particular contexts.

Within the context of ethnography, the term 'realism' is often used to refer to the assumptions that some kinds of ethnographic work make about the phenomena to be investigated, and how these are to be understood. However, 'ethnographic realism' has also been used to refer to a style of writing that narrates the author's experiences and observations as if the reader were witnessing or experiencing events first hand. A work written using ethnographic realism may be referred to as a realist ethnography, and classified as a subgenre of ethnography.

== Styles of ethnographic realism ==
George Marcus and Dick Cushman described and categorized realist ethnographies under certain characteristics.

- Totalizing description
- Omniscient narration
- Native interpretation
- Generalizations
- Jargon
