= Global Lives Project =

American nonprofit organization

- Company type: Nonprofit
- Website type: Video library of human life experience
- Headquarters: San Francisco, California
- Website: globallives.org

The Global Lives Project is a nonprofit organization consisting of volunteer filmmakers and photographers, programmers and engineers, architects and designers, students and scholars. The mission of the organization is to collaboratively build a video library of human life experience that reshapes how individuals conceive of cultures, nations and people outside of their own communities.

== Program areas ==
The Global Lives Project has four main program areas: exhibitions, curating, education and screenings.

- Exhibitions: The organization creates multi-screen video installations featuring 24-hour-long films of individual lives. The installations are intended to create a space of contemplation and reflection.
- Curating Video: The Global Lives Project currently curates a permanent online video library of footage and provides a hub for its community of volunteers. Globallives.org allows users to explore the video collection in multiple languages, access education materials, propose new shoots, build teams of collaborators and raise money for new productions.
- Education: The organization provides materials intended to provide lessons in social studies, language arts, geography, statistics, foreign languages, art and community service.
- Screenings and Discussions: Aside from video installations, the Global Lives Project holds screenings and presentations at universities, cultural centers, and events. Screenings have been held at venues such as the Smithsonian National Museum of Natural History and Harvard University.

== History ==
The first phase of The Global Lives Project was an international collaboration of filmmakers who produced 10 documentaries. Each documentary is 24 hours long and captures a complete day in the life of the film subject. These subjects were chosen to be demographically representative of the global population, so that they match the global distributions of rural vs. urban population, regional distribution, gender, income level, religion, and age.

The first full premiere of all 10 videos occurred at a museum in San Francisco in February 2010. The Yerba Buena Center for the Arts hosted a four-month exhibition that drew more than 20,000 visitors. Dozens of other installations, screenings and lectures have been held in various locations around the world, including the United Nations University in Tokyo.

The Global Lives Project was founded by David Evan Harris and has been supported by the Black Rock Arts Foundation, the Long Now Foundation, the Adobe Foundation, the Burwen Education Foundation, the Consulate of Switzerland in San Francisco, The National Endowment for the Arts, and hundreds of individual donors.
