= Shared Fantasy: Role Playing Games as Social Worlds =

- Author: Gary Alan Fine
- Publisher: University of Chicago Press
- Publication date: 1987
- ISBN: 0226249441

Shared Fantasy: Role Playing Games as Social Worlds is a 1983 book written by Gary Alan Fine and published by University of Chicago Press.

== Contents ==
Shared Fantasy: Role Playing Games as Social Worlds is a book in which a sociological study examines the people who play fantasy games. The book explores the social dynamics within gaming groups, focusing on how players interact, form communities, and navigate group norms. Fine began his research in 1978 as an outsider and gradually became a respected participant, and so offers a dual perspective. The book investigates questions like how groups recruit new members, manage disruptive players, and negotiate themes of sex, violence, and gender. It also probes whether gamers are more intelligent than average, how referees handle fairness, and how often genuine role-playing occurs.

== Reception ==
Steve Jackson reviewed Shared Fantasy for Fantasy Gamer magazine and stated that "Who should buy Shared Fantasy? Any fantasy game designer, game company executive, or (definitely!) game club officer. This is the text on the people you're dealing with. Empire of the Petal Throne fans may want it; one whole chapter is dedicated to EPT and its designer, M.A.R. Barker, with humorous anecdotes and genuine insights into Barker's own fantasy world. And, finally, any referee or gamer who likes to watch the people behind the characters will enjoy Shared Fantasy."

== Reviews ==
- Space Gamer #79
