= Visual ethnography =

Ethnographic concept

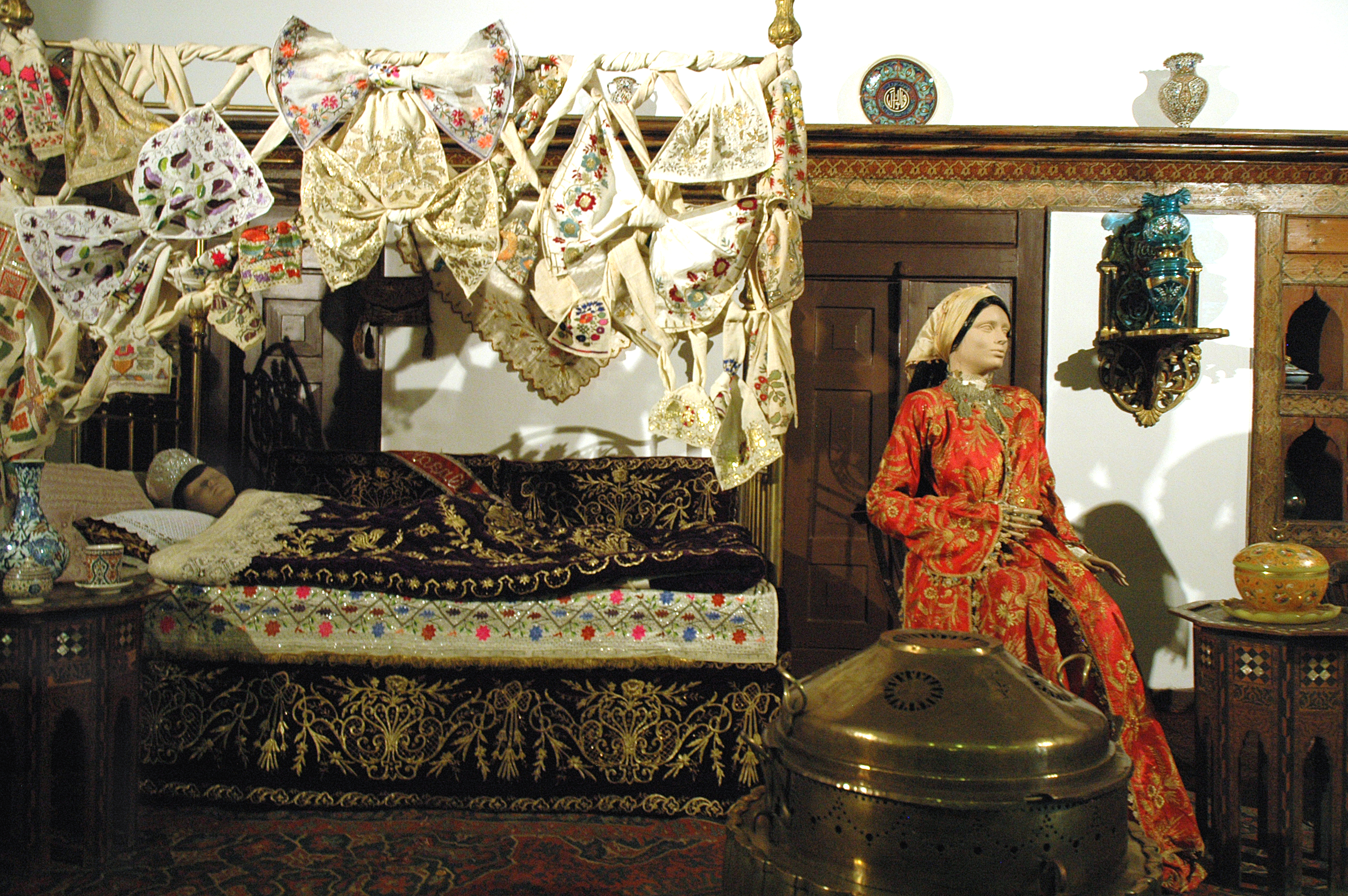
Ethnography Museum of Ankara circumcision ceremonies

Visual ethnography is an approach to ethnography (the study of people and cultures) that uses visual methods such as photography, film and video. There are many methods available to conduct visual ethnography. According to Sarah Pink, visual ethnography is a research methodology that brings “theory and practice of visual approaches to learning and knowing about the world and communicating these to others”. As a methodology, visual ethnography can guide the design of research as well as the methods to choose for data collection. Visual ethnography suggests a negotiation of the participants’ view of reality and a constant questioning on the part of the researcher.

== Historical development ==
Beginning in the early 1900s, researchers have recognized the importance of visual methods which has largely emerged from anthropology. That is when photography as well as video became ways of recording targeted populations during field work which are called “salvage ethnography” or “salvage anthropology.” Flaherty's Nanook of the North (1922), Margaret Mead's and Gregory Bateson's video and photos of the Balinese, and Evans-Prichard's photographs of the Nuer are examples of this “salvage ethnography (Pink, 2006, cited in van den Scott, 2018). Boas as explained by Pink was an early user of photography who did not trust it and thought that surface images could be an issue in which might shift the historical understanding of culture. Through the 1900s to 1950s, mainstream anthropology rejected visual methods. Ethnographic photography was still in use- less for analysis and more for context. Despite the move away from applied anthropology through the 1970s and 1980s, ethnographic filmmaking is still common. Still marginal, Visual methods slowly became a tradition and exploded when reflexive research made a dramatic turn. Visual methods shaped interdisciplinary interest during the late 1990s and early 2000s. Visual methods became recognized across social sciences as digital technology became available, maintaining their roots in ethnography and anthropology. Sarah Pink claims for an “anthropology of the relationship between the visual and other elements of culture, society, practice and experience and the methodological practice of combining visual and other media in the production and representation of anthropological knowledge”.

== Qualitative research ==
Visual ethnography as an aspect of the use of visual data has become increasingly important as a part of the qualitative research toolbox. Qualitative research is an off-shoot of the anthropological practice of ethnography that focuses on the collection and analysis of diverse narrative or textual forms of expression. In describing the importance of visual ethnography in qualitative research, Banks explained that as images are present in society their illustration should be included in the studies of society, and that study of images in the accumulation of data may reveal sociological understanding that may not be accessible. Images can be the central part of analysis of social-cultural views and perceptions created by researchers, or participants. According to Van Maanen in using visual ethnography as a qualitative research methodology, “the researcher studies an entire cultural or social group on its natural setting, closely examining customs and ways of life, with the aim of describing and interpreting cultural patterns of behaviour, values, and practices".
