= Ralph Rosnow =

Ralph L. Rosnow is an American professor emeritus of psychology. He is a fellow of the American Psychological Association (APA) and the American Association for the Advancement of Science (AAAS).

He published Humor and Gossip in 1976. In 1981 he published Paradigms in Transition: The methodology of Social Inquiry.
