= List of anthropologists =

This list of anthropologists is presented in English alphabetical transliteration order (by surnames).

== A ==
- John Adair
- B. R. Ambedkar
- Giulio Angioni
- Jon Altman
- Arjun Appadurai
- Talal Asad
- Timothy Asch
- Scott Atran
- Marc Augé

== B ==
- Pauline Gardiner Barber
- Nigel Barley
- Fredrik Barth
- Vasily Bartold
- Keith H. Basso
- Daisy Bates
- Gregory Bateson
- Mary Catherine Bateson
- Richard Bauman
- Ruth Behar
- Ruth Benedict
- Dorothy A. Bennett
- Carl H. Berendt
- Lee Berger
- Brent Berlin
- Catherine Helen Webb Berndt
- Catherine L. Besteman
- Theodore C. Bestor
- Lewis Binford
- Marian Binkley
- Evelyn Blackwood
- Wilhelm Bleek
- Maurice Bloch
- Anton Blok
- Franz Boas
- Tom Boellstorff
- Paul Bohannan
- Dmitri Bondarenko
- Pere Bosch-Gimpera
- Pierre Bourdieu
- Philippe Bourgois
- Charles L. Briggs
- Paul Broca
- Christian Bromberger
- Kari Bruwelheide
- Peter Buck (Te Rangi Hīroa)

== C ==
- Julio Caro Baroja
- Edmund Carpenter
- Napoleon Chagnon
- Pierre Clastres
- Mabel Cook Cole
- Malcolm Carr Collier
- Harold C. Conklin
- Carleton S. Coon
- Frank Hamilton Cushing

== D ==
- Regna Darnell
- Raymond Dart
- Emma Lou Davis
- Wade Davis
- Ernesto de Martino
- Ella Cara Deloria
- Raymond J. DeMallie
- Philippe Descola
- Stanley Diamond
- Mary Douglas
- Paul W. Draper
- Cora Du Bois
- Eugene Dubois
- Robin Dunbar
- Ann Dunham
- Katherine Dunham
- Elizabeth Cullen Dunn
- Émile Durkheim

== E ==
- Mary Lindsay Elmendolf
- Verrier Elwin
- Matthew Engelke
- Friedrich Engels
- Arturo Escobar
- E. E. Evans-Pritchard

== F ==
- Johannes Fabian
- James Ferguson
- Raymond Firth
- Ann Kindrick Fischer
- Raymond D. Fogelson
- Meyer Fortes
- Gregory Forth
- Dian Fossey
- Kate Fox
- Robin Fox
- James Frazer
- Lina Fruzzetti

== G ==
- Clifford Geertz
- Alfred Gell
- Ernest Gellner
- Herb Di Gioia
- Max Gluckman
- Maurice Godelier
- Jane Goodall
- Marjorie Harness Goodwin
- Igor Gorevich
- Harold A. Gould
- David Graeber
- Hilma Granqvist
- J. Patrick Gray
- Marcel Griaule
- Jacob Grimm
- Wilhelm Grimm

== H ==
- Abdellah Hammoudi
- Ulf Hannerz
- Michael Harkin
- Michael Harner
- John P. Harrington
- Marvin Harris
- K. David Harrison
- Kirsten Hastrup
- Jacquetta Hawkes
- Brian Douglas Hayden
- Rose Oldfield Hayes
- Stephen C. Headley
- Thor Heyerdahl
- Arthur Maurice Hocart
- Ian Hodder
- E. Adamson Hoebel
- Earnest Hooton
- Robin W.G. Horton
- Aleš Hrdlička
- Eva Verbitsky Hunt
- Zora Neale Hurston
- Dell Hymes

== I ==
- Miyako Inoue
- Bill Irons

== J ==
- Ira Jacknis
- John M. Janzen
- Thomas Des Jean
- F. Landa Jocano
- Alfred E. Johnson
- William Jones
- Michal Josephy
- Jeffrey S. Juris

== K ==
- Sergei Kan
- Bengt G. Karlsson
- Jomo Kenyatta
- David Kertzer
- Alice Beck Kehoe
- Anatoly Khazanov
- Dolly Kikon
- Richard G. Klein
- Chris Knight
- Anne Knudsen
- Eduardo Kohn
- Dorinne K. Kondo
- Andrey Korotayev
- Conrad Kottak
- Charles H. Kraft
- Grover Krantz
- Alfred L. Kroeber
- Theodora Kroeber
- Lars Krutak
- Adam Kuper

== L ==
- William Labov
- George Lakoff
- Harold E. Lambert
- Edmund Leach
- Eleanor Leacock
- Murray Leaf
- Louis Leakey
- Mary Leakey
- Richard Leakey
- Nataliia Lebedeva
- Richard Borshay Lee
- Charles Miller Leslie
- Claude Lévi-Strauss
- Ellen Lewin
- C. Scott Littleton
- Albert Buell Lewis
- Oscar Lewis
- Phillip Harold Lewis
- Roland Littlewood
- Robert Lowie
- Nancy Lurie

== M ==
- Alan Macfarlane
- Saba Mahmood
- Bronisław Malinowski
- Mahmood Mamdani
- George Marcus
- Jonathan M. Marks
- Karl Marx
- John Alden Mason
- Michael Atwood Mason
- Marcel Mauss
- Phillip McArthur
- Irma McClaurin
- Charles Harrison McNutt
- Margaret Mead
- Mervyn Meggitt
- Josef Mengele
- Nicholas Miklouho-Maclay
- Emily Martin
- Horace Mitchell Miner
- Sidney Mintz
- Louis Molet
- Ashley Montagu
- James Mooney
- Henrietta L. Moore
- John H. Moore
- Lewis H. Morgan
- Desmond Morris
- George Murdock
- Yolanda Murphy

== N ==
- Laura Nader
- Moni Nag
- Jeremy Narby
- Raoul Naroll
- Josiah Nott
- Erland Nordenskiöld

== O ==
- Gananath Obeyesekere
- Kaori O'Connor
- Aihwa Ong
- Marvin Opler
- Morris Opler
- Sherry Ortner
- Keith F. Otterbein
- Evelia Edith Oyhenart

== P ==
- Elsie Clews Parsons
- Bronisław Piłsudski
- Thomas J. Pluckhahn
- Hortense Powdermaker
- A.H.J. Prins
- Harald E.L. Prins
- Andrea Procter

== Q ==
- Buell Quain
- James Quesada

== R ==
- Paul Rabinow
- Wilhelm Radloff
- Laurence Ralph
- Lucinda Ramberg
- Roy Rappaport
- Hans Ras
- Alfred Reginald Radcliffe-Brown
- Margaret Read
- Gerardo Reichel-Dolmatoff
- Kathy Reichs
- Audrey Richards
- W. H. R. Rivers
- Paul Rivet
- Uzma Z. Rizvi
- Joel Robbins
- Renato Rosaldo
- Gayle Rubin
- Robert A. Rubinstein

== S ==
- Marshall Sahlins
- Noel B. Salazar
- Roger Sandall
- Edward Sapir
- Patricia Sawin
- Nancy Scheper-Hughes
- Wilhelm Schmidt
- Tobias Schneebaum
- James C. Scott
- Thayer Scudder
- Anita Seppilli
- Elman Service
- Afanasy Shchapov
- Gerald F. Schroedl
- Florence Connolly Shipek
- Sydel Silverman
- Audra Simpson
- Cathy Small
- Christen A. Smith
- Jacques Soustelle
- Melford Spiro
- James Spradley
- Julian Steward
- Herbert Spencer
- Marilyn Strathern
- William Sturtevant
- Niara Sudarkasa
- Marija Šuštar

== T ==
- Michael Taussig
- Sharika Thiranagama
- Edward Burnett Tylor
- Mark Turin
- Colin Turnbull
- Victor Turner
- Bruce Trigger

== V ==
- Karl Verner
- L. P. Vidyarthi
- Eduardo Viveiros de Castro
- Christoph von Fürer-Haimendorf

== W ==
- Anthony F. C. Wallace
- Lee Henderson Watkins
- Camilla Wedgwood
- Hank Wesselman
- Kath Weston
- Douglas R. White
- Isobel Mary White
- Leslie White
- Tim White
- Benjamin Whorf
- Unni Wikan
- Clark Wissler
- Eric Wolf
- Alvin Wolfe
- Sol Worth

== Y ==
- Nur Yalman
- Kim Yeshi

== Z ==
- Jarrett Zigon
- R. Tom Zuidema

== Fictional anthropologists ==
- Mary Albright (Jane Curtin) in the sitcom 3rd Rock from the Sun
- Temperance "Bones" Brennan (Emily Deschanel) in the television series Bones
- Temperance Brennan in the novel series Temperance Brennan by Kathy Reichs
- Chakotay (Robert Beltran) in the television series Star Trek: Voyager
- Michael Burnham (Sonequa Martin-Green) in the television series Star Trek: Discovery
- Daniel Jackson (Michael Shanks, James Spader) in the television series and film Stargate SG-1
- Charlotte Lewis (Rebecca Mader) in the television series Lost
- Korekiyo Shinguji

== See also ==
- List of female anthropologists
- List of Black Anthropologists
- List of Chinese sociologists and anthropologists
