= List of black anthropologists =

This is a list of black anthropologists.

Name	Description	Birth date	Death date	Image
A. Lynn Bolles	American cultural anthropologist	12 December 1949	8 February 2026	
Aimee Cox	American cultural anthropologist, Dancer			
Alexandra Jones	American archaeologist	1977		
Arthur Fauset	American cultural anthropologist	January 20, 1899	September 2, 1983	
Ashanté M. Reese	American cultural anthropologist			
Bertin M. Louis, Jr.	American cultural anthropologist			
Bianca Williams	American cultural anthropologist	1980		
Caroline Bond Day	American cultural anthropologist	November 18, 1889	May 5, 1948	
Carolyn Rouse	American cultural anthropologist	c. 1965		
Charles Preston Warren	American cultural anthropologist	1921	1987	
Chelsea R. Carter	American cultural and medical anthropologist			
Cheryl R. Rodriguez	American cultural anthropologist			
Christen A. Smith	American cultural anthropologist			
Duana Fullwiley	American cultural anthropologist			
Deandre Miles-Hercules	American linguistic anthropologist	1996		
Deborah A. Thomas	American cultural anthropologist, dancer	1966		
Delmos Jones	American cultural anthropologist	1936	1999	
Diane Katherine Lewis Chaney	American cultural anthropologist	1931	2015	
Donna Auston	American cultural anthropologist			
Edmund T. Gordon	American cultural anthropologist			
Fatimah Jackson	American biological anthropologist			
Faye V. Harrison	American cultural anthropologist	November 25, 1951		
Gina Athena Ulysse	Haitian-American cultural anthropologist			
Glenn Jordan	American cultural anthropologist	April 5, 1936		
Hanna Garth	American cultural anthropologist			
Ira E. Harrison	American medical and applied anthropologist	June 1, 1933	April 27, 2020	
John Langston Gwaltney	American cultural anthropologist	September 25, 1928	August 29, 1998	
John L. Jackson Jr.	American cultural anthropologist			
John Wesley Gilbert	American cultural anthropologist	July 6, 1863	November 18, 1923	
Johnnetta Cole	American cultural anthropologist	October 19, 1936		
Kamari Maxine Clarke	Canadian, American cultural anthropologist	April 3, 1966		
Katherine Dunham	American cultural anthropologist, dancer	June 22, 1909	May 21, 2006	
Laurence Ralph	American cultural anthropologist			
Leith Mullings	American cultural anthropologist	April 8, 1945	December 13, 2020	
Louis Diène Faye	Senegalese anthropologist, author, and scholar of history and religion	February 13, 1936		
Maureen Mahon	American cultural anthropologist			
Michael Blakey	American anthropologist	February 23, 1953		
Michael Ralph	American cultural anthropologist			
Rachel J. Watkins	American biocultural anthropologist			
Riché J. Daniel Barnes	American cultural anthropologist			
Ryan Jobson	American cultural anthropologist			
Jemima Pierre	Haitian-American sociocultural anthropologist			
Savannah Shange	American cultural anthropologist			
Shanti Parikh	American cultural and medical anthropologist			
Solange Ashby	American archaeologist, Egyptologist			
Theresa A. Singleton	American archaeologist	April 15, 1952		
Vera Mae Green	American cultural anthropologist	September 6, 1928	January 16, 1982	
Whitney Battle-Baptiste	American archaeologist			
William Montague Cobb	American archaeologist	October 12, 1904	November 20, 1990	
Willie Baber	American cultural anthropologist			
Woni Spotts	American cross-cultural anthropologist, preservationist, author	January 6, 1964		
Yolanda T. Moses	American cultural anthropologist	1946		
Zora Neale Hurston	American folklorist, novelist, short story writer	January 7, 1891	January 28, 1960	

== See also ==
- List of anthropologists
- List of women anthropologists
