= Binkley =

Binkley is a surname. Notable people with the surname include:

- Gregg Binkley (born 1963), American actor
- Howell Binkley (1956–2020), American lighting designer
- John Binkley (born 1953), American politician
- Leroy Binkley (1922–1994), American architect
- Les Binkley (born 1934), Canadian ice hockey player
- Marian Binkley, Canadian anthropologist
- Pepper Binkley, American actress
- Robert C. Binkley (1897–1940), American historian
- Ross Binkley (1886–1915), Canadian football player
- Ryan Binkley (born 1967), American businessman and politician
- Thomas Binkley (1931–1995), American lutenist and musicologist
- Timothy Binkley (born 1943), American philosopher
- Binkley Brothers American old-time string band

Fictional characters:

- Michael Binkley, character in the cartoon strip Bloom County
