= Black Travel Movement =

The Black Travel Movement is a socioentrepreneurial phenomenon that pursues social change by developing travel-related businesses that encourage Black people to travel. The movement emerged in the 2010s, but in the United States its historical roots go back to The Negro Motorist Green Book and to historically Black resorts.

According to researchers Alana Dillette and Stefanie Benjamin, the movement developed in response to "underrepresentation of Black people in the travel sphere" and is informed by critical race theory. Yes! magazine in 2021 said the movement was "exploding" in size and influence.

== History of Black travel ==
Affluent Black people in the United States first commonly travelled for leisure in the late 1800s via rail and steamship. Those who travelled abroad often commented on the relative sense of freedom they felt when outside of the United States.

Starting in the early 1900s, resorts were created throughout the U.S. to cater to Black travellers who were unable to travel to other resorts because of segregation or racist policies. Resorts included Idlewild, American Beach, Bethune Beach, Oak Bluffs, Bruce's Beach, Lincoln Hills, Pacific Beach Club, Paradise Park, and several subdivisions near Sag Harbor.

The invention of the automobile further increased opportunities for affluent Black Americans to travel, as it removed obstacles of segregation on railroad cars, but travel by car also increased the risk of inadvertently stopping at segregated lodging and dining establishments or driving through a sundown town. In 1936, The Negro Motorist Green Book was created to address this danger.

== Travel and leisure marketing ==
The travel and tourism industry traditionally was marketed exclusively using images of white travelers. According to Dillette and Benjamin, as of 2018, the industry continued to primarily depict white travelers in images. The lack of depictions of people of color, except when seen in service roles, contributes to real and perceived ideas that Black people do not travel.

== Modern movement ==
In 2011, the first Black Travel Movement company, Nomadness, was created by Evita Robinson with the goal of connecting Black people with travel opportunities that had not been previously marketed to Black travelers. As of 2022, Dillette and Benjamin counted 20 such companies, referring them as "social entrepreneurships" because the typical organizational goal, in addition to profit, is effecting social change within the travel sphere.

In the late 2010s, Jessica Nabongo and Woni Spotts both claimed to be the first Black woman to visit every country in the world; the dispute caused "rumblings" within the movement, according to Essence, with some in the movement "attempt[ing] to pit the two women against each other".

== See also ==
- AAA racial discrimination
- Sundown town
