= Spotts =

Spotts is a surname. Notable people with the surname include:

- Frederic Spotts (born 1930), American diplomat and historian
- Jim Spotts (1909–1964), American baseball player
- Ralph Spotts (1875–1924), American sport shooter
- Woni Spotts (born 1964), American anthropologist and record holding traveler

== See also ==
- Potts (surname)
