= McCurdy (surname) =

McCurdy is a Scottish and Irish surname.

== Notable McCurdys ==
The following is a list of notable people with the surname McCurdy:

- Alexander McCurdy, American organist and educator
- Allie Hann-McCurdy, Canadian ice dancer
- Arthur Williams McCurdy, Canadian businessman, inventor and astronomer
- Bob McCurdy (1952–2020), American basketball player
- Brendan McCurdy, American television actor
- Charles McCurdy, British politician
- Charles J. McCurdy, American lawyer, diplomat, and Lieutenant Governor of Connecticut
- Colin McCurdy, Northern Irish Association footballer and manager
- Dave McCurdy, American lawyer and U.S. Representative (D-OK)
- David McCurdy, Canadian merchant and politician
- David W. McCurdy, American anthropologist
- Earle McCurdy, Canadian labour leader
- Ed McCurdy, folk singer, songwriter and television actor
- Elmer McCurdy (1880–1911), an Oklahoma outlaw
- Fleming Blanchard McCurdy, Canadian politician
- George "Spanky" McCurdy, gospel/soul/pop/hip-hop drummer
- Harry McCurdy, U.S. baseball player
- Howard McCurdy, Canadian politician and professor
- Howard E. McCurdy, American professor
- Jennette McCurdy (born 1992), American writer and former actress
- John McCurdy (architect) (1824–1885), Irish architect
- John McCurdy (baseball) born 1981, professional baseball player
- John McCurdy (tennis) (born 1960), Australian tennis pro from the 1980s
- John Alexander Douglas McCurdy, Canadian aviator and lieutenant-governor of Nova Scotia
- Pat McCurdy. American cabaret singer/songwriter
- Rod McCurdy, Australian cricketer
- Roy McCurdy, U.S. jazz drummer
- Ryan McCurdy, Northern Irish footballer
- Ryan E McCurdy, US Theatre Actor, Producer
- Solomon P. McCurdy (1820–1890), justice of the Supreme Court of the Utah Territory
- William F. McCurdy, Canadian merchant and politician

== See also ==
- MacCurdy
- Macurdy
