= Michal Josephy =

Czech anthropologist, photographer and publicist

- Born: 20 June 1977 (age 49)
- Education: General Anthropology
- Alma mater: Charles University
- Occupation: Anthropologist
- Relatives: Karel Josephy grandfather

Michal Josephy (born 1977) is an American anthropologist, traveller, adventurer, humanitarian and street photographer, travel and science journalist and lecturer of science journalism and visual anthropology at Faculty of Humanities, Charles University, Prague.

== Biography ==
Michal Josephy is the grandson of Karel Josephy, the Chief executive officer of Tobacco Factory in Tábor, Bohemia. This factory, built during Alexander Seik ´s mayorship, was the largest industrial enterprise in South Bohemian Region (1888 - 1953), one of the largest in Austro-Hungarian Empire, and the division of Tobacco industry where women workers were exclusively employed. He is a patrilinear descent of Anton Josephy, the city and criminal council and Bernart Yozeff, the owner and builder of the oldest surviving and exceptionally valuable inscription of mill establishing in Bohemia which is engraved in sandstone, late renaissance portal (1541).

== Career ==
Anthropologist focused on visual anthropology anthropology of supermodernity and anthropology of body, beauty and fashion. As an anthropologist, he collaborated with economic historian John Komlos on National Geographic (magazine) project How Czech People Grow. As an anthropologist and photographer he created the project WWWomen aiming at world - wide women's beauty. He is also the author of several publications of UNICEF Mozambique, visual background of song Sofrimento by Neyma feat. Stewart Sukuma, headline poster for campaign End Violence by Goodwill Ambassador for UNICEF, Liam Neeson, Millie Bobby Brown and campaigns Day of the Girl focused on violence against adolescent girls and against child marriage. As a travel journalist and science writer he works for National Geographic CZ, TV Prima ZOOM, Czech Airlines and Travel Service in - flight magazines. He was one of the first photojournalists who covered infamous Scampia, the no - go zone managed by Camorra, long before Gomorrah (TV series). As lifestyle journalist he collaborated with Elle (magazine), Vogue (magazine), Harper's Bazaar and ForMen. He also serves as curator of memorial books of Tobacco Factory in Tabor (1874 - 1953).

== Travels ==
In 2017 Josephy visited more than 100 countries and passed the requirements to join the prestigious Travelers' Century Club. He travelled through the most parts of Portuguese Empire from Brazil, Goa, Macau, Malacca City to Japan and in the footsteps of French poet, adventurer and merchant Arthur Rimbaud from his birth - place Charleville-Mézières to Harar in Ethiopia.

== Awards ==
As a photographer, he is the winner of "Europe´s biggest and most prestigious photography competition" Prix de la Photographie Paris 2013, People's Choice Awards and Silver Prize PX3. Bronze Prize at Tokyo Photo Awards 2016 (conflict - editorial), finalist of "Henri Awards" (International Street Photography Awards, San Francisco, USA), finalist of London Street Photography Festival and Photographer of the Year, ATOD Magazine. His photographic work was published in PX3 books, and exhibited in galleries like Harvey Milk Photocenter, San Francisco, USA, Espace Dupon, Espace Beaurepaire Paris, Le Magasin de Jouets Galerie, Arles, Owada Gallery, Tokyo, Japan, Karlovy Vary International Film Festival, Instituto Camões, Prague and Faculty of Arts, Palacký University, Olomouc. His selected fine - art photographies are in private collections, mainly in USA and Czech Republic.
