= Patrick Gray =

Patrick Gray may refer to:

- J. Patrick Gray, American anthropologist
- L. Patrick Gray (1916–2005), former Director of the FBI
- Patrick Gray, 4th Lord Gray (died 1584)
- Patrick Gray, 5th Lord Gray (died 1608), Scottish landowner
- Patrick Gray, 6th Lord Gray (died 1612)
- Paddy Gray (footballer) (1872–?), Scottish footballer
