= Checkered Past (album) =

Studio album by L.A. Guns
- Released: November 12, 2021
- Recorded: 2020–2021
- Studio: Remote locations
- Genres: Hard rock, sleaze metal
- Length: 44:48
- Label: Frontiers
- Producer: Tracii Guns

L.A. Guns chronology
The Devil You Know (2019)	Checkered Past (2021)	Black Diamonds (2023)

Singles from Checkered Past
- 1. "Let You Down" Released: May 6, 2020; 2. "Knock Me Down" Released: August 16, 2021; 3. "Cannonball" Released: September 16, 2021; 4. "Get Along" Released: October 22, 2021

Checkered Past is the thirteenth studio album by American hard rock band L.A. Guns, released on November 12, 2021, through Frontiers Records.

== Background and recording ==
Checkered Past was written and recorded during the COVID-19 pandemic. Because of travel restrictions and lockdowns, the band members could not record together in a single studio. Instead, guitarist Tracii Guns tracked his guitar parts in Denmark, while vocalist Phil Lewis recorded his vocals in Las Vegas, with other band members tracking their respective instruments remotely.

The album marks the third consecutive studio release featuring the reunited classic lineup of Guns and Lewis, following The Missing Peace (2017) and The Devil You Know (2019). Tracii Guns described the record as a natural progression of their reunited chemistry, noting that the album splits into a heavier, dark side and a more melodic, classic blues-rock side.

In May 2020, L.A. Guns released a new single called, "Let You Down". The track was written and recorded during the COVID-19 quarantine across different continents while the band was in the midst of working on its next studio album. The song was released early as a standalone single due to how much the band loved the haunting ballad. Vocalist Phil Lewis told MetalTalk that "Let You Down" is a deep haunted work and words from a tormented soul. Under normal circumstances, it would have been recorded in a more traditional way, but somehow the isolation adds to the atmosphere of this very cool song.

The album was officially announced alongside the release of its lead single, "Knock Me Down", in August 2021. Two additional singles, "Cannonball" and "Get Along", were released prior to the full album launch on November 12, 2021, through Frontiers Records.

== Critical reception ==
Professional ratings
Review scores
Source	Rating
Blues Rock Review	8/10 stars
Dangerdog Music Review	4.5/5 stars
Metal Storm	5.8/10
The Rockpit	Positive

Checkered Past received generally positive reviews from music critics. Writing for The Rockpit, Ben Creagh stated that of the three albums released since the band's core reunion, "Checkered Past is the one that really nails it for me," praising its mix of classic rock swagger, bluesy crawls, and punk-infused energy. Bob Donenfeld of Blues Rock Review highlighted the chemistry of the band, writing that "L.A. Guns aren't trying to do anything new" but rather excels at capturing the exact signature sound their fans expect. Craig Hartranft of Dangerdog Music Review commended vocalist Phil Lewis for maintaining a balance between "hard rock gusto and punk nastiness," concluding that the record is a "terrific album of the band's signature and consistent melodic hard rock". Conversely, Metal Storm provided a more tempered, mixed assessment, rating it a 5.8 out of 10.

== Track listing ==
No.	Title	Length
1.	"Cannonball"	3:28
2.	"Bad Luck Charm"	4:00
3.	"Living Right Now"	3:32
4.	"Get Along"	5:30
5.	"If It's Over Now"	4:19
6.	"Better Than You"	3:50
7.	"Knock Me Down"	4:07
8.	"Dog"	3:00
9.	"Let You Down"	5:36
10.	"That Ain't Why"	3:35
11.	"Physical Itch"	3:52
Total length:		44:48

== Personnel ==
Credits adapted from the album's liner notes.

L.A. Guns

- Phil Lewis – lead vocals
- Tracii Guns – lead guitar, production
- Ace Von Johnson – rhythm guitar, backing vocals
- Johnny Martin – bass, backing vocals
- Scot Coogan – drums, backing vocals

Production

- Tracii Guns – producer
- Adam Hamilton – mixing, mastering
- Mitch Shults – engineering assistance
