= David W. McCurdy =

American anthropologist (born 1935)

David Whitwell McCurdy (born 1935) is an American anthropologist best known for founding the anthropology department at Macalester College.

David W. McCurdy was born in 1935 to Henry Benson McCurdy and his wife, both of Montrose, Illinois. He received a B.A. in anthropology from Cornell University in 1957, followed by an M.A. from Stanford University in 1959, and a Ph.D. in anthropology from Cornell in 1964. From 1961 to 1963, he completed an ethnography of a Bhil community in Rajasthan, India. After graduating with his doctorate, McCurdy taught at Colorado State University for two years before teaching anthropology at Macalester College in Saint Paul, Minnesota, beginning in 1966. Between 1968 and 1973, he conducted ethnographies of an environmental movement and of Jehovah's Witnesses. In 1976, he founded the department of anthropology at Macalester.

At Macalester, McCurdy and James P. Spradley were profiled in Change: The Magazine of Higher Learning in 1978 for their then-innovative use of case studies and field study as teaching strategies. McCurdy and Spradley required their students to complete an ethnography in the field, exposing them to the practice of ethnography while still undergraduates and de-emphasizing exotic cultures as subjects of these ethnographies. Anthro Notes, published by the Smithsonian Institution, asserted in a 1992 article that McCurdy and Spradley's approach allows students to learn the theory of anthropology while applying it via ethnography. Through the 1980s and 1990s, McCurdy supplemented his teaching with ethnographic studies of stockbrokers, corporate managers, and a national motorcycle association.

From its first issue in Fall 1994 until 2015, McCurdy served with Patricia Rice as co-editor of the American Anthropological Association (AAA) journal General Anthropology. In 1997, McCurdy was co-recipient (with Barbara Joans) of the first-ever AAA Excellence in Undergraduate Teaching Award.

McCurdy "semi-retired" from Macalester in 2000, and retired in 2005. He remains a professor emeritus.

In 2024, the 16th edition of McCurdy and Spradley's Conformity and Conflict: Readings in Cultural Anthropology was published by Waveland Press. The 15th edition, published by Pearson Education in 2015, had added Dianna Shandy as an author. The textbook, originally published by Little, Brown and Company in 1971, is used as a text in college courses across the United States.

The anthropology department at Macalester has established several initiatives named after McCurdy, including the David W. McCurdy Award for Excellence in Anthropological Research, presented to one student annually, and the McCurdy Distinguished Lecture, which invites one scholar to the campus each year. Notable McCurdy Lecturers have included Jack Weatherford, Leo Chavez, Mark Turin, and Nadia Abu El-Haj.

McCurdy is married to Carolyn Durham; their daughter, Victoria, was born in 1960.
