= MacCurdy =

MacCurdy is a surname. Notable people with the surname include:

- George Grant MacCurdy, American anthropologist
- Jean MacCurdy, American television executive
- John T. MacCurdy, Canadian psychiatrist
- William K. MacCurdy, American engineer

== See also ==
- Samuel MacCurdy Greer, Irish politician
- Macurdy, surname
- McCurdy (surname)
