= Deaf Like Me =

1979 book by Thomas and James Spradley

- Author: Thomas Spradley, James Spradley, Lynn Spradley
- Publisher: Random House, Gallaudet University Press
- Publication date: 1979

Deaf Like Me is a biographical book about a family who discovers their daughter, Lynn, is deaf, and deals with a language barrier. It was written by Thomas and James Spradley, Lynn's father and uncle, and originally published in 1979. It begins in November 1964, before Lynn was born, and ends in August 1975, when she was ten. A short epilogue by Lynn, 19-years-old, is included in the 1985 edition.

== Background and publication ==
This biography focuses on Tom and Louise Spradley, their children Bruce and Lynn, and the friends and family they interact with on their journey. The book begins in 1964 when the Spradley's are moving from Illinois to Minnesota and Bruce is an only child. Tom is a teacher and is willing to take a job in any city offered, so he and his family move from Illinois, to Minnesota, to Oklahoma, and finally to California, where most of Lynn's schooling takes place. Louise is a stay at home parent, so she is flexible to move around the country without many issues.

Deaf Like Me was originally published as a hardcover edition by Random House in 1979. The paperback edition was published in 1985 by Gallaudet University Press, with the addition of Lynn Spradley's epilogue.

== Main characters ==
- Tom Spradley is the father of Bruce and Lynn and married to Louise and also the narrator of this story. He is a mathematics teacher at the college level and for a short time, the high school level. When the book begins, Tom is working at Wheaton College in Illinois and works there for four years. However, over the course of the book, he also works at Carleton College in Minnesota, University of Oklahoma, Northview High School and American River College, both in California. Tom is the sole provider for the Spradley family, since he is the only one with a paying job.
- Louise Spradley is the mother of Bruce and Lynn and married to Tom. She is a stay at home mom who takes care of her children and occasionally paints. Louise's role as a stay at home mom is crucial because she is able to devote so much of her time to working with Lynn and teaching her how to lip-read. Her role as a stay at home mom enables their family to move around the country without many limitations.
- Bruce Spradley is the son of Tom and Louise and the brother of Lynn. His role in this book is fairly minimal but he experienced a similar life to the rest of his family. Bruce is about four years older than Lynn and seems to have had a relatively normal childhood. He is adaptable and is able to make new friends regardless of the state he lives in. Also, Bruce helps teach his sister to lip-read and learn sign language.
- Lynn Spradley is the daughter of Tom and Louise, the sister of Bruce, and is also the main character and reason behind the creation of this biography. Lynn was born profoundly deaf due to her mother's exposure to rubella early in her pregnancy. There is nothing mentally or physically wrong with Lynn besides the fact that she cannot hear.

== Plot ==
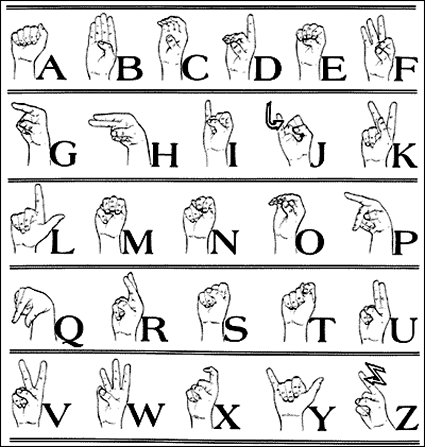
American Sign Language Alphabet

In 1964, Bruce, who was only around three years old, contracted rubella or German measles. In 1964 and 1965, there was a large rubella outbreak where “20,000 babies were born with congenital rubella syndrome” and the vaccination was not put in use until 1969. Bruce quickly recovered, however, Tom and Louise are concerned that if Louise is pregnant and contracted the illness, it could cause their child to have birth defects like the doctor warned them.

In April 1965, Louise gave birth to Lynn and the doctor performed various tests and assured the Spradley's that Lynn was perfectly healthy. Every newborn baby now has their hearing screened before they leave the hospital, however, this procedure was not put into place until 1993. Tom and Louise accepted the doctor's assessment and continued on with their lives until the Fourth of July, they became concerned because Lynn was not bothered by the wailing fire trucks or the bursting fireworks.

When she was 16 months old, Lynn's hearing was tested at the John Tracy Clinic and she was found to be profoundly deaf. Once Lynn's deafness is proven to be true, Tom and Louise begin teaching her how to lip-read as opposed to how to sign. Oralism, which only allows children to speak not sign, was popular because people believed deaf children could one day talk just as well as hearing children.

Before Lynn was old enough to get a hearing aid, she used an auditory trainer, consisting of headphones, a microphone, and a control box, all used to amplify sounds. Once she was the right age, Lynn received a hearing aid that took time for her to get accustomed to, but unfortunately did not provide much assistance. The point of both the auditory trainer and the hearing aids were for Lynn to learn how to use her residual hearing, the small amount of hearing abilities even someone with hearing loss has.

As Lynn got older, communication continued to become more of an issue for her and her family. She would have tantrums when those around her could not figure out what she was asking for. Tom and Louise attended meetings at her schools and found that other parents had similar issues with communication but had not found many ways to resolve them.

A few months before Lynn turned five, Tom and Louise began to realize that despite many years of lip-reading and trying to get their daughter to talk, she could only speak a few words and only lip-read common words. The Spradley's decided they wanted more for Lynn, so they began to learn sign language from some of their deaf friends. The whole family quickly picked up the language and realized how easy it now was to communicate with Lynn. She continued to learn to lip-read, but signing only improved Lynn's abilities.

== Epilogue ==
The epilogue, included at the back of the book in the paperback edition, was written by Lynn Spradley in 1985. In the epilogue, she mostly talks about the school she attended after learning sign language. Lynn went to a residential school for the deaf, from age twelve to age nineteen, when she wrote this piece. Lynn mentions that she is glad she was given the opportunity to learn sign language and states, “Deaf kids are just as smart as hearing kids. With sign language deaf kids can do anything.”
