= Philip Lewis =

Philip Lewis or Phil Lewis or Phillip Lewis may refer to:

- Philip Lewis Sr. (c. 1751–1836), American pioneer, soldier, and politician
- Philip D. Lewis (1924–2017), Canadian politician
- Philip H. Lewis Jr. (1925–2017), American professor of landscape architecture
- Philip J. Lewis (1900–1985), Canadian lawyer and politician in Newfoundland
- Phil Henderson (writer) (born 1967), also writing as Philip Lewis, American novelist, illustrator, essayist, and poet
- Phil Lewis (baseball) (1883–1959), American baseball player
- Phil Lewis (cricketer) (born 1981), English cricketer
- Phil Lewis (Florida politician) (Philip D. Lewis, 1929–2012) American politician in Florida
- Phil Lewis (musician) (born 1957), English vocalist for the American band L.A. Guns
- Phill Lewis (born 1968), American actor, comedian, and director
- Phillip Harold Lewis (1922–2011), American anthropologist and museologist
- Phil Lewis (rugby union) (born 1961), Welsh rugby union international

== See also ==
- Philip Louis (disambiguation)
