= Aimee Cox =

African American anthropologist

Aimee Meredith Cox is an American cultural anthropologist, former dancer, and choreographer.

Her research interests include feminism, social justice, and the intersections of race, class, gender, and sexuality. She is currently associate professor of anthropology and African American studies and director of undergraduate studies at Yale University. She also serves as professor of African and African American Studies at Fordham University. Cox received her BA in anthropology in 1994 from Vassar College and her PhD in Cultural Anthropology in 2006 from University of Michigan.

From 2001 to 2004, Cox served as a director of a Detroit homeless shelter for young women called Alternatives for Girls, where she did her fieldwork while completing her PhD in anthropology at the University of Michigan. Working at the shelter, Cox studied the impact of race, class, gender, and sexuality on the lives of black women. As part of her work, Cox used dance, poetry, and music to reach out to young women and offer creative outlets of expression. In 2005, Cox created the BlackLight Project for the residents of the shelter who wanted to expand their creative experimentation with music and dance to communicate their personal experiences. During the BlackLight Project which received the Kellogg Foundation grant, Cox helped shelter residence to write down, communicate, and connect their personal stories. Cox touts her experience directing the shelter and the BlackLight Project as inspiration for her book, Shapeshifters: Black Girls and Choreography of Citizenship (Duke University Press, 2015) that won several awards including the 2017 book award from the Society for the Anthropology of North America and a 2016 Victor TurnerBook Prize in Ethnographic Writing.

After completing her fieldwork at Alternatives for Girls and obtaining her PhD, Cox began teaching at Rutgers University–Newark. In 2009, Cox, along with 15 young female leaders, brought the BlackLight project to Newark. In 2011, Cox began working at Fordham University as an assistant professor of cultural anthropology. In 2017, Cox joined Yale University as an associate professor of Anthropology and African American Studies.

In addition to her work as an anthropologist, Cox is also a dancer and choreographer who once performed and toured with Ailey II and the Dance Theatre of Harlem (DHT). She is also on the editorial board of both The Feminist Wire and Public: A Journal of Imagining America. Additionally, she also serves as an executive board member of the Association of Black Anthropologists (ABA) where she was a co-editor of Transforming Anthropology, the journal of ABA.

== Personal life ==
Aimee Cox has acknowledged her family for helping and motivating her to pursue her scholarly and academic interests. She dedicated both her PhD dissertation and book Shapeshifters to her sister, Jennifer, whose life was infused with the stories of the young women she encountered at the Detroit shelter. In her dissertation, Cox also credits her sister for encouraging her to write about and interrogate her personal experiences to identify herself as an individual.

== Education ==
Aimee Cox completed her undergraduate studies at Vassar College, where she received a B.A. in anthropology in 1994. While attending Vassar College, Cox remained actively involved in dance which she states was a major part of her college experience. When Cox was given the option to graduate yearly in 1992 because of her extra college credits, she opted instead to study for a semester at the Dance Theatre of Harlem (DTH), the first black ballet company. While studying at DTH, she was supported by Lowell Smith, a principal dancer at DTH, who encouraged and advised her to apply to study at the Ailey School, where soon after she was accepted. She credits her experience learning at Ailey with helping her understand “how dance is about spirit, tradition, and culture.” After studying dance at Ailey School, Cox was also given the opportunity to return and perform professionally.

After receiving her bachelor's degree from Vassar, Cox went on to receive her PhD in cultural anthropology from the University of Michigan (1998–2006). During her PhD studies, Cox began her fieldwork at Alternatives for Girls, a homeless shelter for young women in Detroit where she examined the intersections of gender, sexuality, race, and class on the lives of these women. After spending four years conducting fieldwork at the homeless shelter, Cox wrote about these experiences in her PhD dissertation "You Can Do Better!" Marginalized Black Girls and the Performance of Respectability, an ethnography that outlined and examined the narratives of the young women she encountered during her fieldwork at the Detroit shelter.

== Career ==
Before becoming a professor, Aimee Cox was a professional dancer, and toured with The Alvin Ailey Repertory Ensemble/Ailey II. She volunteered at Alternatives for Girls in Detroit, then became the director of the homeless shelter from 2002 to 2005. She wrote about her time working at the shelter in her book Shapeshifters: Black Girls and the Choreography of Citizenship. From 2008 to 2011, she worked at Rutgers University, where she continued the BlackLight Project that she started with the girls from AFG. She also became a part of the African and African American Studies Department at Fordham University, working as an assistant professor. At Yale University she worked in the Anthropology and African American Studies department as an associate professor.

== Awards ==
In 2016, Aimee Cox's book, Shapeshifters: Black Girls and the Choreography of Citizenship, won the Victor Turner Book Prize in Ethnographic Writing. It was also an Honorable mention for the Gloria E. Anzaldúa book Prize. She was honored as the 2017 Woman of the Year by the Colorado Springs Chamber of Commerce & EDC. She was also awarded the Malkiel Scholarship by the Woodrow Wilson National Fellowship Foundation in 2018. In 2021, she became one of four recipients of the Poorvu Family Fund for Academic Innovation award from Yale College.

== Organizations and groups ==
Aimee Cox is a fellow for the Black Atlantic Ecologies project at Columbia's Center for the Study of Social Difference. The project considers how Black experiences with peril, punishment, and premature death can provide a rubric for futurity in environmental collapse. She has also been a part of Black Women Artists for Black Lives Matter, a collective concerned with highlighting pervasive conditions of racism. The group held an event at the New Museum in 2016. Cox was a faculty fellow at the Center for Experimental Ethnography at the University of Pennsylvania in 2019, holding an interactive ritual performance there.

== Written works ==
=== Major publications ===
In 2015, Cox published her first book Shapeshifters, an ethnographic study of young Black women in Detroit, aged 15–22. Based on her work in a homeless shelter, Cox explores how young Black women move around the social conditions that restrict them, a process called shapeshifting. Visual shapeshifting is defined as choreography, and this includes storytelling, physicality, appearance, and responses to social conditions themselves. Cox also interacts with one family, the Brown family, quite extensively, revealing the ways in which family structure has also been subverted due to the lack of male responsibility within the household. Through these experiences, Cox composes a narrative about the ways in which young Black women seek redemption through choreography.

Cox is currently working on a project called "Living Past Slow Death," consisting of two book projects based on research in Cincinnati, Ohio; Jackson, Mississippi; Clarksburg, West Virginia; and Bedford-Stuyvesant, Brooklyn.

=== Minor publications ===
Cox has written several minor publications in addition to Shapeshifters. Her most notable work, The Body and the City Project: Young Black Women Making Space, Community, and Love in Newark, New Jersey, is a feminist ethnography which draws on the work she had done in Detroit. Similar to Shapeshifters, she explores the intersectionality of race, gender, class, and place in telling the stories of the women in Newark. She also contributed to the publication Oracular Practice, Crip Bodies and the Poetry of Collaboration, a collaborative piece on oracular practice stemming from involvement in the Tiresias project at the University of Michigan-Ann Arbor. She wrote a book review for the books In Between Good and Ghetto: African American Girls and Inner-City Violence and Why Girls Fight: Female Youth Violence in the Inner City for the journal Signs: Journal of Women in Culture & Society. Last year, she collaborated on a drama review of Fremde Tänze, a performance by Nelisiwe Xaba. As a frequent collaborator on Transforming Anthropology, she published a work titled Can Anthropology Get Free? in 2020. Additionally, she published several editorials during her time as an editor.

=== Writer's profile ===
Aimee Cox's written work is both an extension of her field of study and her interest in dance. From an anthropological perspective, she studies the intersectionality race, location, class, and gender through the lens of performance. Her work in Detroit has informed much of her written works from Shapeshifters to several minor publications. She also studies performance more closely as well, tying in her own experiences with performance to other performances that she observes. Her work serves to not only tell the stories of Black women but create an academic space to explore the relationship between performance and intersectionality, specifically concerning Black women. Given the ethnographic nature of her work, much of it is a performance itself, one that reshapes the narrative concerning Black women.
