= Macurdy =

Macurdy is a surname. Notable people with the name include:

- Grace Macurdy (1866–1946), American classicist
- John Macurdy (1929–2020), American operatic singer
- Thomas MaCurdy, American economics professor

== See also ==
- MacCurdy
- McCurdy (surname)
