= Philip Louis =

Philip Louis may refer to:

- Philip Louis, Count Palatine of Neuburg or Philip Ludwig, (1547–1614)
- Philip Louis II, Count of Hanau-Münzenberg or Philip Ludwig, (1576–1612)
- Philip Louis, Duke of Schleswig-Holstein-Sonderburg-Wiesenburg (1620–1689)

== See also ==
- Philip Lewis (disambiguation)
