= Jessica Nabongo =

Ugandan-American travel blogger

Jessica Nambowa Damarie Nassaka Nabongo is a Ugandan American travel blogger and author who gained public attention in 2019 after having visited every country in the world. Her assertion she was the first Black woman to have done so was disputed.

== Early life and education ==
Nabongo was born in Detroit, Michigan to Rose Mary Namubiru and Ephraim Mukasa Nabongo, Ugandans who settled in the United States in 1969; she has dual citizenship. Her mother is from Mbale, in Eastern Uganda and her father grew up on the outskirts of the Ugandan capital, Kampala. According to Nabongo, she received her first passport at the age of four or five.

She attended St. John's University in New York City where she obtained a Bachelor of Arts degree in English and then the London School of Economics, where she acquired a social sciences Master's degree in international development.

== Career ==
After completing college, she worked at a pharmaceutical company for two years, taught English in Japan and worked for the United Nations' Food and Agriculture Organization.

As of 2016, she had already visited 60 countries. In February 2017 she decided to visit all 193 UN member countries and the two nonmember observing states of the world. She arrived at the 195th country on her list, the Seychelles, on 6 October 2019, at the age of 35. She documented each of her visits to a new country on her blog. The informal certification group Nomad Mania accepted her claim through their random spot checks.

Nabongo notes that there is some controversy over her record as she was unable to enter Syria and instead chose to visit the Golan Heights, which the United Nations Security Council considers to be Syrian territory occupied by Israel. Her claim of being the first Black woman to visit every country was also disputed by Woni Spotts.

Nabongo founded a travel agency called Jet Black, which created itineraries for small group trips to Africa. She has also worked with hospitality businesses as a brand influencer. She wrote a book detailing her travels, titled The Catch Me If You Can.

== See also ==
- Black Travel Movement
- Ugandan Americans
