= Igor Gorevich =

Russian anthropologist

Igor Gorevich is a Russian anthropologist, the author of the three volume text O Kritike Antropologii Zhivotnikh (Towards a critique of animal anthropology), published in 1987. Animal anthropology is the study of animals as they are used or interpreted within human culture, as opposed to the study of animals directly, as in zoology or animal behavior. His texts have been cited within scholarly books and journals

== Bibliography ==
- O Kritike Antropologii Zhivotnikh (Towards a Critique of Animal Anthropology). Vol. 1, Prichasheniye i Shashlik. Kabul: Kishinev, 1987.
- O Kritike Antropologii Zhivotnikh (Towards a Critique of Animal Anthropology). Vol. 2, Zvyeri i Anektoti. Kabul: Kishinev, 1987.
- O Kritike Antropologii Zhivotnikh (Towards a Critique of Animal Anthropology). Vol. 3, O Kentavrah i Rusalkah: Raznovidnosti i Granitsy (Of Centaurs and Mermaids: Boundaries and Species). Kabul: Kishinev, 1987.

== Works translated by Gorevich ==
- "Ordeals by cold water and hot water or iron, from several manuscripts dating from the tenth to thirteenth century" (ed. Karl Zeumer, Formulae merowingici et karolini aevi [MGH Leges 5, Hannover, 1886], 643-644, 644-645 (formulae BIII.1-2)
