= Jarrett Zigon =

American philosopher

Education
- Education: University of Delaware (BA); St. John's College (MA); CUNY Graduate Center (PhD)

Philosophical work
- Institutions: University of Virginia, University of Amsterdam, Max Planck Institute for Social Anthropology
- Main interests: Phenomenology, Hermeneutics, continental philosophy, Ethics, philosophical anthropology, political theory

Jarrett Zigon is a social theorist, philosopher and anthropologist at the University of Virginia, where he is the William & Linda Porterfield Chair in Bioethics and Professor of Anthropology. From 2018 to 2020, he was the founding director of the Center for Data Ethics and Justice at the University of Virginia. Previously, he had been at the University of Amsterdam and the Max Planck Institute for Social Anthropology.

== Biography ==
Zigon received an M.A. in liberal arts from St. John's College (1998) and a Ph.D. in anthropology from the Graduate Center of the City University of New York (2006). He subsequently was a member of the Institute for Advanced Study, Princeton, a visiting scholar at Columbia University, and a research fellow at the Max Planck Institute for Social Anthropology. His research has been funded through a Fulbright-Hays Fellowship, the Netherlands Organization for Scientific Research (NWO), and the European Research Council (ERC), among others.

== Research ==
Zigon is best known for his writing on ethics, bioethics, and political theory – most particularly for his conceptions of moral breakdown, moral assemblages, attunement, dwelling, and relational ethics. These writings have primarily addressed the topics of social and political change, the war on drugs, addiction, mental health, and artificial intelligence/data science. Zigon's work has had a major influence on the anthropology of ethics, critical bioethics, and phenomenological and hermeneutic approaches to ethics and politics.

Zigon is committed to an ongoing conversation between anthropology and philosophy. He is particularly recognized for articulating an anthropology strongly influenced by post-Heideggerian continental philosophy and critical theory, the theoretical articulation of which he describes as critical hermeneutics.

He has contributed several articles to openDemocracy on addiction, the war on drugs, and political activism.

== Bibliography ==
=== Books ===
- How is it between us? Relational Ethics and Care for the World. Chicago: HAU Books. 2024.
- A War on People: Drug User Politics and a New Ethics of Community. Oakland: University of California Press. 2019.
- Disappointment: Toward a Critical Hermeneutics of Worldbuilding. New York: Fordham University Press. 2018.
- HIV is God's Blessing Rehabilitating Morality in Neoliberal Russia. Berkeley: University of California Press. 2011.
- Making the New Post-Soviet Person: Moral Experience in Contemporary Moscow. Leiden: Brill. 2010.
- Morality: An Anthropological Perspective. Oxford: Berg Publishers. 2008.

=== Articles ===
- "Can Machines Be Ethical?: On the Necessity of Relational Ethics and Empathic Attunement for Data-Centric Technologies," in Social Research: An International Quarterly, volume 86, number 4. 2019.
- "What is a situation?: an assemblic ethnography of the drug war," in Cultural Anthropology, volume 30, number 3. 2015.
- "An Ethics of Dwelling and a Politics of World-Building: A Critical Response to Ordinary Ethics," in Journal of the Royal Anthropological Institute, 20, pages 746–64. 2014.
- "Maintaining the 'Truth:' performativity, human rights, and the limitations on politics," in Theory and Event, volume 17, number 3. 2014.
- "Temporalization and Ethical Action," in Journal of Religious Ethics, volume 42, number 3. 2014.
- "Attunement and Fidelity: Two Ontological Conditions for Morally Being-in-the-World," in Ethos, volume 42, number 1. 2014.
- "Moral breakdown and the ethical demand: A theoretical framework for an anthropology of moralities," in Anthropological Theory, volume 7, number 2. 2007
