= Marian Binkley =

Canadian anthropologist

Academic background
- Education: Bachelor of Arts (1973); Master of Arts (1975); PhD in Anthropology (1981)
- Alma mater: University of Toronto
- Thesis: Bio-cultural Implications of Outport Life: The Anglican Parish of Fogo: A Case Study (1981)

Academic work
- Discipline: Anthropologist
- Institutions: Dalhousie University

Marian Binkley is a Canadian anthropologist who was the Dean of the Faculty of Arts and Social Sciences at Dalhousie University from 1999 to 2010. She is professor emeritus at Dalhousie's Department of Anthropology and Social Anthropology.

== Education and career ==
Binkley graduated from the University of Toronto with a Bachelor of Arts in 1973, a Master of Arts in 1975, and a PhD in Anthropology in 1981. Her research primarily focuses on Maritime communities, particularly concerning the socioeconomic and cultural impacts of the fishing industry. Her books include Voices From Off Shore (1994) and Risks, Dangers and Rewards (1995), which explore the working conditions within Nova Scotia's deep sea fishing fleet; and Set Adrift: Fishing Families (2002), which examines the impact of the Atlantic Canadian fisheries crisis on fishermen's households. Binkley has contributed to international development projects concerning resource management in the West Indies, Indonesia, and the Philippines.

From 1999 to 2010, Binkley was the Dean of the Faculty of Arts and Social Sciences at Dalhousie University. She is professor emeritus at the university's Department of Anthropology and Social Anthropology.

== Books ==
- Binkey, Marian (1994). Voices From Off Shore: Narratives of Risk and Danger in the Nova Scotia Deep Sea Fishery. St. John's, NL: Institute of Social and Economic Research. ISBN 978-0-9196-6676-4.
- — (1995). Risk, Dangers and Rewards in the Nova Scotia Offshore Fishery. Montreal: McGill–Queen's University Press. ISBN 978-0-7735-1313-6.
- — (2002). Set Adrift: Fishing Families. Toronto: University of Toronto Press. ISBN 978-0-8020-4812-7.
- —; Neis, Barbara; Gerard, Sirl; Menez, Christina (2005). Changing Tides: Gender, Globalization and World Fisheries. Halifax, N.S.: Fernwood Publishing. ISBN 978-1-5526-6159-8.
