= Moni Nag =

Indian anthropologist

Moni Nag (1925 – 7 December 2015) was an Indian anthropologist specialising in the politics of sexuality.

== Education and career ==
Born in India, Nag earned a master's degree in statistics from the University of Calcutta in 1946 and a PhD in anthropology from Yale University in 1961. He started his career in the Indian Statistical Institute and worked on the Anthropological Survey of India before joining the Department of Anthropology at Columbia University in New York in 1966; he was a lecturer and later an adjunct professor and headed the social demography section in the International Institute for the Study of Human Reproduction. He was also a senior associate in the Population Council in New York and a patron and vice president of the Elmhirst Institute of Community Studies at Santiniketan, and served as chair of the population commission in the International Union of Anthropological and Ethnological Sciences.

== Research and publications ==
Nag was a pioneer of demographic anthropology. He researched and published in the fields of human sexuality, fertility, family planning, HIV prevention, and sex work, with a focus on India, and both studied and worked for the rights of prostitutes in the Kolkata red-light district of Sonagachi; he was one of several academics working with the Durbar Mahila Samanwaya Committee there.

=== Selected books ===
- Factors Affecting Human Fertility in Nonindustrial Societies: A Cross-Cultural Study (Yale University, 1962)
- Population and Social Organization (editor; Mouton, 1975)
- Sexual Behaviour and AIDS in India (Vikas, 1996)
- Sex Workers of India: Diversity in Practice of Prostitution and Ways of Life (Allied Publishers, 2006)
