= Delmos Jones =

African American anthropologist

Delmos J. Jones
- Born: Browns, Alabama, U.S.
- Died: February 3, 1999 Aged 63; East Durham, New York U.S.
- Education: San Francisco State College (BA), University of Arizona (MA), Cornell University (PhD)
- Occupation: Anthropologist
- Spouse: Mary Lou

Delmos J. Jones (1936–1999) was an African American anthropologist who devoted his intellectual career to working for social justice for all peoples. Delmos Jones identified with the political marginality and socioeconomic struggles of his subjects and sought ways to direct anthropological research toward the dismantling of oppression and inequality.

Jones is most remembered for his work on the ethics of basic research and his theoretical arguments concerning native anthropology. He was dissatisfied with the way theoretical paradigms, praxis, and outcomes in anthropological research were supportive of, or neutral to, oppressive ends. In the place of these practices and outcomes, he envisioned a praxis strongly committed to the goals of justice and equality for oppressed populations. His research interests ranged from the Lahu—a hill tribe in Northern Thailand—to the Australian Aborigines, to community organizing among poor people in the United States, but he focused throughout on problems of inequality and the rights of oppressed groups. Jones died of cancer on February 3, 1999, at his home in East Durham, NY.

== Early life and education ==
Jones was born in 1936 to sharecroppers on a farm near the small town of Browns, Alabama, twenty miles west of Selma. He was the fourth of five children, all picking cotton and working on the farm. The family lived a modest rural life and relocated as needed to find work. Jones's father worked off season to fill the gaps. The family moved around the South and traveled as far as California. As a poor black boy in the Jim Crow South, Jones's access to learning opportunities and materials was very limited, so at age fifteen, to pursue his education beyond the segregated Dallas County Training School in Beloit, Alabama, Jones traveled by bus to join his older sister in Oakland, CA

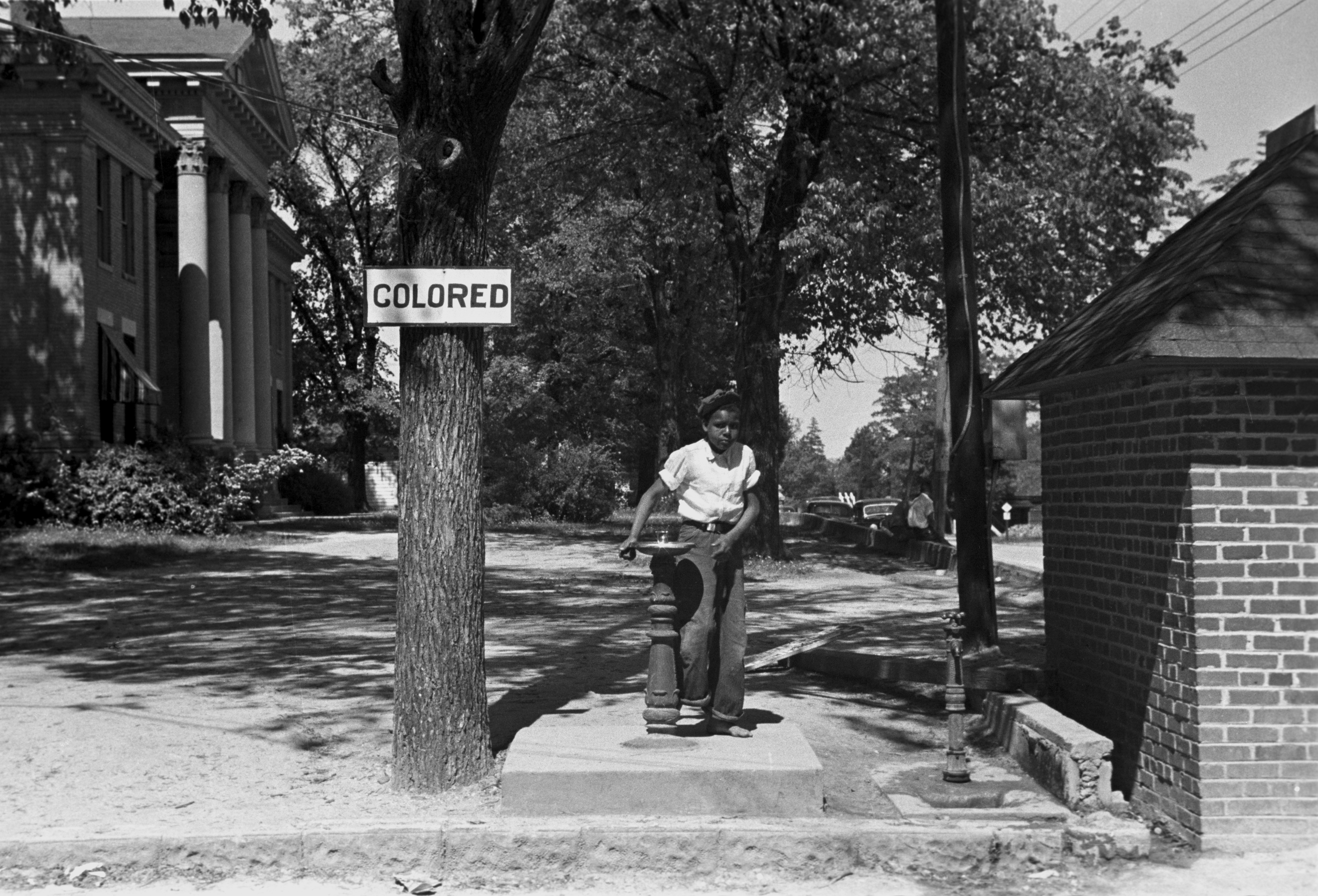
Segregation 1938

thereby liberating himself from his childhood agricultural labor. His experiences in the South laid an important foundation for whom he was to become and how he would interpret the conditions and struggles of distant peoples and cultures that he would eventually encounter. Oakland, a booming blue-collar town, allowed him to experience life outside of the South's strict codes of racial segregation. In the midst of new experiences, such as sitting on the front seats of a bus, Jones encountered diverse individuals with even more diverse sets of ideas. His sister, a secretary for the local communist party, likely facilitated these entrées. This first experience of living in an urban setting, surrounded by those working a mix of blue- and white-collar jobs, likely impacted Jones's notion of the range of possibilities for his own life.

Jones earned his B.A. in anthropology at San Francisco State College in 1959, M.A. degree from the University of Arizona in 1962 and PhD from Cornell University in 1967.

== Early career ==
After graduating from Oakland Technical High School in 1954, the first possibility that Jones chose to pursue was college. He enrolled in what is now San Francisco State University, and although his initial intent was to become a writer, there his intellectual curiosities led him to the field of anthropology. During his time at San Francisco State, Jones was greatly influenced by the founder of the university's Anthropology Department, Adán Treganza. Treganza was an adventurous outdoors man who, in spite of a shoestring budget, took students into the field for archaeological training. Under his tutelage, Jones gained his first hands-on experiences in anthropology. Duly inspired, Jones earned a BA in anthropology from San Francisco State University in 1959 and went on to pursue graduate studies in the discipline. During the time that Jones was working to become an anthropologist, the discipline, like academia and society in general, was undergoing significant changes. Within academia, the era of McCarthyism was coming to an end, precipitating an era of antiestablishment.

Jones left college instilled with ideas concerning social inequality and a desire to work for social justice from within the disciplinary perspective of anthropology. When the US Army sought to draft Jones, they learned of some of his earlier political activities, and the military rejected him for service, designating him a security risk. He had been only marginally involved in these groups, which included the Junior Youth League, the San Francisco Writers Workshop, and the Youth Recorder, and had not participated in any subversive activities. However, the hysteria surrounding McCarthyism meant that the armed forces would not tolerate anyone in its ranks having even the slightest connections to left-leaning ideas or individuals.

== Later career ==
Jones's second option was to move his family and enroll in the University of Arizona, where he had been accepted into the master's program in anthropology. There, his anthropological curiosities were nurtured under the tutelage and mentorship of Robert Allan Hackenberg. Jones arrived in Arizona to find Hackenberg engaged in work under the auspices of the University of Arizona's Bureau of Ethic Research, focusing on a Southwest Native American tribe, then known as the Papago. Through his work with Hackenberg, Jones acquired substantial skills and experience in the large-scale collection of ethnographic data. He compiled thorough descriptions of existing Papago settlements. While still a masters' student, he published an article titled "A Description of Settlement Pattern and Population Movement on the Papago Reservation". In this article, he focused on the link between economic changes and residential patterns as the Papago became less involved in "subsistence activities" and increasingly reliant on a cha-based economy. Jones completed his masters in an anthropology in 1962 with the penning of his thesis, left Arizona and moved to Ithaca, NY, to begin his doctoral work.

At Cornell University, Jones minored in Asian Studies and archeology. Taking advantage of the program's strong Asian Studies focus, Jones chose Southeast Asia as his site for dissertation research. Initially, Jones prepared to do research among ethnic minorities in Burma. However, a fragile political stability in the country degenerated into violent conflict, barring it as a possible research site. Given his investment in language training, Jones chose to do research among a linguistically similar ethnic minority, the Lahu, in neighboring Thailand. In choosing Cornell at this time, Jones unwittingly positioned himself in an academic community influenced by CIA-Sponsored intelligence-gathering activities. In 1964, Jones was a PhD student focused on doing good research and completing his dissertation. For fourteen months he explored cultural variation with the Lahu. Jones traveled to Thailand with his wife and children. The Jones family came to see that there was a significant American presence in Thailand associated with unspoken activities, and it soon became apparent to Jones that covert operations were taking place in the region. Jones completed his research and went on to finish his dissertation, earning his doctoral degree in 1967.

== Books & Publications ==
- 1970 "Towards a Native Anthropology."
- Applied Anthropology and the Application of Anthropological Knowledge 1976-10-01, Vol.35 (3), p. 221-229.
- "The community and organizations in the community."
- In Leith Mullings, ed., Urban Anthropology in the United States (1987).
- "The culture of achievement among the poor: the case of mothers and children in a Head Start Program."
- Critique of Anthropology13(3):247-266; "Epilogue."
- In Faye V Harrison, ed., Decolonizing Anthropology. Second edition (1997).
