= James Spradley =

American social scientist and university professor (1933–1982)

James P. Spradley
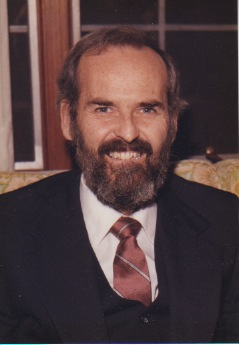
- James P. Spradley
- Born: 1933
- Died: 1982 (aged 48–49)
- Occupations: professor, ethnographer, anthropologist
- Writing career
- Notable works: Deaf Like Me, The Ethnographic Interview, Participant Observation

James P. Spradley (1933–1982) was a social scientist and a professor of anthropology at Macalester College. Spradley wrote or edited 20 books on ethnography and qualitative research including The Cultural Experience: Ethnography in Complex Society (1972), Deaf Like Me (1979), The Ethnographic Interview (1979), and Participant Observation (1980).

== Life and career ==
Spradley earned his PhD in anthropology from the University of Washington in 1967. His dissertation, which was supervised by Melville Jacobs, was entitled James Sewed: A Social, Cultural and Psychological Analysis of a Bicultural Innovator.

Spradley joined the faculty at Macalester College in 1969 on the behest of the college's anthropology professor, Dave McCurdy, with whom he would later collaborate on a number of academic book projects. Spradley died of leukemia in 1982.

== Work ==
Spradley was a major figure in the development of the "new ethnography" which saw every individual as a carrier of the culture rather than simply looking to the outputs of the great artists of the time. Spradley argued that ethnography differed from other deductive types of social research in that the five steps of ethnographic research—selecting a problem, collecting data, analyzing data, formulating hypotheses, and writing—all happen simultaneously.

Much of Spradley's work was guided by his interest in "ethnographic semantics", which sought to apply "explicitly 'scientific' analytical frameworks to the analysis of cultural phenomena". In The Ethnographic Interview, Spradley describes four types of ethnographic analysis that basically build on each other. The first type of analysis is domain analysis, which is "a search for the larger units of cultural knowledge". The other kinds of analysis are taxonomy analysis, componential analysis, and theme analysis.

== Reception ==
Spradley's work was widely used as college texts for American Studies classes in the 1970s.

Spradley's book You Owe Yourself a Drunk (1970), in which he conducted interviews and created a "typology of the different kinds" of homeless alcoholic men, has been called an exemplar of "good systemic ethnography".

== Select works ==
- 1970. You Owe Yourself a Drunk: An Ethnography of Urban Nomads. Boston: Little, Brown and Company (Reissued: Long Grove, IL: Waveland Press, 2000).
- 1971. Conformity and Conflict: Readings in Cultural Anthropology (edited with David W. McCurdy). Boston: Little, Brown and Company. (15th Edition, with additions by Dianna Shandy, Boston: Pearson Education; 16th Edition, with additions by Dianna Shandy, Long Grove, IL: Waveland Press).
- 1972. The Cultural Experience: Ethnography in Complex Society (with David W. McCurdy). Chicago: Science Research Associates (Second Edition, with additions by Dianna J. Shandy, Long Grove, IL: Waveland Press, 2005).
- 1972. Culture and Cognition: Rules, Maps and Plans. San Francisco: Chandler.
- 1975. The Cocktail Waitress: Woman's Work in a Man's World (with Brenda J. Mann). New York: Wiley (Reissued: Long Grove, IL: Waveland Press, 2008).
- 1976. Ethics and Anthropology: Dilemmas in Fieldwork (with Michael A. Rynkiewich). New York: Wiley.
- 1978. Deaf Like Me (with Thomas Spradley). New York: Random House (Reissued: Washington, DC: Gallaudet University Press, 1987).
- 1979. The Ethnographic Interview. Belmont, CA: Wadsworth (Reissued Long Grove, IL: Waveland Press, 2016).
- 1980. Participant Observation. New York: Holt, Rinehart and Winston (Reissued Long Grove, IL: Waveland Press, 2016).
- 1980. Anthropology: The Cultural Perspective (with David W. McCurdy). New York: Wiley (Reissued Long Grove, IL: Waveland Press 1989).
