= Nelisiwe Xaba =

South African performance artist

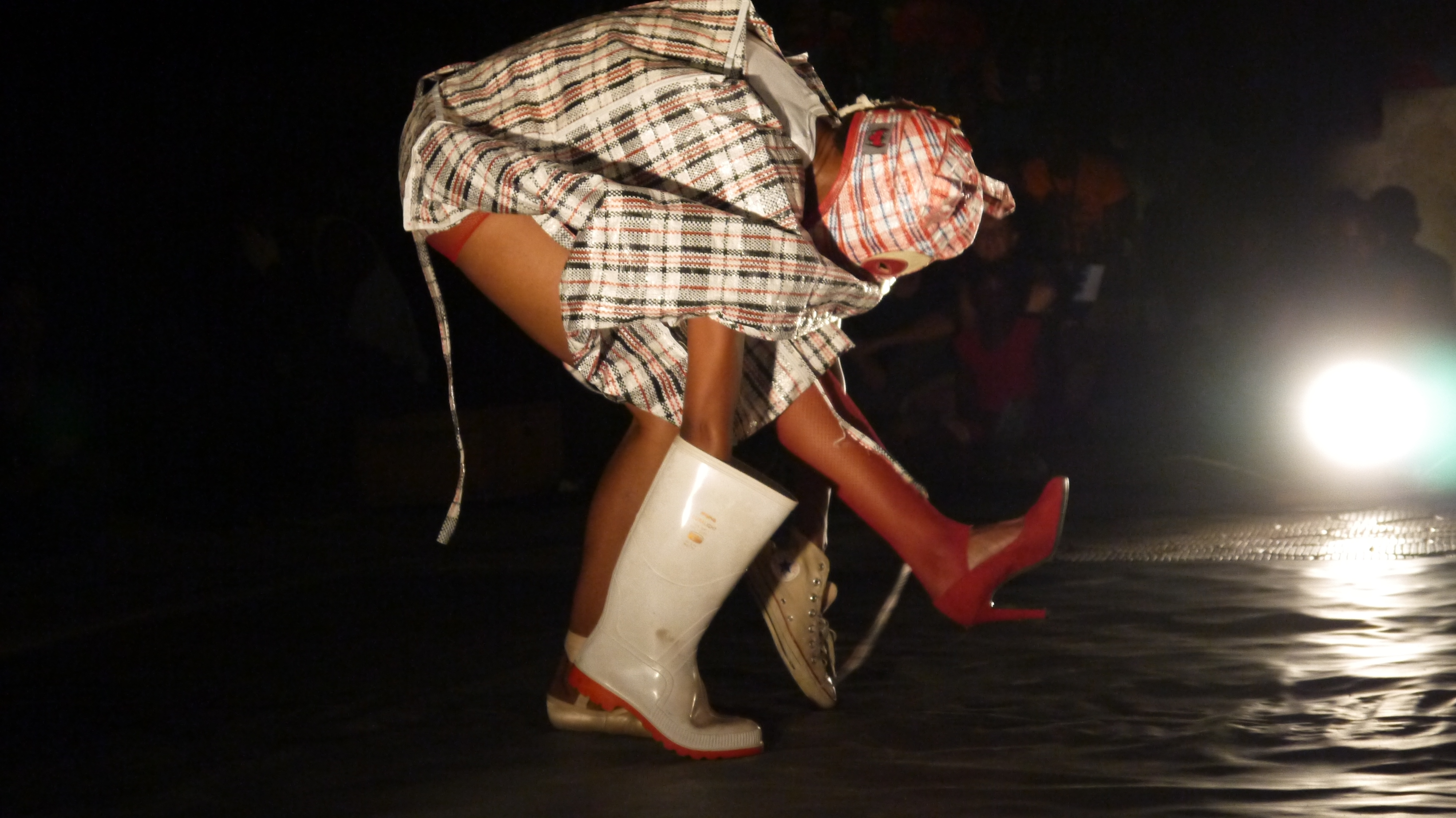
- Education: Johannesburg Dance Foundation, Rambert School of Ballet and Contemporary Dance
- Occupations: Performance artist and choreographer

Nelisiwe Xaba, born in Soweto, South Africa, is a South African performance artist and choreographer.

== Biography ==
Born and raised in the Dube neighborhood of Soweto (Johannesburg, South Africa), Nelisiwe Xaba is a performance artist and choreographer who began her career as a dancer in the early 1990s when she received a scholarship to study dance at the Johannesburg Dance Foundation. In 1996, Xaba won another scholarship to the Rambert School of Ballet and Contemporary Dance in London, where she studied ballet and contemporary dance techniques, under the artistic direction of Ross McKim. On her return to South Africa in 1997, Xaba joined the Pact Dance Company before embarking on a freelance career, which allowed her to work with many recognized choreographers, including Robyn Orlin.

== Career ==
Since launching her solo career, Xaba has worked on a number of multimedia projects and has collaborated with visual artists, stylists, theater and television directors, poets and musicians. Xaba's seminal works, Plasticization and They Look at Me & That's All They Think, have been presented internationally for several years. For They Look at Me & That's All They Think, inspired by the story of Saartjie Baartman (often pejoratively called the Hottentot Venus), Xaba worked with stylist Carlo Gibson. In 2008, she collaborated with the Haitian dancer and choreographer Kettly Noël to create Correspondances, a satirical work on relations between women, which was presented in North and South America, Europe and Africa. In 2009, her play Black! . . . White?, a production of the Center de Développement Chorégraphique (Toulouse, France), toured throughout France. The same year, she created The Venus, combining two of her previous solo pieces, They Look at Me... and Sakhozi Says Non to the Venus, originally commissioned by the Musée du Quai Branly (Paris, France).

Xaba's work is largely influenced by her feminist and anti-racist positions, which challenge stereotypes about the black female body and common notions related to gender. In 2011, Xaba was one of the artists featured by the Goodman Gallery South Africa, which showcases leading contemporary artists from the African continent. In 2013, Xaba was selected to present The Venus in Venice as part of "Imaginary Fact, Contemporary South African Art and the Archive" at the South African Pavilion at the 55 Venice Biennale.

Xaba's art reacts to its social context, and in particular to the condition of women. She often integrates objects to break down the barrier between costume and set and calls upon her audience to reconsider performative and receptive norms. In her piece, Uncles and Angels, she collaborated with director Mocke J. van Veuren to create an interactive performance mixing dance and video that questions the notions of chastity, purity, virginity testing and tradition. Uncles and Angels interrogates these concepts by taking an ironic look at the power relations rooted in bodily interaction through performance and projection. Since premiering at the FNB Dance Umbrella festival in South Africa, Uncles and Angels has been presented in Germany, France (in 2013 in Avignon) and Austria. A 3D film based on the work won the FNB Art Fair prize in 2013. The origin of this work is the reed dance, a traditional custom of celebrating the virginity of girls before marriage, bringing together thousands of young Zulu girls. Although the custom disappeared for a time, it has experienced a resurgence since the early 1980s to the point of becoming a tourist attraction. Some young women are assaulted or raped during the ceremony. In another piece, Scars & Cigarettes, Xaba continues to explore the socialization of men and women through specific gender roles in society, focusing on different rites of passage or rituals unique to men, such as circumcision. Yet another work, Fremde Tänze (Strange Dance), created in 2014 as part of a residency in Freiburg im Breisgau, Germany, takes as its starting point work by German choreographers on the concept of exoticism.

A recent issue of The Drama Review devoted several academic articles to Xaba and shifting global audience perspectives on her work.

== Bibliography ==
- Iolanda Pensa (ed. ), Public Art in Africa. Art and urban transformations in Douala, Geneva, Metis Presses, 2017 ISBN 978-2-94-0563-16-6 .
