= Evita Robinson =

- Born: Evita Turquoise Robinson; 1984 (age 41–42); Albany, New York
- Education: Iona College; New York Film Academy
- Occupations: Founder of Nomadness Travel Tribe; 2 x Emmy Award Winning Storyteller + Host; Writer, Screenwriter; Community Advocate; Speaker
- Organization(s): Nomadness Travel Tribe; Evierobbie Media
- Known for: BIPOC travel movement
- Television: Nomadness (talent + writer); Insecure (cameo)
- Website: https://www.evitarobinson.com/ https://nomadnesstraveltribe.com

Evita “Evie” Turquoise Robinson (born 1984) is a writer, two time Emmy award winning storyteller with destinations and brands, keynote speaker, and is the founder of Nomadness Travel Tribe. She was born in Albany and raised in Poughkeepsie, New York. She has also lived in Paris, Japan, and Thailand. She is primarily known as a pioneer of the BIPOC (Black, Indigenous, People of Color) urban travel movement.

After graduating from Iona College, where she studied film and television, Robinson attended the New York Film Academy in Paris for a digital filmmaking program.

Garnering accolades for her work done on diversity and representation within the tourism industry, since creating Nomadness Travel Tribe in September 2011, Evita’s accolades include National Geographic’s ‘21 Most Visionary Women Throughout Travel History’, AFAR Travel Vanguard Award recipient, The Root 100, and being noted as one of Entrepreneur Magazine’s 50 Most Daring Entrepreneurs of 2018. Evita was also invited to the White House under the Obama Administration for their meeting of world's creative change makers, for SXSL (South By South Lawn). In 2017, she was inducted into the third cohort of the TED Residency, and gave her noted TED Talk, "Reclaiming the Globe' that June. Given her work within Black travel data research with the team at CODE Institute, she is also a published scholar in the academic journal Tourism Geographies.

Robinson serves as a host of various travel series for diversified destination marketing and tourism campaigns. Her focus is now non-fiction, as well as writing and producing for the screen, taking nearly two decades of international travel, community building, and cultural immersion to document the stories of those most forgotten.

== Nomadness Travel Tribe ==
Prior to the founding of Nomadness Travel Tribe in September 2011, Robinson featured her solo travel experiences on a blog Nomadness TV.

The Nomadness virtual community, which caters primarily to African-Americans due to a lack of representation in the target market for tourism and hospitality companies, is an invitation-only group of travelers which aims to build an inclusive travel community and making world travel more accessible to people of color. Influenced by Seth Godin’s book, Tribes: We Need You to Lead Us, Robinson chose to refer to her travel group as a “tribe” to convey the innate quality for humans to seek out community.

In 2015, The New York Times reported that the collective consisted of approximately 10,000 travelers spanning 36 countries. At that time, about half of the group’s members were millennials, and the majority were African-American women. In early 2017, the group’s membership was reported to be 80 percent female.

In 2018, NOMADNESS Travel Tribe hosted their first annual festival for BIPOC (Black, Indigenous, People of Color) travelers. NOMADNESS Fest is an immersive experience that celebrates and creates safe spaces for leisure travelers, travel influencers, tour operators, and tourism professionals of color.

In 2025, the group surpassed over 38,000 members, executed five festivals, partnered with dozens of tourism boards and brands on an international scale, and positioned themselves as a hub for tourism marketing that spotlights the stories of marginalized communities.
