= Elizabeth Cullen Dunn =

American political anthropologist and geographer

- Born: 1968 (age 57–58)

Academic background
- Education: Johns Hopkins University
- Thesis: (1998)

Academic work
- Discipline: Anthropology
- Notable works: Privatizing Poland
- Website: Elizabeth Cullen Dunn publications on Academia.edu

Elizabeth Cullen Dunn (born 1968) is an American political anthropologist and geographer. Her work focuses on responses to catastrophic social change, particularly in the post-Soviet world.

== Education ==
Dunn holds a Ph.D. in anthropology from Johns Hopkins University (1998).

== Scholarship ==
Dunn's work investigates governance, the state, and the ways in which these processes strive to produce governable subjects. She investigates these topics by examining the ways they are manifest in people's lived experiences. Though all Dunn's work deals with these topics, thematically, it can be divided into three bodies of literature: on foreign direct investment (FDI) in Poland and the former Eastern Bloc more broadly; on global food safety regulation; and, most recently, on forced migration.

== Career ==
In 2000, Dunn accepted a joint appointment in the Department of Geography and the Program in International Affairs at the University of Colorado in Boulder, CO. In 2014, Dunn moved to the Departments of Geography and International Studies at Indiana University, Bloomington, later becoming Professor.

Fellowships:

- Fellowship at the Wissenschaftskolleg zu Berlin from 1999 to 2000
- Fellow at Yale University’s Center for Agrarian Studies, 2006
- Copenhagen University’s Department of Comparative Cultural and Regional Studies, 2015.

== Selected publications ==
- No Path Home: Humanitarian Camps and the Grief of Displacement. Cornell University Press. 2018. ISBN 9781501712302.
- Privatizing Poland: Baby Food, Big Business, and the Remaking of Labor. Cornell University Press. 2004. ISBN 9780801489297. transl. as;
  - Prywatyzując Polskę (in Polish). Warsaw: Krytyka Polityczna. 2008. ISBN 9788361006114.
