= Michael Atwood Mason =

American folklorist and museum professional

Michael Atwood Mason (born 1966) is an American folklorist and museum professional. He was CEO and Executive Director of President Lincoln's Cottage. Up to February 2021 he was the Director of the Smithsonian Center for Folklife and Cultural Heritage.

== Early life and education ==
Mason is the youngest of three children born to John Skain Mason and Ardath Mason Cade. Born in McCook, Nebraska, he was raised in the Washington, DC, metropolitan area. He is divorced and has two children, Nicolas Stauffer Mason and Rhys Wingreen.

After studying classics at St. John's College (Annapolis/Santa Fe), New Mexico, for two years, Mason transferred to the University of Oregon, where he earned his BA in American studies and was elected the Phi Beta Kappa National Honor Society. He earned his MA and his PhD at the Folklore Institute at Indiana University Bloomington.

== Smithsonian career ==
Mason began his career at the Anacostia Community Museum, where he worked as a researcher and exhibit developer for the Black Mosaic exhibition. In 1994, he moved to the National Museum of Natural History to work as an exhibit developer and co-curator on the African Voices exhibit. Since that time, he has developed or curated more than 60 exhibitions, including Ritmos de Identidad/Rhythms of Identity at the Arts and Industries Building with the Smithsonian Latino Center, and Discovering Rastafari. In 2009, he became the Director of Exhibitions, where he was instrumental in the development and opening of the David H. Koch Hall of Human Origins in 2010.

As one of the leaders of the Recovering Voices initiative at the Smithsonian, he has led the planning for the proposed Recovering Voices exhibition at NMNH, designed to put a human face on the global crisis of language and knowledge loss. In 2012, he led a collaboration between the Smithsonian and the NGO Cultural Survival to host the international conference, "Our Voices on the Air: Reaching New Audiences through Indigenous Radio", convening 28 radio producers from eight countries to explore the nexus of community radio and language revitalization.

As director of the Center for Folklife and Cultural Heritage, Mason oversaw the Smithsonian Folklife Festival on the National Mall, Smithsonian Folkways Recordings, and other cultural educational programs. From his arrival in 2013, to his departure in 2021, he led the development of the Center's new Cultural Sustainability initiatives, which collaborate with communities to help them research, sustain, and present their most cherished cultural expressions. The Center's productions have won Grammy, Academy, Emmy and Webby awards.

== President Lincoln's Cottage ==
In September 2021, Mason was appointed CEO & Executive Director of President Lincoln's Cottage, a National Monument and museum in Washington, DC dedicated to the brave ideas of Abraham Lincoln. As of August 2023, he was no longer employed at the Cottage.]

== Other activities ==
Mason was an exhibit developer for the inaugural exhibition at the Reginald F. Lewis Museum of Maryland African American History & Culture in Baltimore, Maryland. He is a member of the founding faculty of the Cultural Sustainability Masters Program at Goucher College in Towson, Maryland, where he teaches students to develop community-based exhibitions that serve local needs.

== Research ==
Since 1992, Mason has published many articles on the religion and culture of the African Diaspora. His research focuses on the processes through which people deploy elements of the cultural heritage to construct their personal histories and identities, and he has focused extensively on the social construction of human subjectivity and experience. His book, Living Santería: Rituals and Experiences in an Afro-Cuban Religion, was published by the Smithsonian Institution Press in 2002, and was nominated for the Award for Ethnographic Writing. Mason is also the author of the cultural blog dedicated to Babalu Aye, Baba Who? Babalú!.
