= Louis Molet =

French anthropologist

Louis Molet (18 December 1915 – 12 July 1992) was a French anthropologist and missionary. He is known for his research primarily in Madagascar and with the Malagasy peoples.

== Early life ==
Louis Molet was born on 18 December 1915, in Paris. He studied Protestant theology, graduating in 1941, and then went to Madagascar as a missionary until 1949. While in Madagascar, he studied Malagasy and earned a certificate in the language in 1945. Molet also studied law and foreign customs.

== Career ==
In 1950, Molet started as a researcher in Antananarivo at the Institute for Scientific Research of Madagascar. He then became the head of the humanities department at the institute from 1954 to 1958. Molet's publications on Madagascar reference a variety of Madagascan ethnic groups, including the Tsimihety, Antankarana, Betsimisaraka, Makoa, and Mahafaly peoples. He conducted research in the Central African Republic and French Polynesia, then taught at the University of Montreal as an associate professor of anthropology and head of African studies.

Molet spent two years as rector of the University of Kisangani in the Democratic Republic of the Congo. He then returned to Paris in 1970 and served as the research director of Office de la Recherche Scientifique et Technique Outre-mer. In 1976, Molet was elected a corresponding member of the fifth section of the Académie des sciences d'outre-mer.

He died on 12 July 1992 in Saint-Léger-sur-Dheune.

== Bibliography ==
- Molet, Louis (1953). Habitations Betsimisaraka de Lakato (district de Moramanga). Le naturalist malgache 5: 229-244.
- Molet, Louis (1955). Le bain royal à Madagascar : explication de la fête malgache du Fandroana par la coutume disparue de la manducation des morts. Université de Paris, Faculté de Lettres.
- Molet, Louis (1959). L'expansion tsismihety. Modalités et motivations des migrations d'un groupe ethnique du nord de Madagascar. Mémoires de l'Institut Scientifique de Madagascar.
- Molet, Louis (1979). La Conception malgache du monde, du surnaturel et de l'homme en Imerina. Paris: Editions l'Harmattan. ISBN 2858020892.
