= Caroline Bond Day =

American physical anthropologist, author and educator

- Caroline Bond Day
- Born: November 18, 1889; Montgomery, Alabama
- Died: May 5, 1948 (aged 58); North Carolina
- Occupations: Anthropologist, educator, writer

Academic background
- Education: Atlanta University; Radcliffe College; Harvard University

Academic work
- Discipline: physical anthropology
- Notable works: A Study of Some Negro-White Families in the United States

Caroline Stewart Bond Day (November 18, 1889 – May 5, 1948) was an American physical anthropologist, author, and educator. She was one of the first African-Americans to receive a degree in anthropology.

Day is recognized as a pioneer physical anthropologist whose study helped future black researchers and is used to challenge scientific racism about miscegenation.

She published various essays in the 1920s and early 1930s, as well as a short story The Pink Hat, which is believed to be autobiographical. In 1927, she returned to Radcliffe, where she obtained a master's degree in anthropology in 1930. Her thesis, "A Study of Some Negro-White Families in the United States," published in 1932, contained sociological and anthropological information on 350 mixed-race family histories with over 400 photographs. She subsequently spent a number of years teaching at Howard University. Day retired to Durham, North Carolina in 1939. She died on May 5, 1948, having been in poor health.

Day was the first African-American who turned her lens on her own family and social world, "Negro-White" families, in order to scientifically measure and record the hybridity of mixed race families by using the language of what she referred to as "blood-quantum" that illustrates the fraction of racial types. Her research challenged the perception of inferiority of non-whites. She attempted to eliminate racial preconception and discrimination and advocated social equality for all African-Americans. Although Day's work was not well received within contemporary scholarship in the early twentieth century and still remains controversial, her scientific research re-evaluates the accomplishments of African-American women in the white-male-dominated field of physical anthropology and marks the first step in understanding and promoting African-American biological vindication.

== Early life ==
Caroline Bond Day was born on November 18, 1889, to Georgia and Moses Stewart in Montgomery, Alabama. According to her own calculations of blood quantum, Day was a mulatto; 7/16 Negro; 1/16 Indian; and 8/16 White. After her father's death, her mother moved to Tuskegee, Alabama, where she taught at Tuskegee Elementary School, and married John Percy Bond, a life insurance company executive. Day took her stepfather's last name and had a half-sister, Wenonah Bond Logan, and a half-brother, Jack Bond.

== Education ==
After Day attended Tuskegee Elementary School (1905) and Atlanta University's College Preparatory Division (1908), she received a bachelor's degree at Atlanta University in 1912, but her major and courses are unknown. She studied under noted actress Adrienne McNeil Herndon at Atlanta. Day entered Radcliffe College in 1916. She took undergraduate courses with Earnest Hooton, the only physical anthropologist within the academic department at Harvard and became the editor of her research project. Day obtained her bachelor's degree from Radcliffe in 1919 and earned a master's degree from Harvard in 1932.

== Research ==
By continuing to collect data from people of mixed black and white ancestry "in her spare time" over the thirteen years, Day successfully published "A Study of Some Negro-White Families in the United States" in 1932. Her accomplishment brought her the title of the first African-American anthropologist at Harvard to receive a master's degree with first authorship for her research work. Her research was a unique anthropological study that provided over 400 family photographs and morphological features and possible inheritance patterns and gave a scholarly examination of physiological, biological, and sociological characteristics of race-crossing. Her research included information on respected families including those of sculptor May Howard Jackson and other respected intellectuals in the African American community.

It is possible that Day was influenced by W. E. B. Du Bois' sociological study of the African-American as a social group. Du Bois, the editor of The Crisis, was a professor of economics and history at Atlanta University from 1896 to 1910 while Day was attending the university. Du Bois supported Day's research and corresponded with her regarding her thesis work at Radcliffe. In fact, Day utilized his family photos in her research paper.

== Career ==
Caroline Bond Day occupied a variety of jobs following her graduation from Radcliffe. In 1919 in New York City, she worked with black soldiers and their families in support and relief services. Day also found work as a student secretary of the National Board of the YMCA in Montclair, New Jersey. After her marriage to Aaron Day in 1920, she and her husband moved to Waco, Texas, where she was Dean of Women at Paul Quinn College for a year, and spent another year as head of the English Department at Prairie View State College.

In 1922, the Days moved to Atlanta, Georgia, where she then taught English and drama at the same university she first attended, Atlanta University. She taught there until 1929 while also publishing some essays and short stories, such as her famous tale, The Pink Hat. Between the years 1927 and 1930, Day was on leave to take some courses in anthropology at Radcliffe, and also to continue the research that she began with Earnest Hooton in her senior year at Radcliffe in 1919.

While working on her research in Hooton's lab, Day was able to collect and analyze sociological and physiological information on 346 families, including her own. These results were published in 1932 by Harvard's Peabody Museum, named "A Study of Some Negro-White Families in the United States". After a while, Day took a break from the project due to being exhausted and a rheumatic heart condition.

She returned to teaching in Atlanta University and taught English and was also "said to have given the first class in anthropology ever offered in Atlanta University". Day and her husband then moved to Washington D.C. in 1930 where she then taught English at Howard University for two years, following her job in social work as settlement-house supervisor in Washington D.C., and then as general Secretary of the Phillis Wheatley YMCA. Finally in late 1939, the Days moved to Durham, North Carolina, where Day taught English and drama at North Carolina College for Negroes (now called North Carolina Central University), but then retired that same year due to her heart illness.

== Death and archive ==
Day was suffering from recurrent illness, and she died from a stroke due to complications from her chronic heart condition on May 5, 1948, in North Carolina. Day's archive is kept at the Peabody Museum of Harvard University. A digital edition of her thesis is available through Harvard University Library.

== See also ==
- William Montague Cobb
- Earnest Hooton
- Rachel J. Watkins
