= Herb Di Gioia =

Umberto Di Gioia

Herb Di Gioia was an Italian, American documentary film director who pioneered the field of "observational cinema" in his work and impacted ethnographic film making through his contributions as a teacher at Britain's National Film and Television School. Di Gioia's films are recognized as a significant departure from the better-known works of other observational documentarians, like David and Judith MacDougall.

== Work ==
The UCLA-educated Di Gioia was not an anthropologist by profession, but was drawn to the field by an interest in exploring the lives of ordinary people. In the early 1970s, Di Gioia and his partner David Hancock became involved in the work of filmmaker Norman Miller, upon whom the National Science Foundation had bestowed a grant to produce a film series examining global ecological zones. Di Gioia and Hancock produced several films in Afghanistan which were incorporated into the Faces of Change Collection.

After the death of his partner, Di Gioia focused predominantly on teaching, training anthropologyand filmmaking students at the University of Illinois Chicago's Visual Anthropology MA program in the Anthropology Department in the mid to late 1970's, then at the National Film and Television School in ethnographic filmmaking.

== See also ==
- John Marshall
- Robert Gardner
- Tim Asch

== Filmography ==
- Afghan Nomads (1974)
- Afghan Village (1974)
- Naim and Jabar (1974)
- Wheat Cycle (1975)
- Peter and Jane Flint (1975)
- Peter Murray (1975)
- Duwayne Masure (1971)
- Chester Grimes (1972)

== Related links ==
- Faces of Change: Afghan Series
- BFI Film & TV database: Di Gioia, Herbert
