= Gerald F. Schroedl =

American anthropologist

Gerald F. Schroedl is a professor of anthropology at the University of Tennessee. He specializes in Southeastern United States and Caribbean prehistoric and historic archaeological sites. He is an authority on Cherokee prehistory and the archaeology of eastern Tennessee and western North Carolina.

Schroedl was born in Portland, Oregon, on July 20, 1945. He grew up in Vancouver, Washington, where he attended primary and secondary school. He started off his college career in Vancouver, Clark Junior College before transferring to the University of Washington, where he received his bachelor's degree in 1967. He then went to Washington State University in Pullman to complete his Ph.D. in anthropology in 1972.

As a youth, he was fascinated by natural history and science, and was always interested in American Indian cultures. In high school, he began reading anthropology and popular books on archaeology, and was initially interested in cultural anthropology. After attending an archaeological field school his senior year in college he decided to focus on archaeology in graduate school.

Schroedl has conducted excavations in Washington, South Carolina, Tennessee, and St. Kitts. His research interests include North American archaeology, Southeastern United States prehistory, ethnohistory and ethnography, archaeological method and theory, archaeological resource management, remote sensing, and archaeology of enslaved Africans in the Caribbean. He has written 10 books and monographs, 23 articles in books, and 39 technical journal articles.

He came to the University of Tennessee in 1971 to work on the Tellico Archaeological Project and other cultural resource management projects. In 1978, he joined the department in a tenure track position and has been there since.

== Key excavations ==
Since the 1960s, Schroedl has been involved in over 60 different archaeological projects. His work in Tennessee has emphasized late prehistoric sites and the villages of the 18th century Cherokee. In the 1980s and 1990s his interests in Cherokee culture continued with excavations at Chattooga. He received the United States Forest Service National Award for Excellence for contributions on this project.

In 1996, his research took a new direction when he began research at the Brimstone Hill Fortress, a UNESCO World Heritage site, on St. Kitts in the Eastern Caribbean. This project emphasizes studies of enslaved Africans and British colonial culture.

== Selected books and monographs ==
- Schroedl, G.F. 1973 Archaeological Occurrence of Bison in the Southern Plateau. Washington State University, Laboratory of Anthropology, Report of Investigations, No. 51. Pullman. iv + 77 pp., illus.
- Schroedl, G.F. 1975 Archaeological Investigations at the Harrison Branch and Bat Creek Sites in the Tellico Reservoir. University of Tennessee, Department of Anthropology, Report of Investigations, No. 10. Knoxville. xv + 284 pp., tables, illus.
- Schroedl, G.F. 1977 Excavations of the Leuty and McDonald Site Mounds in the Watts Bar Nuclear Plant Area. University of Tennessee, Department of Anthropology, Report of Investigations, No. 22. Knoxville. xi + 231 pp., Illus., tables.
- Schroedl, G.F. 1978 Patrick Site (40MR40), Tellico Reservoir, Tennessee. University of Tennessee, Department of Anthropology, Report of Investigations, No. 25. Knoxville. xi + 241 pp., illus., tables.
- Schroedl, G.F., R.P.S. Davis Jr., and C.C. Boyd Jr. 1985 Archaeological Contexts and Assemblages at Martin Farm. University of Tennessee, Department of Anthropology, Report of Investigations, No. 39, xxv + 510 pp., illus., tables, appendices.
- Schroedl, G.F. (Editor) 1986 Overhill Cherokee Archaeology at Chota-Tanasee. University of Tennessee, Department of Anthropology, Report of Investigations 38. Knoxville. xxii + 551 pp., illus., tables, appendices.
- Schroedl, Gerald F. 1990 Archaeological Research at 40RE107, 40RE108, and 40RE124 in the Clinch River Breeder Reactor Plant Area, Tennessee. University of Tennessee, Department of Anthropology, Report of Investigations 49. xi + 192 pp., illus., tables, appendices.

== Articles in books and journals ==
- Schroedl, G.F. 1978. Louis-Phillipe's Journal and Archaeological Investigations at the Overhill Cherokee Town of Toqua. Journal of Cherokee Studies, 3(4):206-220.
- Schroedl, G.F.1986. Toward an Explanation of Cherokee Origins in East Tennessee. In Proceedings of the Conference on Cherokee Prehistory, assembled by David G. Moore, pp. 122–138. Warren Wilson College, Swannanoa, NC.
- Boyd, Clifford C. Jr. and G.F. Schroedl. 1987. In Search of Coosa. American Antiquity 52:840-844.
- Schroedl, Gerald F. and C. Clifford Boyd Jr. 1988. Mississippian Origins in East Tennessee. In The Emergent Mississippian: Proceedings of the Sixth Mid-South Archaeological Conference, edited by Richard A. Marshall, pp. 137–148. Cobb Institute of Archaeology, Mississippi State University, Occasional Paper 87–01.
- Schroedl, Gerald F. 1989. Overhill Cherokee Household and Village Patterns in the Eighteenth Century. In Households and Communities: Proceedings of the 21st Annual Chacmool Conference, edited by Scott MacEachern, David Archer, and Richard Garvin, pp. 350–360. Calgary, Alberta, Canada.
- Schroedl, G.F., C.C. Boyd Jr. and R.P.S. Davis Jr. 1990 Explaining Mississippian Origins in East Tennessee. In The Mississippian Emergence, edited by Bruce D. Smith., pp. 175–196. Smithsonian Institution Press.
- Schroedl, Gerald F. and C. Clifford Boyd Jr. 1991 Late Woodland Period Culture in East Tennessee. In Stability, Transformation, and Variation: The Late Woodland Southeast, edited by Michael S. Nassaney and Charles R. Cobb, pp. 69–90. Plenum Press, New York.
- Schroedl, Gerald F. 1994. A Comparison of the Origins of Macon Plateau and Hiwassee Island Cultures. In Ocmulgee Archaeology, 1936–1986, edited by David H. Hally, pp. 138–143. University of Georgia Press.
- Schroedl, Gerald F. 1998. Chota-Tanasee (pp. 150–152); Dallas Culture (pp. 193–194); Hiwassee Island (p. 361); Toqua (pp. 842–843). In Archaeology of Prehistoric North America: An Encyclopedia, edited by Guy Gibbon. Garland Press, New York.
- Schroedl, Gerald F. 1998. Mississippian Towns in the Eastern Tennessee Valley. In Mississippian Towns and Sacred Spaces, edited by Barry Lewis and Charles Stout, pp. 64–92. University of Alabama Press.
- Schroedl, Gerald F. 1998. Attakullakulla (p. 36); Chota (pp. 154–155); Mississippian Culture (pp. 634–635); Oconastota. (p. 707); Overhill Cherokee (pp. 713–714); Henry Timberlake (pp. 978–979); Toqua (p. 984). In The Tennessee Encyclopedia of History and Culture, edited by Carol Van West. Rutlege Hill Press, Nashville.
- Klippel, Walter E. and Gerald F. Schroedl. 1999. African Slave Craftsmen and Single Hole Bone Discs from Brimstone Hill, St. Kitts, West Indies. Post Medieval Archaeology 33:222-232.
- Schroedl, Gerald F. 2000. Cherokee Ethnohistory and Archaeology from 1540 to 1838 In Indians of the Greater Southeast during the Historic Period, edited by Bonnie McEwan, pp. 204–241. University Press of Florida, Gainesville.
- Schroedl, Gerald F. 2001. Cherokee Archaeology Since the 1970s. In Integrating Appalachian Archaeology, edited by Lynne Sullivan and Susan Prezzano, pp. 278–297 University of Tennessee Press.
- Schroedl, Gerald F. 2002. The Complementary Roles of Research, Cultural Resource Management, and Public Outreach in the Chattooga Archaeological Project. In Culture, Environment, and Conservation in the Appalachian South., edited by Benita J. Howell, pp. 153–169. University of Illinois Press.
- Schroedl, Gerald F. and Todd M. Ahlman. 2002. The Maintenance of Cultural and Personal Identities of Enslaved Africans and British Soldiers at the Brimstone Hill Fortress, St. Kitts, West Indies. Historical Archaeology, 36(4): 38–49.
- Schroedl, Gerald F. 2006. Chota Village, Tn. In Encyclopedia of Appalachia, edited by Ruby Abramson and Jean Haskell, p. 743. University of Tennessee Press, Knoxville.
- Ahlman, Todd M., Gerald F. Schroedl, Ashley H. McKeown, Robert J. Speakman and Michael D. Glascock. 2008 Ceramic Production and Exchange among Enslaved Africans on St. Kitts, West Indies. In An Exporatory Study into the Chemical Characterization of Caribbean Ceramics, edited by Christophe Descantes, Robert J. Speakman, Michael D. Glascock, and Matthew T. Boulanger, pp. 109–122. Special Publication No. 2, Journal of Caribbean Archaeology
- Schroedl, Gerald F. 2009. Chota and Tanasee Village. In Archaeology in America: An Encyclopedia, edited by Francis P. McManamon, Volume 1, pp. 365–367. Greenwood Press, Wesport Connecticut, ISBN 978-0-313-33185-5
