= Roland Littlewood =

British anthropologist (1947–2025)

Roland Martin Littlewood FRAI (2 February 1947 – 22 November 2025) was a British anthropologist and psychiatrist, and Professor of Anthropology and Psychiatry at University College London. He was the co-author (with Maurice Lipsedge) of the book Aliens and Alienists, now in its third edition. During his career, he was President of the Royal Anthropological Institute from 1994 to 1997.

Littlewood had interests in the (medical and social) anthropology of the Caribbean, Albania and Britain. He wrote extensively about the diagnosis of the black immigrant population in the UK.

Littlewood died on 22 November 2025, at the age of 78.

== Published works (selection) ==
- With Edmund Leach, Meyer Fortes: Pathology and identity. The Work of Mother Earth in Trinidad. Cambridge University Press, Cambridge 1993, ISBN 0-521-02615-6 (also reprinted in 2006).
- The Butterfly and the serpent. Essays in psychiatry, race and religion. Free Association Books, London 1998, ISBN 1-85343-399-3.
- Ed.: Cultural psychiatry & medical anthropology. An introduction and reader. Athlone Press, London 2000, ISBN 0-485-11527-1.
- Religion, agency, restitution. The Wilde lectures in natural religion 1999. Oxford University Press, Oxford 2001, ISBN 0-19-924197-X.
- Pathologies of the West. An anthropology of mental illness in Europe and America. Cornell University Press, Ithaca, N.Y. 2002, ISBN 0-8014-3934-5.
- With Maurice Lipsedge: Aliens and alienists. Ethnic minorities and psychiatry. Penguin, Harmondsworth 1982. (3rd Edition. Routledge, Hove 2004, ISBN 0-415-15724-2).
- On knowing and not knowing in the anthropology of medicine. Left Coast Press, Walnut Creek, California 2007, ISBN 978-1-59874-275-6.
