= Barbara Neis =

Canadian social scientist

- Born: 1952 (age 73–74); Ontario, Canada

Academic background
- Education: B.A., 1975, York University; M.A., 1981, Memorial University of Newfoundland; PhD., sociology, 1988, University of Toronto
- Thesis: From cod block to fish food: the crisis and restructuring in the Newfoundland fishing industry, 1968-1986 (1988)

Barbara Neis CM FRSC (born 1952) is a Canadian social scientist. She is a John Lewis Paton Distinguished Research Professor in the Department of Sociology at the Memorial University of Newfoundland and Senior Research Associated in the SafetyNet Centre.

== Career ==
Neis joined the faculty of Humanities and Social Sciences at the Memorial University of Newfoundland in 1984. By 1998, she received the President's Award for Outstanding Research. Neis and Steven Bornstein later became co-directors of SafeytNet Centre for Occupational Health and Safety Research. In 2003, they received a grant from the Canadian Institutes of Health Research to develop an East Coast Consortium on Workplace Health and Safety in collaboration with the Université de Sherbrooke and the Institut de recherche Robert-Sauvé en santé et en sécurité du travail (IRSST). Two years later, Neis was appointed to the Social Sciences and Humanities Research Council. In 2008, Neis was honoured by the University of Tromsø in Norway with an honorary doctorate award.

By 2013, Neis was elected a Fellow of the Royal Society of Canada for her contributions to the fish stock industry. The following year, she collaborated with regional hubs in British Columbia, Ontario, Quebec and Newfoundland to help injured, ill, and impaired workers stay in the job market. In 2017, Neis was appointed the John Lewis Paton Distinguished University Professorship.

In 2018, Neis was the recipient of the 2018 Vanier Institute Award for her research contribution that helped advance families in Canada. She was also selected to sit on the Council of Canadian Academies Scientific Advisory Committee. A few days after being named to the council, Neis was appointed a Member of the Order of Canada.

From 2022 to 2025, Neis was the President of the Academy of Social Sciences within the Royal Society of Canada.
