= Woni Spotts =

American world traveller

Woni Spotts is an American woman who completed visiting every country and continent in the world in 2018. According to media studies scholar Tori Omega Arthur, consensus had developed after 2019 that Spotts was the first Black woman to do so.

== Early life ==
Spotts was born in 1964 in Los Angeles to Betty (née Mosley) and Roger Spotts. Her mother was a singer, dancer, and pianist and her father was a composer and arranger.

== Travel ==
In 1979, when she was 15, Nolan Davis, a friend of her father's, offered her work as the subject of a documentary he was producing that involved significant overseas travel. By 1982, she had visited more than 160 countries. During this time she kept detailed records as part of her work on the documentary. She resumed her travels in 2013 and completed them in 2018. Most of her travel was not documented via social media.

== Recognition ==
Travel blogger Jessica Nabongo disputed that Spotts had visited every country, saying in 2019 that she herself was the first Black woman to do so, a claim that was broadly accepted and publicized. Tori Omega Arthur, writing in the journal Social Media + Society, characterised Nabongo's dispute of Spott's claim as presentism, as it is based on the fact that since Spotts began her travels, multiple countries have changed borders and/or names.

According to Arthur, Spotts' accomplishment was overlooked because much of her travel was done in the 1970s and 80s, almost none of it was publicized in social media, and that only after Nabongo's claim and Spotts' dispute of it was Spotts' earlier accomplishment recognized. Uproxx noted that in mid-2019, after Spotts had completed her visits but before Nabongo had completed hers, Nabongo had "branded herself" around the idea of being the first Black woman to visit all countries. Essence wrote that because Spotts was "of a certain age" and had not made branding deals, she was effectively silenced by the same publications that championed the achievement of the younger, more media-savvy Nabongo. Melan Magazine said Spotts' claim had "caught all of us by surprise, especially as our attention was on another Black woman who was on a very public mission to achieve this same feat."

Arthur wrote that consensus had developed after 2019 that Spotts was the first Black woman to visit every country. In 2023 Spotts was declared the "World's first Black woman to visit every country" by the World Records Union.

== See also ==
- Black Travel Movement
- List of women explorers and travelers
- List of black anthropologists
