= Lee Henderson Watkins =

American apiculturist (1908–1972)

- Born: 1908; Selma, California, U.S.
- Died: April 6, 1972
- Education: Fresno State College, University of California, Berkeley
- Occupations: Anthropologist, writer
- Spouse: Millicent Saylor
- Children: Sanine and Phillip

Lee Henderson Watkins (1908–1972) was born in 1908. He was an amateur apiculturist and anthropologist, member of the AAA, president of the Alameda County Beekeepers' Association (ACBA) from 1949–1951, and eventually emeritus apiarist of the University of California, Davis.

== Biography ==
Growing up in the San Joaquin Valley in California, he attended the common schools of Selma, California, in Fresno County. His father was a beekeeper who taught the craft to his sons, inspiring Watkin's great interest in agriculture and apiculture. Lee was also an avid enthusiast of running (especially sprinting) and enjoyed participating and watching track throughout his life.

Watkins spent a short but meaningful time in the Protestant Church where he over indulged in proselytization before abruptly ending his relationship with organized religion, indicated by his personalized moniker for the organization as 'Two-seed-in-the-spirit-predestinarian-Baptists.'

Watkins studied at both Fresno State College and the University of California, Berkeley, though never received a degree from either but remained a lifelong academic. His anthropological mentors were Alfred L. Kroeber, Robert Lowie, Paul Radin, and Frederick Teggart. He was well respected within his field for his research, writing, and lectures. He informally remained at U.C. Berkeley studying anthropology and apiculture under his mentors. He was employed as an apiary assistant in the Department of Entomology at the University of California, Davis and studied the history of science, the history of technology, and the history of agriculture and ethnohistory. Watkins is known for perpetually refuting that the American Indians had kept bees before Christopher Columbus. After he retired from the Department of Entomology, he traveled the nation gathering notes, publications, and interviews, developing a wide breadth of knowledge on pioneer beekeepers.

== Personal life and death ==
He had two children, Sanine and Phillip with his wife, Millicent Saylor, a librarian and school teacher. He and his wife were active participants in the women's rights movement. He served a term as the Chairman of the Yolo County Grand Jury and was one of the people instrumental in founding the Sacramento-Davis branch of the American Civil Liberties Union (ALCU) and felt a strong sense of duty to the plight of migrant farm workers and prisoner.

Lee H. Watkins died on April 6, 1972.

== Legacy ==
"His work in the field of agricultural, which is neglected by most anthropologists, can be seen in specialized journals and is greatly valued. Watkins retained the anthropological approach in everything he did, having a vast impact on women's rights, civil liberties, and agricultural history."

== Literary contributions ==
Watkins was authored and co-authored many texts:

- Beekeeping in California, published by the University of California Regents.
- Notes on George Leite, Editor of Circle (1945)
- "John S. Harbison: California's First Modern Beekeeper"
- "The John S. Harbison manuscripts in the Sierra Museum." (1968–1969)
- "The Mahan-Parsons Italian bee controversy: part. III. The California story." (1968–1969)
- "Migratory beekeeping in California." (1968–1969)
- "A forgotten national beekeepers' convention." (1968–1969)
- American Bee Journal
- Volume 108: "First Honey Bees in New England – 1638?" P. 19
- "Toynbee’s relationship to the findings of anthropology"
- "The history of knots"
- "The history of beekeeping"

Many of his anthropological texts have been donated to the University of California, Davis; some of which remained incomplete or unfinished like his long-term project, "The biography of the early-day California beekeeper Harbison." Watkins’ bibliography is on file at the University of California, Davis.
