= Brian Douglas Hayden =

Brian Douglas Hayden (born 1946) is an American ethnoarchaeologist prominent in research in North and Central America and Australia.

== Early life and education ==
Hayden was born in Flushing, New York on 14 February 1946, and was son of F. Douglas and Constance Hayden. He married Huguette Sansonnet, on 26 August 1970. They have three children. He studied at the University of Bordeaux, (certificate) 1967, the University of Colorado, completing a B.A. in 1969 and a Masters and PhD at University of Toronto, M.A., in 1970, and 1976 respectively.

== Career ==
Hayden worked briefly as a researcher at the American Stock Exchange, New York, NY, in 1964 and then as an instructor in sociology and anthropology at the Virginia Commonwealth University, Richmond in 1973-74 and Simon Fraser University, Burnaby, British Columbia, in 1974–76. This was followed by positions as assistant professor, associate professor, and professor of archaeology.

He was made emeritus Professor of archaeology at Simon Fraser University in Burnaby, British Columbia, an Honorary Research Associate in the Department of Anthropology at the University of British Columbia, and a fellow of the Royal Society of Canada. He retired in 2012 but continued his research privately.

== Awards ==
- Fulbright Fellowship, 1971–72
- Wenner-Gren Foundation for Anthropological Research
- Canada Council
- Canadian Department of External Affairs
- Phi Beta Kappa, Fellow of the Royal Society of Canada

== Research ==
His field experience included excavations at Dinosaur National Monument, Tunisia, Guatemala, Lebanon, and in the United States and Canada in the 1960s and 70s. He was principal investigator and field director of the Coxoh ethnoarchaeological project in Mexico and Guatemala from 1977 to 1985 and conducted archaeological field research in France and British Columbia as well as ethno-archaeological fieldwork in Australia, British Columbia, Polynesia, and Southeast Asia.

His long standing interest has been in understanding how artifacts from the past reveal aspects of the societies and cultures that created the archaeological record. He travelled to Australia to study use of stone tools by Aboriginal peoples of the Western Desert. He conducted a major study of traditional material culture in the Maya Highlands and its relation to social and economic roles of households. His last ethnographic study involved the role of feasting in traditional Southeast Asian societies and how it can be inferred from archaeological remains. He also spent over 30 years excavating a large housepit village in British Columbia. He has authored many books and articles, including:

- Shamans, Sorcerers, and Saints: A Prehistory of Religion
- Archaeology: The Science of Once and Future Things
- The Power of Feasts
- The Power of Ritual in Prehistory: Secret Societies and the Origins of Social Complexity

His Palaeolithic Reflections is considered a foundation work relevant to prehistoric stone technology worldwide. First published in 1979, it is still in print by AIATSIS.

His current Research Includes: 1. Identifying and explaining the archaeological occurrence of corporate groups in British Columbia. 2. Research on feasting as a key component of non-egalitarian societies. 3. Research on secret societies among transegalitarian societies.
