= Patricia Sawin =

American folklorist (born 1956)

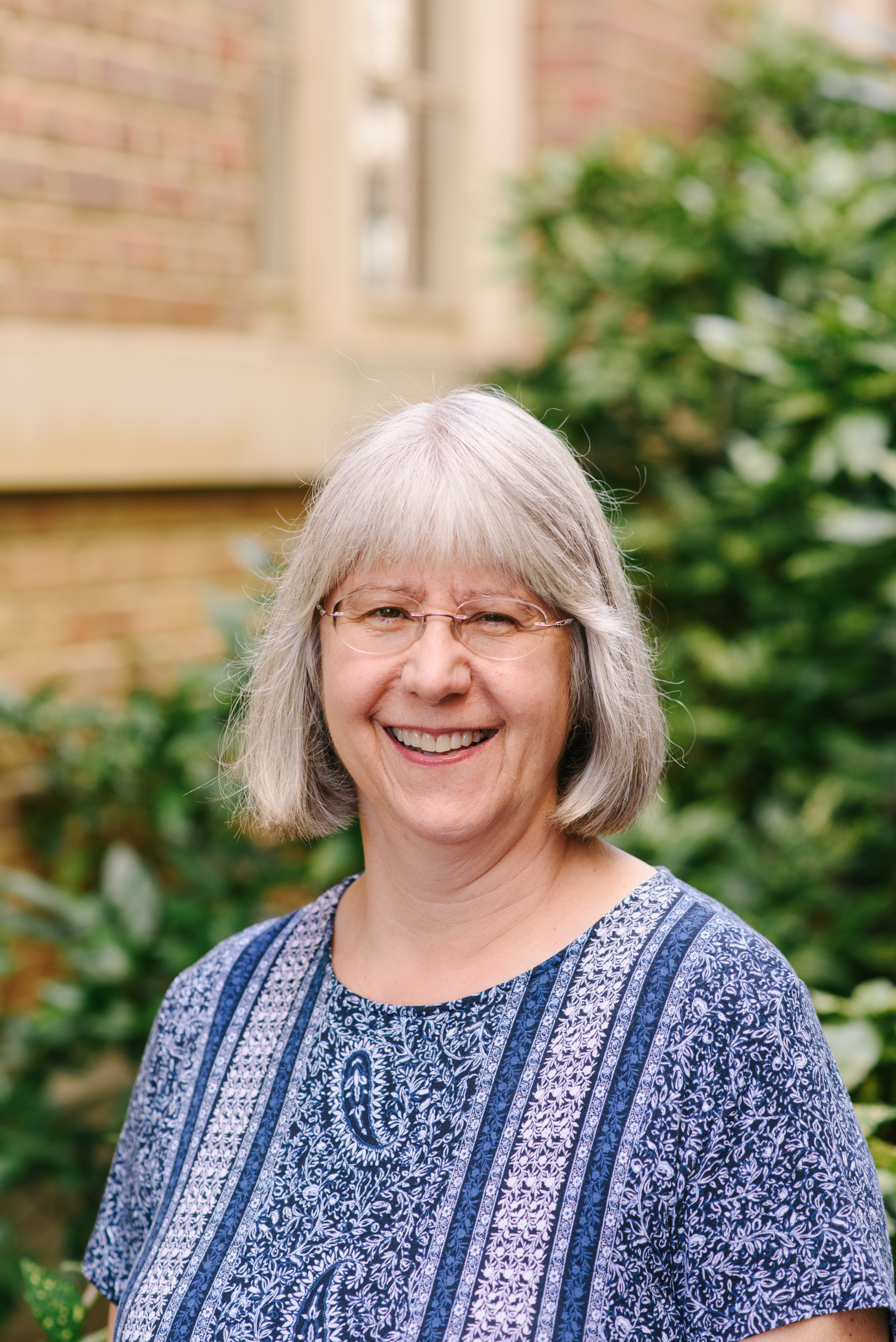
Patricia Sawin, 2018, photo by KC Hysmith

Patricia Elizabeth Sawin (born December 3, 1956) is an American folklorist who focuses her research and teaching on informal narrative, festival, folklore theory, and the culture of adoptive families. She is an associate professor in the Department of American Studies at the University of North Carolina at Chapel Hill where she coordinates the MA program in Folklore. She is a member of the executive board of the American Folklore Society.

== Early life ==
Sawin was born December 3, 1956, in Boulder, Colorado, to Marilynn Daisy Skidmore Sawin and Horace Lewis Sawin. Her father was a member of the English Department, a specialist in Victorian Literature with an early interest in computing in the humanities, and later Associate Dean in the College of Arts and Sciences at the University of Colorado, Boulder. Her mother taught Composition for the Department of English, later worked for the Film Studies program, and helped to establish the program in Women and Gender Studies. She has one sister, Barbara Lewis Sawin Donaldson.

Sawin attended public schools in Boulder for most of her K-12 years, but studied in the 9th grade at Cheltenham Ladies' College, Cheltenham, England, and the 12th grade at Phillips Academy, Andover, Massachusetts, from which she graduated in 1974.

She became interested in the study of traditional culture because of her childhood fascination with fairy tales and her participation as a teenager in international folk dancing. She was an avid hiker in the Colorado mountains and a competitive swimmer.

== Education ==
- Yale University, BA cum laude with honors in English (1974–1978)
- University of Texas at Austin, MA Anthropology with a Concentration in Folklore (1983–1986)
- Indiana University, PhD Folklore (1986–1993)

== Publications ==
- Teaching About Adoption as an Anti-hegemonic and Anti-racist Effort: A View from American Studies. Special issue, Adoption Pedagogy: Challenges, Implications, and Practices. Adoption & Culture 7(1): 115–135. (2019)
- with Milbre Burch. Performance. The Routledge Companion to Media and Fairy-Tale Cultures, ed. Pauline Greenhill, Jill Rudy, Naomi Hamer, and Lauren Bosc, pp. 56–64. New York and London: Routledge. (2018)
- “Every kid is where they’re supposed to be, and it’s a miracle”: Family Formation Stories Among Adoptive Families. Journal of American Folklore 130(518): 394–418. (2017)
- with Katherine Borland and Diane Tye. Introduction: Difference and Dialogism in Family Narratives. Journal of American Folklore 130(518): 377–393. (2017)
- Things Walt Disney Didn't Tell Us (But at Which Rodgers and Hammerstein at Least Hinted): the 1965 Made-for-TV Musical of Cinderella. In Channeling Wonder, ed. Pauline Greenhill and Jill Rudy, pp. 131–158. Detroit, MI: Wayne State University Press. (2014)
- Listening to Stories, Negotiating Responsibility: Exploring the Ethics of International Adoption through Narrative Analysis. In Unsettling Assumptions: Tradition, Gender, Drag, ed. Pauline Greenhill and Diane Tye, pp. 172–190. Logan: Utah State University Press. (2014)
- Stories of Personal Experience. In The New Encyclopedia of Southern Culture: Volume 14: Folklife, ed. Glenn Hinson and William Ferris, general editor, Charles Reagan Wilson, pp. 232–236. Chapel Hill: University of North Carolina Press. (2009)
- with Leslie Rebecca Bloom. Ethical responsibility in feminist activist research: Challenging ourselves to do activist research with women in poverty. International Journal of Qualitative Studies in Education 22(3):333-351. (2009)
- Listening for a Life: A Dialogic Ethnography of Bessie Eldreth through Her Songs and Stories. Logan: Utah State University Press. (2004)
- Performance at the Nexus of Gender, Power, and Desire. Journal of American Folklore 115(455):28-61. (2002)
- Transparent Masks: The Ideology and Practice of Masking in Cajun Country Mardi Gras. Journal of American Folklore 114(451):1-29. (2001)
- Gender, context, and the narrative construction of identity: Rethinking models of “women’s narrative.” In Reinventing Identities: The Gendered Self in Discourse, ed. Mary Bucholtz, A. C. Liang, and Laurel A. Sutton, pp. 241–258. New York: Oxford University Press. (1999)
