= Rachel J. Watkins =

American biocultural anthropologist and educator

- Born: Toledo, Ohio

Academic background
- Education: Howard University; University of Maryland, College Park; University of North Carolina, Chapel Hill

Academic work
- Discipline: Biocultural anthropology
- Institutions: University of Pennsylvania

Rachel J. Watkins is an American biocultural anthropologist and educator. Her research focuses on the physiological impact of poverty and inequality on the human body, with an emphasis "on the biological and social history of African Americans living in the 19th and 20th century urban US".

Watkins currently is an associate professor in the Department of Anthropology at the University of Pennsylvania in Philadelphia PA. She is conducting a long term study on the W. Montague Cobb skeletal collection, which is composed of remains of African-Americans who died in Washington D.C. between 1930 and 1969

== Education ==
Watkins obtained a BA in Anthropology from Howard University in 1994, a MAA in Applied Anthropology from University of Maryland, College Park in 1996, and a PhD in Anthropology from the University of North Carolina, Chapel Hill in 2003.

== Career ==
Watkins is carrying on the work of African-American anthropologists William Montague Cobb and Caroline Bond Day. After obtaining her PhD, Watkins spent a year researching urban African-American populations in the Southeast and East Coast of the United States.

Cobb, whose work has influenced Watkins's research, demonstrated the effect of race on human health. He assembled the collection of skeletons that Watkins is studying. The collection, which resides at Howard University, contains more than 600 skeletons of African Americans who were buried in Washington, D.C. between 1930 and 1969.

Watkins considers herself a scholar-advocate. She primarily studies African Americans and Native Americans, minorities who historically have not been fairly represented in anthropological studies. She hopes to give these underrepresented minorities a voice and to encourage more people of color to join the field of anthropology.

Watkins teaches classes on race, biology and culture, social theory and human biology at University of Pennsylvania in Philadelphia PA.

== Selected publications ==
- Watkins, Rachel; Muller, J (2015). "Repositioning the Cobb human archive: the merger of a skeletal collection and its texts". American Journal of Human Biology. 27 (1): 41–50. doi:10.1002/ajhb.22650. PMID 25380093. S2CID 34005462.
- Watkins, Rachel (2012). "Biohistorical Narratives of Racial Difference in the American Negro". Current Anthropology. 53: 196–209. doi:10.1086/662416. S2CID 146717211.
- Watkins, Rachel J. (2012). "Variation in health and socioeconomic status within the W. Montague Cobb skeletal collection: Degenerative joint disease, trauma and cause of death". International Journal of Osteoarchaeology. 22 (1): 22–44. doi:10.1002/oa.1178. S2CID 58971040.
- Watkins, Rachel J. (2008). "Knowledge from the Margins: W. Montague Cobb's Pioneering Research in Biocultural Anthropology". American Anthropologist. 109 (1): 186–196. doi:10.1525/aa.2007.109.1.186.
