= Thomas Des Jean =

American anthropologist

Thomas Des Jean is an American anthropologist who has conducted extensive field research in the American Southeast, in CRM (cultural resources management), and has worked for over twenty years with the National Park Service. He has recorded over a thousand archaeological sites in the Midsouth, as well as aided in the preservation of sites and the conviction of looters who have destroyed some of the archaeological record in the area.

== Early life ==
Thomas was born in 1948, and lived his early life outside of Indianapolis, Indiana. After graduating from a Catholic high school, he joined the U.S. Navy, where he served for four years. In 1975, he earned a bachelor's degree in Anthropology from the University of Florida, and also minored in Ecology.

== Early archaeological career ==
Des Jean attended several field schools directed by Jerald T. Milanich, a professor at the University of Florida. His first field schools focused on Woodland period sites, the time around 2,000 BC to 1,000 AD, that within the Southeast includes the new technologies of food processing and storage, burial mounds with an emphasis on grave goods, and a great deal of pottery. Perhaps this was an influence that led Tom to choose pottery as a focus for his graduate thesis research. He participated in field schools at a burial mound site on Cades Pond culture sites. Under Milanich, he also participated in a historical archaeology field school that focused on an early-17th-century Spanish mission site.

As an undergraduate, DesJean also worked on several other field projects. These consisted of some archaeological work on small, medium, and large plantation house sites off the coast of Georgia, and excavations of slave quarters. He also worked under the direction of Charles H. Fairbanks, by excavating and testing trash pits associated with 19th-century Orange Hall, a parsonage in St. Mary's, Georgia. Under Fairbanks, Des Jean also worked on the expansion of a Deerfield coal-fired generating station in Florida, as well as the excavation of slave cabins associated with the King Plantation in Georgia.

He went on to become a graduate assistant for various field schools, including at an “Orange II” Late Archaic period campsite. Late Archaic refers to a period from about 5,900 years ago to 3,200 years ago. It was a period characterized by a greater utilization of mussels and other water-available sources. He also worked on the stable and plantation house on the Georgia coast in the Kings Bay Project area. During the Kings Bay Project he also worked on Early Archaic, Orange II, Swift Creek, and Savannah I sites.

== Career ==
Upon graduation with his bachelor's degree, Des Jean spent several years working in contract archaeology. His work included an inventory survey on property in Julington Creek near Jacksonville, Florida. The sites here included the testing of a late-19th-century/early-20th-century black lumber camp, a 19th-century watermill, a small Woodland period St. Johns II campsite, and a 20th-century charcoal-making site. He also worked at the Crooked River State Park in Georgia, doing testing of some Middle Woodland Savannah II phase house mounds.

His MA thesis research was an analysis of pottery vessels from the Little Egypt Site in Carters, Georgia, thought to be the location of the principal town of the 16th-century Coosa chiefdom visited by Hernando de Soto. His research focused on the ceramics in twelve Protohistoric Lamar Phase contact period structural remains at the Little Egypt Site.

The research consisted of collecting clays from around the Carters area and compared them with the clays in the pottery vessels that were found at the Little Egypt Site. The pottery was used for cooking vessels, serving vessels, and vessels for dry and liquid storage. Des Jean received his master's degree in 1986.

The same year he was awarded his master's degree DesJean joined the National Park Service as an Archaeological Technician at The Big South Fork. The Big South Fork is an area on the Cumberland Plateau that includes Scott, Morgan, Fentress, and Pickett counties in Tennessee and McCreary County, Kentucky. The area includes the river gorge, numerous archaeological cliff sites, and the two largest land bridges in the Southeast.

DesJean developed a monitoring plan for the archaeological sites in the park to reduce looting. The area has nearly 300 miles of cliff lines, ridge-top sites, farmsteads, coalmines, coal camps, and farming communities.

The monitoring program included remote sensing devices near a site being regularly looted, and in December 1987, four individuals were caught red-handed. The case did not go to court until 1988, but it became nationally recognized and very significant since it was the first time that the felony threshold for the Archaeological Resources Protection Act of 1979 violations had been invoked.

Des Jean has overseen the recording of some 1,342 archaeological cliff sites in the park, as well as being involved in three additional Archaeological Resources Protection Act looting cases.

Des Jean also has taught various archaeology and sociology classes at Roane State Community College, and has supervised field projects with students. He retired from Big South Fork in 2014 and currently teaches AP high school classes in his spare time. He has a family of four. He lives near the Big South Fork.

== Selected works ==
- Looting Activity: a Folk Tradition of the Upper Cumberland Plateau. Lamar Briefs No.11:6-7. Watkinsville, GA.
- The Archeological Sites Monitoring Program at the Big South Fork National River and Recreation Area, 1986-1989(223-234). In, Protecting the Past, Edited by G. W. Smith and J. E. Erenhard. CRC Press, Boca Raton.
- The Cost Benefit of Making an ARPA Case. In, CRM Bulletin, Vol.13,#4, pp24. National Park Service, Washington, D.C.
- Archeological Teaching Equipment. Tennessee Anthropological Newsletter, Vol. 18, January–February, 1990, No.1. pp2–5.
- The History of Southern Clay Manufacturing Company at Robbins, Tennessee. In Historical Archeology in Kentucky, Edited by K. A. McBride, W. S. McBride and D. Pollack. Kentucky Heritage Council, Frankfort.
- Niter Mining in the Area of the Big South Fork of the Cumberland River (178-225). Tennessee Anthropologist 22(2).
- Chuqualataque (Doublehead). In Tennessee Encyclopedia of History and Culture. Carol Van West, Editor, pp158. Rutledge Hill Press, Nashville.
- Stearns Coal and Lumber Company. In Tennessee Encyclopedia of History and Culture, Carol Van West, Editor, pp884. Rutlege Hill Press, Nashville.
- Inter-Agency Public Archeology: Archeological Testing at BISO1065, the Wet Ledge Rockshelter 1996, (15McY847). In, Archeology in Kentucky, Edited by K. A. McBride, W.S. McBride and D. Pollack. Kentucky Heritage Council, Frankfort.
- Volume 1: The Kings Bay and Devils Walkingstick Sites. 1986 William Hampton Adams, editor, with contributions by William Hampton Adams, Thomas Desjean, Christopher Espenshade, Rebecca Saunders, and Karen Jo Walker.
- The Archaeology of Mission Santa Catalina de Guale: 1. Search and Discovery. 1987 editor, David Hurst Thomas with research contributions by Thomas Desjean, Rebecca Saunders, and Karen Jo Walker.

== Awards ==
In 2004, after his third successful ARPA case, he was awarded the “Outstanding Service in Archaeological Resource Protection” award by The National Park Service.
