= Karel Josephy =

Dr. iur. Karel Josephy (13.3.1895, Tábor - 12.6.1968, Oltyne Castle) was a Czechoslovak businessman the secretary of commerce of Kutná Hora tobacco factory (nowadays Philip Morris International) and chief executive officer of tobacco factory in Tábor, Bohemia. Czechoslovak Tobacco industry was the leading force of the Austro-Hungarian empire.

== Life ==
Karel Josephy was born in family of state officers. During World War I (1915 - 1918) he served as first lieutenant in war service. His working life in tobacco industry was spent within former Austro - Hungarian areal: Eger tobacco factory (secretary of commerce), Košice (secretary of commerce), Mukacheve (secretary of commerce) Kutná Hora and Tábor.

== Awards ==
Karel Josephy was the first breeder of legendary Borzoi Grifo Karolinger von Wienerwald, which established breeding lineages in Europe and Russia.
