= Binkley Brothers' Dixie Clodhoppers =

Historical string band in United States

- Also known as: Binkley Brothers' Clodhoppers
- Origin: Cheatham County, Tennessee, United States
- Genre: Old-time
- Years active: 1926–1938
- Label: Victor
- Past members: Amos Binkley; Gale Binkley; Tom Andrews; Jack Jackson

The Binkley Brothers' Dixie Clodhoppers were an American Old-time string band consisting of Amos Binkley (1888–1952) on banjo, his brother Gale Binkley (1893–1946) on fiddle, Tom Andrews on guitar, and Jack Jackson on guitar and vocals. The Binkley Brothers first performed on Nashville radio station WSM in 1926, and in 1928 became one of the first bands to record commercially in the city. The group performed regularly on the Grand Ole Opry until they disbanded in 1938.

Amos and Gale Binkley were born in Cheatham County, Tennessee, and were working as jewelry repairmen when they started playing for WSM in 1926. The Binkleys eventually joined up with Franklin-born guitarist Thomas William aka "Tom" Andrews (1901–1984), Lawrenceburg, Tennessee, he worked for the L & N Railroad then as a farmer, and Jonas "Jack" Jackson (1909–1994) Wilson County, Tennessee, a builder of farm equipment. The group was given the name "Binkley Brothers' Dixie Clodhoppers" by Opry founder George D. Hay, who preferred rural-sounding band names to fit the show's barn dance format. In September 1928, the group attempted to record several sides for Victor Records at the YMCA building in Nashville, but Victor's A&R agent Ralph Peer decided the group's vocals were too "rough." Peer added Lebanon, Tennessee, singer Jack Jackson to the line-up, and on October 2, the band made its first recordings. The group continued performing on the Opry throughout the following decade, and by the early 1930s Jackson— who was known as the "Strolling Yodeler"— was one of the most popular singers on Nashville-area radio.

The band's repertoire included "I'll Rise When the Rooster Crows," which was derived from the 1881 song "Dem Golden Shoes," and the folk song "Give Me Back My Fifteen Cents." Both were recorded at their 1928 Victor sessions. When the Binkley Brothers left the Opry in 1938, they were replaced by Bill Monroe and the Bluegrass Boys.

== Discography ==
- Nashville - The Early String Bands, Vol. 1 (County, 2000) — contains the tracks "I'll Rise When the Rooster Crows" and "Give Me Back My Fifteen Cents"
