= Timothy Binkley =

American art historian

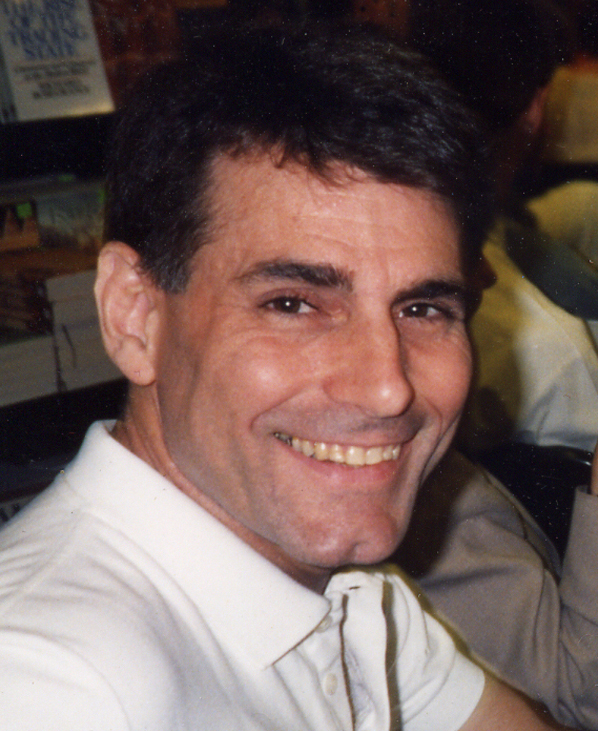
- Timothy Binkley in Greenwich Village, NY (1995).
- Born: September 14, 1943 (age 82); Baltimore, Maryland, U.S.
- Education: University of Colorado Boulder (BA, MA); University of Texas at Austin (PhD)
- Occupations: Philosopher; artist

Timothy Binkley (born Timothy Glenn Binkley; September 14, 1943) is an American philosopher, artist, and teacher known for his writings about conceptual art and aesthetics, as well as several essays that helped to define computer art. He is also known for his interactive art installations from the late 1980s and early 1990s.

== Overview ==
Timothy Binkley studied mathematics at University of Colorado at Boulder, earning a B.A. (1965) and an M.A. (1966). His doctorate in philosophy, from the University of Texas at Austin (1970), explored Ludwig Wittgenstein's use of language.

Binkley has taught at several colleges and universities in the United States. He taught philosophy at the University of Notre Dame for three years before moving to New York. He was subsequently hired to chair the Humanities Department at the School of Visual Arts, which under his leadership became the Humanities and Science Department. In 1982 he initiated the first computer art courses, which led to formal graduate and undergraduate programs in computer art. He went on to chair the MFA Computer Art program, the first of its kind in the country.

In 1992, he founded the New York Digital Salon, an international exhibition of computer art.

His work has been supported by a number of grants, including from the Ford Foundation and the National Endowment for the Humanities.

== Philosophy ==
Binkley postulates that 20th-century art is a strongly self-critical discipline, which creates ideas free of traditional piece-specifying conventions including aesthetic parameters and qualities. If an artwork is a piece, that piece isn't necessarily an aesthetic object—or an object at all. Binkley states that anything that can be thought about or referred to can be labeled an artwork by an artist.

Binkley argues that the computer is neither a medium nor a tool, since both media and tools have inherent characteristics that can be explored through an artist's gestures or physical events for mark-making. Instead, the computer is a chameleon-like or even promiscuous assistant, whose services can be applied to any number of tasks and whose capabilities can be defined endlessly from application to application. Binkley refers to the computer as a non-specific technology and an incorporeal metamedium. Yet the computer contains phenomena not found in other media: namely, a conceptual space where symbolic content can be modified using mathematical abstractions. The notion of an “original” and its consequent value are considered irrelevant, obsolete, or inapplicable to computer art.

Binkley's philosophy extends beyond art and aesthetics to culture itself, whose foundations he believes we are overhauling through our involvement with computers.

Several of his essays have been translated into French, and his most-cited essay, "Piece: Contra Aesthetics," has been anthologized repeatedly, most recently in 1996 in Aesthetics in Perspective, edited by Katherine Higgins.

== Art and Software ==
Since the late 1980s, Binkley has exhibited his interactive art in the United States, Europe, South America, and Asia. His 1994 work Rest Rooms was a prescient exploration of changing expectations around privacy and gender in public rest rooms at the dawn of the internet age. In this installation, two rest rooms were networked together with video cameras so that people in the two space could talk to each other. There was also a virtual space that allowed the users to draw or write together in real time.

Books of Change (1993) was a slightly tongue-in-cheek take on the morphing software that was just becoming popular in the early 1990s. In this installation, users could interject their own image between two entirely different images (for example, a frog and a car). The resulting morph between the three images could then be output as a flip book.

In 1991, Binkley created Watch Yourself, his most exhibited interactive artwork. Here, users stand in front of a screen and attempt to intersect their image with an image fragment (often a picture frame) that is slowly falling down the screen. Once their image is thus captured, it gets placed inside the famous painting from which the image fragment came. Through this virtual iconoclasm, the users become subjects in paintings they have only known as viewers.

Binkley has also created stand-alone software. In 1992, he published Symmetry Studio, an application for creating and learning about visual symmetries. Developed for early Macintosh computers in collaboration with the artist John F. Simon Jr., it came with a handbook. Then, in 1996, he founded the company TR Squared with film producer Ron Kastner to create computer games targeted to women and girls.

== Bibliography ==
=== Books ===
- Symmetry Studio: Computer-Aided Surface Design. New York: Van Nostrand Reinhold, 1992. With John F. Simon Jr. Includes surface design software on CD.
- Wittgenstein's Language. The Hague: Martinus Nijhoff, 1973.

=== Selected articles ===
- “A Philosophy of Computer Art by Lopes, Dominic McIver,” Journal of Aesthetics and Art Criticism 68(4), (2010): 409–411.
- "Autonomous Creations: Birthing Intelligent Agents", Leonardo 31(5), Sixth Annual New York Digital Salon (1998): 333–336.
- "Computer Art" and "Digital Media". In Encyclopedia of Aesthetics, New York: Oxford University Press, 1998. 1:412–414, 2:47–50.
- "The Vitality of Digital Creation," The Journal of Aesthetics and Art Criticism, 55(2), Perspectives on the Arts and Technology. (Spring, 1997): 107–116.
- “Transparent Technology: The Swan Song of Electronics," Leonardo 28(5), Special Issue "The Third Annual New York Digital Salon" (1995): 427–432.
- "Creating Symmetric Patterns with Objects and Lists", Symmetry: Culture and Science, 6(1), (1995).
- "The Computer is Not a Medium", Philosophic Exchange (Fall/Winter, 1988/89). Reprinted in EDB & kunstfag, Rapport Nr. 48, NAVFs EDB-Senter for Humanistisk Forskning. Translated as "L'ordinateur n'est pas un médium", Esthétique des arts médiatiques, Sainte-Foy, Québec: Presses de l'Université du Québec, 1995.
- "Refiguring Culture." In Future Visions: New Technologies of the Screen, London: British Film Institute Publications, (1993): 90–122.
- "Postmodern Torrents," Millennium Film Journal 23/24 (Winter 1990–91): 130–141.
- "The Quickening of Galatea." Art Journal 49:3 (1990): 233-240.
- "Computed Space", National Computer Graphics Association Conference Proceedings, (1987): 643–652.
- "Conceptual Art: Appearance and Reality", Art in Culture, 1, edited by A. Balis, L. Aagaard-Mogensen, R. Pinxten, F. Vandamme (Ghent, Belgium: Communication & Cognition Publishers, 1985). Proceedings of the Ghent colloquium "Art in Culture."
- "Piece: Contra Aesthetics", The Journal of Aesthetics and Art Criticism, 35(3), (Spring 1977): 265–277. A French translation first appeared in Poétique 79 (September, 1989).
- "Deciding About Art", Culture and Art, edited by Lars Aagaard-Mogensen (Atlantic Highlands, N.J.: Humanities Press, 1976).

== Exhibitions ==
- Rest Rooms, interactive telecommunications installation with video-conferenced computers, exhibited at SIGGRAPH ’94 in Orlando, FL., Wexner Center for the Arts in Columbus, OH (April 1–30, 1995), Schloss Agathenberg in Germany (September 24 – November 26, 1995), Schloß Arolsen in Germany (February 24 – April 14, 1996).
- Books of Change, interactive computer installation exhibited in "Tomorrow's Realities", SIGGRAPH 1994. Included in the "Multimedia Playground" at the Exploratorium in San Francisco (February 12 – March 13, 1994). Exhibited at the Hong Kong Arts Centre in Hong Kong (June 26–29, 1994), the Central Academy of Art and Design in Beijing (July 4–8, 1994), and Camera Obscura in Tel Aviv (October 16–20, 1994).
- Watch Yourself, interactive computer installation. Included in "Tomorrow's Realities" exhibit at SIGGRAPH '91 in Las Vegas (July 29 – August 2, 1991). Exhibited at the National Conference on Computing and Values, New Haven (August 12–16, 1991). Accepted for Ars Electronica in Linz, Austria (1992). Exhibited at Videobrasil International Videofestival in São Paulo (September 21–27, 1992). Exhibited at Digital Jambalaya in New York City (November 16 – December 1, 1992) in conjunction with the international TRIP '92 event. Demonstration tape included on Computer Graphics Access '89-'92 videodisks (Bunkensha: Tokyo, 1992); Electronic Dictionary videodisks (G.R.A.M.: Montréal, 1993). Exhibited at Images du Futur in Montréal (May 13 – September 19, 1993). Exhibited at Vidéoformes in France (April 6–23, 1994). Shown at the Solomon R. Guggenheim Museum in New York City (June 2, 1994). Included in "Art for the End of the Century: Art and Technology" at the Reading Public Museum (July 23, 1995 – January 1, 1996). Exhibited at ciberfestival 96 in Lisbon, Portugal (February 9 – March 17, 1996). Permanent installation at Tempozan Contemporary Museum in Osaka, Japan (opened in September 1996).

== Personal life ==
Binkley is married to artist and author Sonya Shannon and has a daughter Shelley Binkley, M.D., from a previous marriage to Sue Binkley Tatem.
