= General Anthropology =

- Discipline: Anthropology
- Language: English

Publication details
- History: 1994–present
- Publisher: Wiley-Blackwell for the General Anthropology Division of the American Anthropological Association (United States of America)

Standard abbreviations
- ISO 4: Gen. Anthropol.

Indexing
- ISSN: 1537-1727

Links
- Journal homepage

General Anthropology is an anthropology journal edited by Dave McCurdy and Patricia C. Rice. It is published in May and November by Wiley-Blackwell for the General Anthropology Division of the American Anthropological Association. It publishes information in the fields of anthropology and applied anthropology.
