= Phillip Harold Lewis =

American anthropologist (1922 – 2011)

- Born: July 31, 1922; Chicago, Illinois
- Died: December 10, 2011 (aged 89); Evanston, Illinois
- Education: Ph.D. in Anthropology, University of Chicago
- Occupation(s): Anthropologist, Museologist
- Spouse: Sally Rappaport
- Children: David, Betty, Emily

Phillip Harold Lewis (July 31, 1922 – December 10, 2011) was an American anthropologist, museologist, and amateur photographer and artist. His work in Anthropology centered on Melanesia, a subregion in Oceania, and he was the Curator of Anthropology at the Field Museum in Chicago, Illinois, from 1957 until 1992. His work in Oceania has helped build both the collections and research capabilities in the Field Museum and has paved the way for further anthropological work on this area by the museum.

== Biography and education ==
Lewis was born in Chicago on July 31, 1922, the son of Lithuanian Jewish immigrants. He grew up speaking Yiddish at home and English at school. He was raised in Chicago's North Side and graduated from Lane Technical High School in 1940. In high school, Lewis became interested in various art forms, and crafted a violin which was later used by his children (two of whom became professional musicians). He was also a skilled photographer and cartoonist for the school newspaper.

During World War II, he entered the United States Army Air Corps and was stationed in Alaska (Aleutian Islands) as a weather forecaster from 1942 to 1945. When he returned from service, he attended school at the Art Institute of Chicago, from which he received a degree. After attaining this degree, Lewis pursued and received a PhD in anthropology from the University of Chicago.

Phillip Lewis died on December 10, 2011, at the age of 89 at Mathar Pavilion, a nursing facility in Evanston.

== Professional life ==
=== The Field Museum ===
Lewis was hired by the Field Museum in 1957 as the curator of what was then called "primitive art"; he later became Curator of Anthropology. His initial assignment was to develop the material on Oceanic culture in the Department of Oceanic Anthropology, particularly that of the island of New Ireland. His research done on New Ireland resulted in a book on the island's culture. Lewis helped to install Pacific Hall, a permanent exhibit on Polynesian, Micronesian and Melanesian cultures. His exhibit on Melanesian culture is on the upper level of the museum and is still very successful because of his intimate research and knowledge of the Melanesian region. He kept his post at the Field Museum until he retired in 1992, marking an almost 40-year period as one of the longest-serving curators at the museum.

Lewis chaired the Anthropology department at the Field from 1975 until 1979. He is remembered today as the first and only curator at the museum to focus on how art and society relate to one another. He can be said to have helped bridge the gap between what natural history and anthropology museums do and what art museums do, and how their methods can be combined.

=== Research areas ===
Lewis's area of study in anthropology was in Melanesian culture and art, focusing on funerary customs and other ritualistic ceremonies. In his lifetime, he traveled to Papua New Guinea in the village of Lesu for three extended, months-long periods to study their culture. His first trip was in the 1950s by propeller plane (the other two being in the 1970s and 1980s). In the process of his travels, he collected hundreds of items for use in the Field Museum, including masks, woven baskets, musical instruments, and other various pieces of art (over 100 of these artifacts come from New Ireland). Many of these items are still on exhibit today at the Field Museum

== Works ==
=== Published materials ===
- 1961 A Definition of Primitive Art. Chicago: Chicago Natural History Museum, 26 pp. ISBN 1175845302.
- 1969 The Social Context of Art in Northern Ireland. Chicago: Field Museum of Natural History, 186 pp.
- 1970 New Ireland: Coming and Going. Chicago: Field Museum of Natural History, 9 pp.

=== Unpublished materials ===
15 linear feet of unprocessed materials at the Field Museum, Chicago, Illinois. Details work done by Lewis while at the Field Museum (information as of 28 September 2012 from Armand Esai, archivist at the Field Museum).

== Bibliography ==
- Drews, Katies (2011-12-18). "Phillip Harold Lewis, former curator of anthropology at the Field Museum, dies". Chicago Sun Times.
- Kates, Joan (2011-12-19). "Phillip Harold Lewis, 1922–2011". Chicago Tribune.
- "Phillip Harold Lewis". Chicago Tribune.
- "History". Research and Collections: Anthropology. The Field Museum. 2007.
- "Melanesian Collections". The Field Museum. 2012.
