= J. Patrick Gray =

American anthropologist

J. Patrick Gray is professor emeritus of anthropology at the University of Wisconsin–Milwaukee.

His research fields are holocultural research, sociobiology, methodology, and religion. He received his PhD degree from the University of Colorado at Boulder in 1974. He has authored sixteen articles, one book, co-edited another book with James Silverberg, and was Editor of the World Cultures eJournal from 1992 to 2013.

== Selected publications ==
- Gray, J. Patrick (1985). Primate sociobiology. New Haven, Connecticut: HRAF Press. ISBN 978-0-87536-344-8.
- Silverberg, James; Gray, J. Patrick, eds. (1992). Aggression and Peacefulness in Humans and Other Primates. New York: Oxford University Press. ISBN 978-0-19-507119-1.
