= Association for Feminist Anthropology =

Feminist anthropology organization

- Abbreviation: AFA
- Formation: 1988; 38 years ago
- Founded at: Phoenix, Arizona
- Region served: United States of America
- Leader: Carla Jones
- President-Elect: Jennifer Wies
- Parent organization: American Anthropological Association
- Website: http://afa.americananthro.org/

The Association for Feminist Anthropology (AFA), a section of the American Anthropological Association, is an American professional organization founded in 1988 to support the development of feminist analytic perspective in all areas of anthropology.

== History ==
Feminist anthropology is an integrative approach to anthropology, combining the fields of biology, culture, linguistics and archaeology. The discipline originated in the 1970s and developed from two earlier phases: the anthropology of women and the anthropology of gender. Feminist anthropology was formally recognized as a subdiscipline of anthropology in the late 1970s.

The history of the Association for Feminist Anthropology began in 1988, when a group of American anthropologists met in Phoenix, Arizona with the goal of establishing, "in the beginning, an 'anthropology of women' and later, a feminist and gendered anthropology to the discipline". The organization's founding leaders are: Naomi Quinn, Carole Hill, Sylvia Forman, Rayna Rapp and Louise Lamphere. The group recognized the need for anthropologists who studied subjects of gender and gender equality, to have their own professional space within anthropology. The Association for Feminist Anthropology (AFA) was formally established by unanimous vote in the 1988 meeting, and formally approved as a section of the American Anthropological Association, soon afterward.

The beginning years of the AFA saw the establishment of several areas of interest that continue today. Currently, the major themes that are the focus of working commissions within the organization are: Gender and the Curriculum, Women and Human Rights, and the Commission on Women’s Reproductive Rights and Bodily Autonomy.

== Awards and scholarship ==
=== Michelle Rosaldo Book Prize ===
AFA's Michelle Rosaldo Book Prize is named after anthropologist, Michelle Rosaldo, the co-editor of Woman, Culture and Society, the 1974 publication that was instrumental in launching the field of feminist anthropology. The first book award is given to an anthropologist who makes an exceptional contribution to the field of feminist anthropology.

=== Sylvia Forman Prize ===
The Sylvia Forman Prize is named for the late Sylvia Helen Forman, a founding leader of the AFA, and a dedicated scholar and teacher, whose work was a major contribution to feminist anthropology. The annual award will be given to one graduate and one undergraduate student.

== Publications ==
=== AFA annual journals ===
The official journal Voices was published annually until Spring, 2019. The current journal, Feminist Anthropology will began its first term, beginning in July, 2019.

=== Books ===
The AFA has published three edited volumes: From Labrador to Samoa: Theory and Practice of Eleanor Burke Leacock, Gender and Race through Education and Political Activism: The Legacy of Sylvia Helen Forman, and Feminism, Nationalism and Militarism.
