= Separate spheres =

Gendered separation of public and private spheres

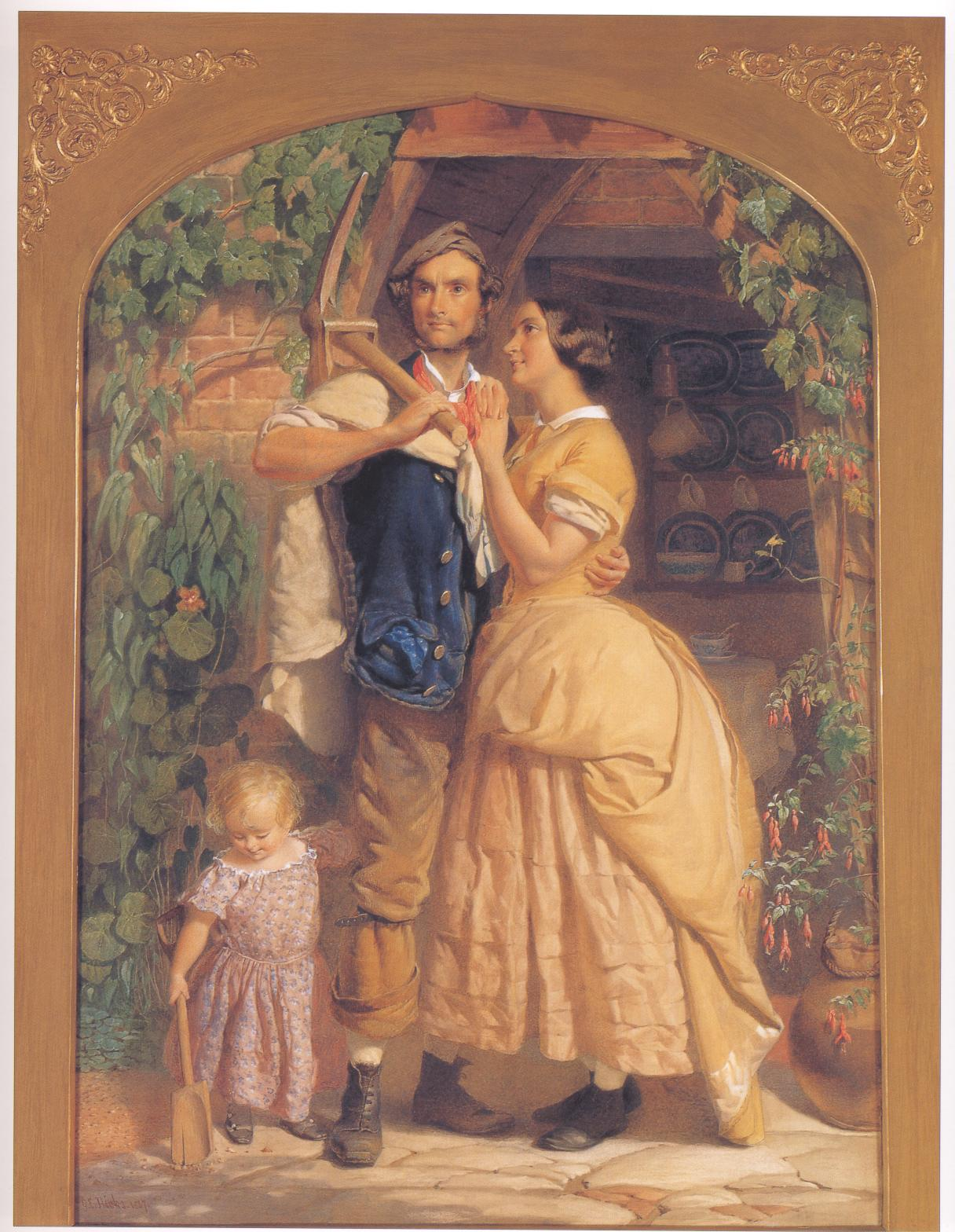
The Sinews of Old England (1857) by George Elgar Hicks shows a couple "on the threshold" between female and male spheres.

Terms such as separate spheres and domestic–public dichotomy refer to a social phenomenon within modern societies that feature, to some degree, an empirical separation between a domestic or private sphere and a public or social sphere. This observation may be controversial and is often also seen as supporting patriarchal ideologies that seek to create or strengthen any such separation between spheres and to confine women to the domestic/private sphere.

The patriarchal ideology of separate spheres, based primarily on notions of biologically determined gender roles and/or patriarchal religious doctrine, claims that women should avoid the public sphere – the domain of politics, paid work, commerce and law. Women's "proper sphere", according to the ideology, is the realm of domestic life, focused on childcare, housekeeping and religion.

In Europe and North America, the idealization of separate spheres emerged during the Industrial Revolution. As an observable phenomenon, however, the existence of separate spheres is much older.

== History ==
The idea that women should inhabit a separate domestic sphere has appeared in Western thought for centuries, extending back to the ancient Greeks. In Politics, Aristotle described two separate spheres in Greek society, the home (oikos) and the city (polis). Some have interpreted his views as confining women to the private realm while men were supposed to occupy the public sphere of the polis. Each sphere intermingled in different ways with the other. Debates over the "proper" roles of women and men continued throughout antiquity.

The modern ideology of separate spheres emerged in the wake of the Industrial Revolution. Prior to the industrialization of the Western world, family members worked side by side and the workplace was located mostly in and around the home. With the shift from home-based to factory production, men left the home to sell their labor for wages while women stayed home to perform unpaid domestic work. The separate spheres ideology reflected and fueled these changes. At the same time, the Enlightenment and the French Revolution helped spread the ideas of liberty, equality and political rights, but in practice such rights were denied to women, who were seen as belonging to a different social sphere. Feminist writers like Olympe de Gouges, Mary Wollstonecraft and Lucy Stone demanded political equality for women as well as men and provided searing criticisms of the "separate sphere" ideals that confined women exclusively to the domestic sphere. Theorists such as Friedrich Engels and Karl Marx have argued that following the rise of capitalism, the home lost its control of the means of production and consequently became a private, separate sphere. As a result, Engels contended, women were excluded from participating directly in the production process and relegated to the subordinate domestic sphere.

Another major commentator on the modern idea of "separate spheres" was the French political thinker Alexis de Tocqueville. In Democracy in America (1840), in a chapter entitled How the Americans understand the Equality of the sexes, Tocqueville wrote: "In no country has such constant care been taken as in America to trace two clearly distinct lines of action for the two sexes and to make them keep pace one with the other, but in two pathways that are always different." He observed that married women, in particular, were subject to many restrictions, noting that "the independence of woman is irrecoverably lost in the bonds of matrimony", adding that "in the United States the inexorable opinion of the public carefully circumscribes woman within the narrow circle of domestic interests and duties and forbids her to step beyond it." Tocqueville considered the separate spheres of women and men a positive development, arguing:

although the women of the United States are confined within the narrow circle of domestic life and their situation is in some respects one of extreme dependence, I have nowhere seen women occupying a loftier position; and if I were asked...to what the singular prosperity and growing strength of that people ought mainly to be attributed, I should reply,—to the superiority of their women.

Betty Friedan's The Feminine Mystique (1963) asserted that women were being forced to rely on their husbands and children as the sole sources of their identity by an historically constructed oppressive paradigm, not by any "intrinsic" predisposition. Drawing on Friedan, historian Barbara Welter identified a "Cult of True Womanhood", an ideal of femininity prevalent among the upper and middle classes in the 19th century. "True women" were supposed to be pious, pure, submissive and domestic. Domesticity, in particular, was regarded as a laudable virtue as the home was considered a woman's proper sphere. Unlike Tocqueville, Welter and other 20th-century historians were critical of the separate spheres ideology, seeing it as a source of women's denigration.

In Woman, Culture, and Society (1974), Michelle Rosaldo emphasizes the idea that these separate spheres can be explained in terms of a dichotomy, in the sense that these gender-oriented domains are viewed as so totally separate that it only reinforces the ideology of gender separation and inequality. Activities given to men, versus those assigned to women, were seen as having more value and contributing greatly to the society. Adversely, the woman's so-called simpler roles of housework and childrearing were held at a much lesser value. Rosaldo argues a "universal asymmetry" between the sexes that primarily caused these separations to arise. This model mainly focuses on the generational subordination of women in relation to men throughout history and across different cultures, defining the domestic and public spheres in very black and white terms.

This earlier model, has since been challenged by researchers in the field, claiming the spheres cannot be outlined in such simplistic terms. Woman, Culture, and Society co-editor Louis Lamphere breaks down Rosaldo's model and discusses the spheres in different terms. Rather than assume universal asymmetry, Lamphere considers various societies worldwide. Even in some Middle Eastern cultures that place women in extreme positions of subordination, the model could not be so easily applied. This is because the domestic and public spheres are almost always overlapping in some way, regardless of a cultural female subservience or even egalitarianism. Women enter public spaces in order to fulfill duties that fall within their domestic responsibilities. Men must return to the private, or domestic, space eventually to bring home the spoils of labor from the public sphere. In this sense, there are two separate spheres created and enforced by gender ideologies; but they are not dichotomous. They, instead, form an integrated system of life in society, varying only in levels of intensities from culture to culture.

According to Cary Franklin, the women’s rights movements in the mid-1960s proposed that to achieve true equality between the sexes, it would be necessary for laws to be put in place to move past the simple separate spheres model and address the “interspherical impacts”. In 1966, the National Organization for Women (NOW) pushed for equality of women in society and in the workplace by means of changes in family regulation. NOW stressed the importance of focusing on structurally altering the family sphere to create gender equality in the education and workplace spheres. The family sphere acted as a catalyst, because: unless it changed, women would simply lack access to the opportunities already available to men. Franklin also pointed out that the gender inequality among the American population in the 60’s and 70’s was a major contributor to the civil rights statutes of the Second Reconstruction.

Deborah Rotman, an anthropologist at Notre Dame, analyzed this concept of separate spheres among the people of Deerfield, Massachusetts in the late nineteenth and early twentieth century. In this community, there was a clear divide between men and women by means of a "proper allocation" in which females were given the domestic residence or sphere and the men were given the "economically productive agricultural land". Men would migrate away from the women if agriculture was depleting in their given agricultural space. As the men were moving to work outside the home, women began to acclimate to the economic atmosphere and gain more opportunities in the public sphere with all the men working elsewhere. These women soon had various roles in the public and private spheres in Deerfield. As equal rights became part of the ideological framework in Deerfield, women found themselves voting in school boards, working on municipal water projects and fundraising as men had done before them. Despite the traditional understanding of the late nineteenth and early twentieth century of completely separate public and private spheres, the Deerfield community challenged these "dichotomies of domesticity" and paved the way for equal rights for men and women.

== Influences ==
=== Biological determinism ===
The separation between female and male spheres was heavily influenced by biological determinism, the notion that women and men are naturally suitable for different social roles due to their biological and genetic makeup. The idea of biological determinism was popular during the Age of Enlightenment and among such thinkers as Jean-Jacques Rousseau who argued that women were inherently different from men and should devote themselves to reproduction and domesticity. Women were considered passive, dependent on men and, due to their reproductive capacity, ill-suited for life outside the domestic realm. Rousseau described women's primary duties in Emile, or On Education, stating that "women's entire education should be planned in relation to men. To please men, to be useful to them, to win their love and respect, to raise them as children, to care for them as adults, correct and console them, make their lives sweet and pleasant; these are women's duties in all ages and these are what they should be taught from childhood."

The popular beliefs about inherent sex differences remained deeply embedded in popular consciousness throughout the Progressive Era. By the early 20th century, however, dissident anthropologists and other social scientists began to challenge the biological determination of human behavior, revealing great similarities between men and women and suggesting that many sex differences were socially constructed. Despite these new insights and social and economic changes such as women's entry into the labor force, the separate spheres ideology did not disappear.

=== Other influences ===
"Woman has no call to the ballot-box, but she has a sphere of her own, of amazing responsibility and importance. She is the divinely appointed guardian of the home...She should more fully realize that her position as wife and mother and angel of the home, is the holiest, most responsible and queenlike assigned to mortals; and dismiss all ambition for anything higher, as there is nothing else here so high for mortals."

— Rev. John Milton Williams, Woman Suffrage, Bibliotheca Sacra (1893)

Women's confinement to the private sphere was reinforced by cultural and legal arrangements, such as the lack of women's suffrage, legal prohibitions against women undertaking professions like medicine and law and discouragement from obtaining higher education.

Strong support for the separation of spheres came from antisuffragists who relied on the notion of inherent sexual differences to argue that women were unfit for political participation. Antifeminist men's groups in late 19th and early 20th century United States responded to the societal changes and shift in gender relations by advocating a return to a strict separation of spheres that would keep women from competing with men in the public sphere.

Similarly, Christian fundamentalists supported the separate spheres ideology and opposed women's suffrage as well as other attempts to broaden women's influence in the public sphere. Theological conservatism has been found to have a stable effect on the endorsement of separate spheres ideology. Leading evangelicals propagated a view of womanhood which reinforced gendered division. Thomas Gisborne's An Enquiry into the Duties of the Female Sex (1797) and Henry Venn's The Complete Duty of Man (1763) were two popular evangelical texts which described proper behavior for men and women, arguing that a woman's primary duty was to care for those in her domestic circle and obey her husband.

== Effects ==
In her paper "Separate Spheres or Shared Dominions", Cathy Ross suggests that the separate spheres ideology had ambiguous effects on women's lives. She argues that while it "was clear that women were supposed to be subordinate and that home and children were their sphere", the separation of spheres enabled women "to reach out to other women in sisterhood, in solidarity, on the common ground of domesticity".

The ideology of separate spheres contributed to resistance to coeducation and to the emergence of gendered educational institutions such as the female seminary and women's college in higher education and the woman's club in continuing education. The rise of teaching as a woman's profession was also closely linked to the ideology of separate spheres, as women came to be regarded as uniquely skilled at classroom management. In coeducational universities in the late 19th century, the separation of spheres contributed to the emergence of home economics as a field of advanced study for the woman's sphere, and the dean of women as frequently the only high-ranking woman administrator in coeducational institutions.

Although it created a space for women's academic and professional advancement, the separation of spheres also provided an excuse for keeping women out of fields not specifically marked as female. Thus many talented women scientists were pushed into professorships in home economics rather than in their principal fields. Some women educators resisted this typecasting even while working within the framework of separation. Frances Shimer, founder of Shimer College, which was a woman's school from 1866 to 1950, insisted that she was "in favor of the co-education of the sexes" and that the education at her school was equal to what was given to young men. In the 21st century, the legacy of the separation of spheres has a lasting impact perpetuating the separation of various academic and professional fields into gendered areas.

== Recent commentary ==
A 2013 study by Jacqueline Henke from Arkansas State University explores the history of the separate spheres model in the United States. Henke points out that between 1820 and 1860 (a period sometimes called the dawn of separate spheres) three parenting models were common for two-parent, mother/father families:

1. Parenting duties are wholly the responsibility of mothers
2. Parenting duties are separated into fatherly responsibilities and motherly responsibilities
3. Parenting duties are shared equally among mothers and fathers.

According to Henke, many parenting books from this era suggested that mothers should take primary responsibility for their children. Yet, some parenting books argued that mothers and fathers should have separate childrearing duties or a completely equal distribution of childrearing responsibilities. Henke argues that, even during the height of domestic ideology and the dawn of separate spheres, parenting advice was not monolithic. Furthermore, the lived realities parents and families during this era were more diverse than the ideals of parenting books.

== See also ==
- Agnotology
- Cult of Domesticity
- Gender binary
- Gender essentialism
- Gender polarization
- Gender role
- Hostile worlds
- The Angel in the House
