= Smadar Lavie =

Israeli anthropologist

- סמדר לביא
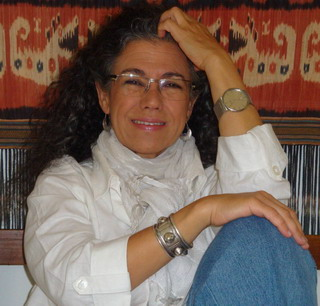
- Smadar Lavie
- Born: March 5, 1955 (age 71)
- Employer: University of California, Davis

Academic background
- Education: Hebrew University of Jerusalem (B.A., 1980); University of California, Berkeley (PhD, 1989)
- Thesis: The Poetics of Military Occupation: Mzeina Allegories of Bedouin Identity under Israeli and Egyptian Rule

Academic work
- Discipline: Anthropology

Smadar Lavie (Hebrew: סמדר לביא; born 5 March 1955) is an Israeli Mizrahi anthropologist, author, and activist. She is professor emerita of anthropology at the University of California, Davis. She specializes in the anthropology of Egypt, Israel and Palestine, emphasizing issues of race, gender and religion. She received her doctorate in anthropology from the University of California at Berkeley (1989).

== Academic life ==
Lavie received her BA in social anthropology from the Hebrew University of Jerusalem in 1980 (majors: sociology and social anthropology; minors: medieval Islamic civilization, musicology). Lavie received her Ph.D. in cultural anthropology from the University of California, Berkeley, in 1989 and was awarded the Malcolm H. Kerr Dissertation Award from the Middle East Studies Association for her dissertation titled, "The Poetics of Military Occupation: Mzeina Allegories of Bedouin Identity under Israeli and Egyptian Rule" which was later published by the University of California Press, and received the 1990 honorable mention of the Victor Turner Award for Ethnographic Writing.

In 1990, Lavie became an assistant professor of anthropology and critical theory at the University of California, Davis, where she was promoted to an associate professorship in 1994. Lavie held visiting professorships at Diablo Valley College (1984), University of California, Berkeley's Fall Freshman Program (1985–1989), Stanford University (1994), Beit Berl College (2001–2007), Macalester College (2007–2009) University of Virginia (2009–2010) and the University of Minnesota (2010–2012). Lavie was the recipient of residential fellowships at the Rockefeller Foundation in Bellagio (1993), Stanford Humanities Center (1993–1994) Institute for Advanced Study, University of Minnesota (2010–2011), Cento Incontri Umani Ascona (2011), the University College Cork (2010–2016), the Center for Middle Eastern Studies, University of California, Berkeley (2013–2014), the Beatrice Bain Research Group, University of California, Berkeley (2012–2016), the Simon and Riva Spatz Visiting Chair in Jewish Studies, Dalhousie University (2018/2019), the Department of Ethnic Studies, University of California, Berkeley (2016–2020), and the Institute of Asian and Transcultural Studies, Vilnius University (2017, 2018, 2022).

== Recognition ==
Lavie authored The Poetics of Military Occupation (UC Press, 1990), receiving the 1990 honorable mention of the Victor Turner Award for Ethnographic Writing, and Wrapped in the Flag of Israel: Mizrahi Single Mothers and Bureaucratic Torture (Berghahn Books 2014, University of Nebraska Press 2018) receiving the 2015 honorable mention of the Association of Middle East Women's Studies Book Award Competition. Wrapped in the Flag of Israel's first edition was also one of the four finalists in the 2015 Clifford Geertz Book Award Competition of the Society for the Anthropology of Religion. Lavie won the American Studies Association's 2009 Gloria Anzaldúa Prize for her article, "Staying Put: Crossing the Palestine-Israel Border with Gloria Anzaldúa", published in Anthropology and Humanism (2011). In 2013, she won the "Heart at East" Honor Plaque for lifetime service to Mizraḥi communities in Israel-Palestine. Her 2019 article "Gaza 2014 and Mizrahi Feminism" was awarded certificates as a top downloaded paper for 2018 to 2022, 2020, and 2021 to 2022 by Wiley Publishing. In 2022, she was elected a senior Fulbright scholar at the Institute of Asian and Transcultural Studies at Vilnius University in Lithuania.

== Activism ==
Lavie is a member of many political, feminist and anti-racist organizations. In 2013, she won the "Heart at East" Honor Plaque for committed excellence and lifetime service to the Mizrahi communities of Israel, given by a coalition of twenty NGOs working for equal distribution of cultural funds in Israel.

Lavie was co-founder and a member of CAFIOT (the Berkeley Committee for Academic Freedom in the Israeli Occupied Territories) from 1982 to 1989.

Lavie is co-signatory to the 1993 Bellagio Declaration for the protection collective indigenous and exilic cultural heritage as intellectual property.

Lavie has served a number of roles at Ahoti, Israel's feminists of color movement. From January 2003 to January 2005, she served on the board of directors. From 2002 to 2003, she both served as the liaison to the New Israel Fund and was a member of the newsletter's editorial collective. From 2003 to 2004, she was the liaison to the FFIPP (Educational Network for Human Rights in Palestine/Israel).

Lavie co-founded the Coalition of Women for Mothers and Children and served as co-director of this coalition of many NGOs from 2003 to 2006.

Lavie has been a member of the Mizrahi Democratic Rainbow Coalition (MDR) since 2002. She served on the Culture Committee from 2002 to 2004, the Committee on Education and the Core Curriculum from 2002 to 2003, and was the MDR Representative to the Coalition of NGOs against Racism from 2005 to 2007.

Lavie has been an Advisory Board Member of Israel's Women's Parliament since 2002.

Lavie co-founded the Mizrahi-Palestinian Coalition Against Apartheid in Israeli Anthropology (CAAIA) and was a member from 2002 to 2008.

Lavie is a member of Jewish Voice for Peace.

== Select publications ==
=== Books ===
- The Poetics of Military Occupation: Mzeina Allegories of Bedouin Identity Under Israeli and Egyptian Rule. Los Angeles: University of California Press. 1991. ISBN 0-520-07552-8.
  - Honorable mention for the Victor Turner Award for Ethnographic Writing.
- Creativity/Anthropology. With Kirin Narayan and Renato Rosaldo. Ithaca: Cornell University Press, 1993. ISBN 978-0-8014-9542-7
- Displacement, Diaspora, and Geographies of Identity. With Ted Swedenburg. Durham: Duke University Press, 1996. ISBN 0-8223-1720-6
- Wrapped in the Flag of Israel: Mizrahi Single Mothers and Bureaucratic Torture. New York: Berghahn Books, 2014. ISBN 978-1-78238-222-5
  - In 2018, the University of Nebraska Press published a revised paperback edition with an expanded afterword discussing the relationship between Mizrahi feminism and Israel-Gaza wars as part of its Expanding Frontiers: Interdisciplinary Approaches to Studies of Women, Gender and Sexuality series. ISBN 978-1-4962-0554-4
  - Wrapped in the Flag of Israel received the 2015 Honorable Mention of the Association of Middle East Women's Studies Book Award competition. It was also a finalist for the 2015 Clifford Geertz Book Award competition by the Society for the Anthropology of Religion.

=== Selected articles ===
- Lavie, Smadar; Young, William C. (1984). "Bedouin in Limbo: Egyptian and Israeli Development Policies in Southern Sinai". Antipode. 16 (2): 33–44. Bibcode:1984Antip..16...33L. doi:10.1111/j.1467-8330.1984.tb00661.x.
- "When Leadership Becomes Allegory: Mzeina Sheikhs and the Experience of Military Occupation". Cultural Anthropology. 4 (2): 99–136. 1989. doi:10.1525/can.1989.4.2.02a00010.
- "Blow-Ups in the Borderzones Third World Israeli Authors Gropings for Home". New Formations. 18: 84–106. January 1992.
- Lavie, Smadar; Hajj A.; Rouse, Forest (1993). "Notes on the Fantastic Journey of the Hajj his Anthropologist and her American Passport". American Ethnologist. 20 (2): 363–384.
- Lavie, Smadar; Swedenburg, Ted (1996). "Between and among the boundaries of culture: Bridging text and lived experience in the third timespace". Cultural Studies. 10: 154–179. doi:10.1080/09502389600490501.
- "Mizrahi Feminism and the Question of Palestine". Journal of Middle East Women's Studies. 7 (2): 56–88. 2011. doi:10.2979/jmiddeastwomstud.7.2.56. S2CID 145667897.
- "Staying Put Crossing the Israel-Palestine Border with Gloria Anzaldua". Anthropology and Humanism Quarterly. 36 (1): 101–121. 2011.
  - Winner of the Gloria Anzaldúa Award, the Women's Committee of the American Studies Association.
- "The Knafo Chronicles". Affilia: Journal of Women and Social Work. 27 (3): 300–315. 2012. doi:10.1177/0886109912443958. S2CID 146866104.
- "Writing against identity politics: An essay on gender, race, and bureaucratic pain". American Ethnologist. 39 (4): 779–803. 2012. doi:10.1111/j.1548-1425.2012.01395.x.
- "Gaza 2014 and Mizraḥi Feminism". PoLAR: Political and Legal Anthropology Review. 42: 85–109. January 2019. doi:10.1111/plar.12284. S2CID 150473862.
- "Confession and Mirage: Professor Mas'uda and the Ashkenazim-for-Palestine in Israel's Academe". Journal of Academic Freedom. 12. 2021.
- "Presence and Absence in Enemies, a Love Story: An Essay on Familism, Traditionalism and Ultranationalism". Palestine/Israel Review. 1 (2). 2024-06-26.

=== Selected chapters ===
- Lavie, Smadar (1995). "Border Poets: Translating by Dialogue". In Ruth Behar; Deborah A. Gordon (eds.). Women Writing Culture. Berkeley: University of California Press. pp. 412–427.
- Lavie, Smadar (2007). "Imperialism and Colonialism: Zionism". Encyclopedia of Women in Islamic Cultures. Vol. 6. Leiden: Brill. pp. 9–15.
- Santos, Adrianna M.; Urquijo-Ruiz, Rita E; Cantu, Norma E, eds. (2022). "Who Can Publish Autohistoria-Teoria with the Anger It Deserves?: Unclassified Lloronas and the Academic Text". El Mundo Zurdo 8: Selected Works from the 2019 Meeting of the Society for the Study of Gloria Anzaldua. San Francisco: Aunt Lute Books. pp. 151–168.

=== Selected public anthropology articles ===
- "Arrival of the New cultured Tenants: Soviet Immigration to Israel and the Displacing of the Sephardi Jews". Times Literary Supplement. 4602: 11. June 14, 1991.
- "Lily White Feminism and Academic Apartheid in Israel Anthropological Perspectives". Anthropology News: 10–11. October 2003. doi:10.1111/an.2003.44.7.10.
- 2005 "Israeli Anthropology and American Anthropology". Anthropology Newsletter January Issue. P. 8.
- "Rachel Gamliel: A Palestinian-Jew from Jerusalem". Beirut Independent Media Center. December 2005.
- 2006 "Operations 'Summer Rains' and 'Adequate Pay' — Yet Other Acts in the Mizrahi-Palestinian Tragedy". Co-authored with Reuven Abarjel, co-founder of Israel's Black Panthers. Counter Currents.
- 2006 "On the Progress of Affirmative Action and Cultural Rights for Marginalized Communities in Israel". Co-authored with Rafi Shubeli. Anthropology Newsletter. November. pp. 6–7.
- 2007 "Dry Twigs". The Electronic Intifada. 3 August.
- 2009 "Sacrificing Gaza to Revive Israel's Labor Party". Counter Currents.19 January.
- 2015 "Smadar Lavie, Wrapped in the Flag of Israel: Mizrahi Single Mothers and Bureaucratic Torture, 1st Edition (New Texts Out Now)". Jadaliyya. 18 February.
- 2015 "Revisiting Israeli Anthropology and American Anthropology: Our "Special Relations". Allegra Lab Anthropology Blog. 27 October.
- 2020 "Smadar Lavie, Wrapped in the Flag of Israel: Mizrahi Single Mothers and Bureaucratic Torture, Revised Edition with a New Afterword by the Author". Jadaliyya. 16 January.

=== Selected video lectures ===
- 2004 "Cultural Property Rights and the Racial Construction of the Mizrahi as a Trade-Mark: Notes on the Revolving Door of Israel's Academe-Regime". Presented in a conference, "The New IP Order", in a 4-participant panel on "Culture and Copyright". Haifa University. 14 June.
- 2015 "Wrapped in the Flag of Israel: Mizrahi Single Mothers and Bureaucratic Torture". Brown University, Watson Institute for International and Public Affairs and the Center for Middle Eastern Studies. 20 October.
- 2018 "Ahoti (=Sistah): Portraits of Mizrahi Feminists #1". Noemie Serfaty short video, San Francisco. 17 December.
- 2020 "The Zionist Movement and Mizrahi Women: Right Wing Feminism of Color in the State of Israel". Pandemic Webinar with Jewish Voice for Peace Bay Area. 26 July
