= Women Writing Culture =

- Editors: Ruth Behar; Deborah A. Gordon
- Language: English
- Subject: Social studies Women's studies Gender studies
- Genre: Non-fiction
- Publisher: University of California Press
- Publication date: 1995
- Publication place: United States
- Media type: Print
- Pages: 457 pages
- ISBN: 0520202082

Women Writing Culture is a 1995 book on the role of women in anthropology, the practice of ethnographic writing, feminist anthropology, and the gender and racial politics of the canon of recognized works in anthropology. Edited by Ruth Behar and Deborah Gordon, the book collects work from female anthropologists such as Louise Lamphere, Faye V. Harrison, Lila Abu-Lughod, Catherine Lutz, Kirin Narayan, Aihwa Ong, and Anna Tsing. Women Writing Culture has been cited as part of anthropology's "literary turn" and is stated by Keridwen Luis to highlight the longstanding involvement of female ethnographers in self-reflective, experimental, collaborative and literary forms of anthropological writing, and propose "the creation of a feminist canon" in anthropology. The project emerged as a counterpoint to Writing Culture, a 1986 anthology that was a key text in the literary turn.

== Content ==
Essays within the book highlight the work of ethnographic work of Elsie Clews Parsons, Ruth Benedict, Margaret Mead, Ella Deloria, and Zora Neale Hurston, which Behar calls a "women's literary tradition within anthropology." The authors of Women Writing Culture criticized a masculinized approach in anthropological scholarship, the exclusion of women from academia and the silencing of their authorial voices. It brought a feminist perspective to anthropological theory, teaching of the history of the discipline, and the practice of ethnographic observation and writing. The book also incorporated critiques within feminism to address the marginalization and oppression of women of color and lesbians. In the book's introduction Behar also states that the works of women are questioned in many ways and are not taken seriously and that the book is a product of a "double crisis": the crisis of anthropology and the crisis of feminism. She also states that one of the main goals was to “decolonize the power relations inherent in the representation to the Other”.

The authors argue that poetry and arts are necessary to express themselves, and to denounce the ravages that colonialism made into their lives. As junior faculty, mothers, wives, untenured, graduate students, first generation scholars, argue that they have in their minds an awakening for the history of anthropology, and as their individual trajectories, their contributions are diverse, and are seeking for an "anthropology without exiles." The book also responds to the feminist crisis represented in the book This Bridge Called my Back by Cherrie Moraga and Gloria Anzaldua which at the beginning was a project coming from outside of academy, when the both authors did not have tenure and struggled to survive in hard living conditions.

This book is compounded by 4 major sections:

- Part I: Beyond Self and Other
- Part II: Another History, another canon
- Part III: Does anthropology have a sex?
- Part IV: Traveling Feminists

== Development ==
Women Writing Culture took three forms: a 1991 seminar at the University of Michigan, a 1993 special issue of the journal Critique of Anthropology, and the 1995 book. These were organized, in part, in response to the 1986 book Writing Culture: The Poetics and Politics of Ethnography, edited by James Clifford and George E. Marcus. Writing Culture, which is a series of essays, presents epistemological debates about which and how are the proper ways of conducting research, beginning with the search of what was described as so-called “objectivity”, the search and the construction of the authorial voice, the need for reflexivity during the process of research. Writing Culture applied a literary critique to prior anthropological writing, and called for new literary techniques to be applied to ethnography. Women Writing Culture was intended to offer a critique of both this book and the proclaimed novelty of approaches by arguing that both are symptoms of the exclusion of works by women from the mainstream of anthropological scholarship.

Behar intended the book to raise awareness about the marginalization of the exclusion of the female contributors' works. She stated that the book was "multivoiced, and includes biographical, historical, and literary essays, fiction, autobiography, theater, poetry, life stories, travelogues, social criticism, fieldwork accounts, and blended texts of various kinds." She further asserted that the only woman contributor for Writing Culture was Marie Louis Pratt, who was not an anthropologist but a literary critic, pointing out that the absence of women voices in the book was due to the lack of value given to women's anthropological production, which was often seen as less professional than men's.

== Reception ==
Since its release Women Writing Culture has been cited as an example of how "feminist concern with the production and representation of knowledge provides an especially appropriate platform from which to question conventional styles of writing and representing."

The book has received reviews from American Ethnologist, the NWSA Journal, and American Anthropologist, among others.
