= Feminist anthropology =

Subdiscipline of anthropology

Feminist anthropology is a four-field approach to anthropology (archeological, biological, cultural, linguistic) that seeks to transform research findings, anthropological hiring practices, and the scholarly production of knowledge, using insights from feminist theory. Simultaneously, feminist anthropology challenges essentialist feminist theories developed in Europe and America. While feminists practiced cultural anthropology since its inception (see Margaret Mead and Hortense Powdermaker), it was not until the 1970s that feminist anthropology was formally recognized as a subdiscipline of anthropology. Since then, it has developed its own subsection of the American Anthropological Association – the Association for Feminist Anthropology – and its own publication, Feminist Anthropology. Their former journal Voices is now defunct.

== History ==
Feminist anthropology has unfolded through three historical phases beginning in the 1970s: the anthropology of women, the anthropology of gender, and finally feminist anthropology.

Prior to these historical phases, feminist anthropologists trace their genealogy to the late 19th century. Erminnie Platt Smith, Alice Cunningham Fletcher, Matilda Coxe Stevenson, Frances Densmore—many of these women were self-taught anthropologists and their accomplishments faded and heritage erased by the professionalization of the discipline at the turn of the 20th century. Prominent among early women anthropologists were the wives of 'professional' men anthropologists, some of whom facilitated their husbands research as translators and transcriptionists. Margery Wolf, for example, wrote her classic ethnography "The House of Lim" from experiences she encountered following her husband to northern Taiwan during his own fieldwork.

While anthropologists like Margaret Mead and Ruth Benedict are representatives of the history of feminist anthropology, female anthropologists of color and varying ethnicities also play a role in the theoretical concepts of the field. Hortense Powdermaker, for example, a contemporary of Mead's who studied with British anthropological pioneer Bronislaw Malinowski conducted political research projects in a number of then a-typical settings: reproduction and women in Melanesia (Powdermaker 1933), race in the American South (Powdermaker 1939), gender and production in Hollywood (1950), and class-gender-race intersectionality in the African Copper Belt (Powdermaker 1962). Similarly, Zora Neale Hurston, a student of Franz Boas, the father of American anthropology, experimented with narrative forms beyond the objective ethnography that characterized the proto/pseudo-scientific writings of the time. Other African American women made similar moves at the junctions of ethnography and creativity, namely Katherine Dunham and Pearl Primus, both of whom studied dance in the 1940s. Also important to the later spread of feminist anthropology within other subfields beyond cultural anthropology was physical anthropologist Caroline Bond Day and archeologist Mary Leakey.

The anthropology of women, introduced through Peggy Golde's "Women in the Field" and Michelle Rosaldo and Louise Lamphere's edited volume Woman, Culture, and Society, attempted to recuperate women as distinct cultural actors otherwise erased by male anthropologists' focus on men's lives as the universal character of a society. Male anthropologists, Golde argued specifically, rarely have access to women in tribes and societies because of the sexual threat they pose to these women. As such, they receive the stories of men about women in instances when women are not present at all. The male anthropologists' ignorance and the indigenous men's domination congeal to create instances where, according to Rosaldo and Lamphere, the asymmetry between women and men become universal. The second anthropology of women would arise out of American engagements with Friedrich Engels' The Origin of the Family, Private Property and the State, arguing that this universal asymmetry was not timeless, but a product of capitalist relations that came to dominate the global mode of production through colonialism. As both approaches grew more vocal in their critique of male ethnographers' descriptions as one-sided, an 'add women and mix' approach to ethnography became popular, whereby women were not necessarily described at detail, but mentioned as part of the wider culture.

In the wake of Gayle Rubin and her critique of "the sex/gender system", the anthropology of women transformed into anthropology of gender. Gender was a set of meanings and relationships related to, but not isomorphic, with biological sex. Women was not a universal community or category that was self-evident. Following the rise of women of color feminism, the anthropology of gender critiqued the early goals of first-wave feminists and anthropologists as overly concerned with bourgeois social ambitions. It did so through a move from documenting the experience of women as a universal population to interpreting the place of gender in broader patterns of meaning, interaction, and power. This includes the work of women anthropologists Henrietta Moore and Ethel Albert. Moore contended that anthropology, even when carried out by women, tended to "[order] the world into a male idiom ... because researchers are either men or women trained in a male-oriented discipline". Anthropology's theoretical architecture and practical methods, Moore argued, were so overwhelmingly influenced by sexist ideology (anthropology was commonly termed the "study of man" for much of the twentieth century) that without serious self-examination and a conscious effort to counter this bias, anthropology could not meaningfully represent female experience.

Today, feminist anthropology has grown out of the anthropology of gender to encompass the study of the female body as it intersects with or is acted upon by cultural, medical, economic, and other forces. This includes the expansion of feminist politics beyond cultural anthropology to physical anthropology, linguistic anthropology, and archeology, as well as feminist anthropology becoming a site for connecting cultural studies, history, literature, and ethnic studies.

== Feminist archaeology ==
Feminist archaeology initially emerged in the late 1970s and early 80s, along with other objections to the epistemology espoused by the processual school of archaeological thought, such as symbolic and hermeneutic archaeologies. Margaret Conkey and Janet Spector's 1984 paper Archaeology and the Study of Gender summed up the feminist critique of the discipline at that time: that archaeologists were unproblematically overlaying modern-day, Western gender norms onto past societies; for example in the sexual division of labor; that contexts and artifacts attributed to the activities of men, such as projectile point production and butchering at kill sites, were prioritized in research time and funding; and that the very character of the discipline was constructed around masculine values and norms. For example, women were generally encouraged to pursue laboratory studies instead of fieldwork (although there were exceptions throughout the history of the discipline) and the image of the archaeologist was centered around the rugged, masculine, "cowboy of science".

Recently, feminists in archeology have started to confront the issue of sexual assault during "field work" through scholarly research on the social life of archeologists. The Biological Anthropology Field Experiences Web Survey, open to bioarcheologists, primatologists, and other subfields, revealed that 19% of women are sexually assaulted during fieldwork, with 59% of anthropologists—male and female—experiencing sexual harassment.

== Feminist cultural anthropology ==
Feminist cultural anthropology deals with the concept of feminism through the lens of cultural anthropology. When combining these two fields of study, cultural anthropology can be approached in a non-binary way. New information pertaining to research and knowledge from a scholarly perspective also has no restrictions. This field of study may impact feminism and women and gender studies as well because it provides feminist analyses of culture from an anthropological perspective.

In the 1970s, women started attending undergraduate and graduate universities where the social sciences, which were at one time largely dominated by men, were now being practiced by men and women alike. With more women in the social science disciplines, they started having an impact on how some issues were being dealt with in the social science fields, such as the emphasis on gender studies and the integration of women's rights issues into these studies. Women entering the social science fields had such a large impact on the feminist anthropology movement because before the 1980s, female anthropologists mostly focused on aspects such as family, marriage, and kinship. Many female anthropologists reacted to this stereotype placed on them, as they wanted to focus on broader aspects of culture in the scholarly community.

When feminist anthropology first developed, it was intended to be the subdiscipline of the anthropology of women. However, feminist cultural anthropology arose as a subfield itself when anthropologists started to realize that women's and gender studies weren't published as frequently as other topics in anthropology. As feminist anthropology began being practiced by more people and cultural aspects such as race, values, and customs started being considered, focuses on personal identity and differences between people in varying cultures became the main idea surrounding feminist cultural anthropology. With this advance, female anthropologists started focusing on all aspects of gender and sex and how they vary culturally. With a focus on feminism through an anthropological lens, women's role in society and their contributions to the social sciences formed itself a new subfield known as feminist cultural anthropology.

According to The Gender/Sexuality Reader, modern anthropologists removed the father from the family without changing the basic social science concept of the family. The function of the family is child rearing, which is mapped onto a bounded set of people who share a place and love one another. Feminist anthropologists have found it difficult to apply the normal concept of family put forward by modern anthropologists as not all families display the same associated features. One of the major problems that can arise is anthropologists often fail to provide what many feminist scholars are looking for in their work; the evidence of links and similarities through which to develop a politics of solidarity and connection. From the feminist perspective, the political implications of moral relativism are potentially reactionary, as they preclude the definition of either oppression or liberation. Another aspect in this field is the reproduction politics. It is an area of contemporary convergence between feminism and anthropology, the body, and the concept of embodiment. The reason for the shift in focus is the relationship between gender and sex. Bodies often contain both female and male substances. Men and women are distinguished by their genital classes, the gender of these men and women depends on their bodily state in relation to the gendered substance, and is more related to age and reproductive history. Some anthropologists have argued that the basic family unit is the mother and her children; whether a mate becomes attached or not is a variable matter.

=== Complex subjectivity ===
Subjectivity has become an increasing focal point for both feminist scholars and anthropologists, as the notion of the subject has been becoming the center of more and more social theories. This new shared interest between these two groups has been posited by Stevi Jackson as the reason for the new partnership between feminists and anthropologists, as "Complex Subjectivity is relational and these relations provide the possibilities for both similarity and difference to emerge." Others argue that in order to move forward society there must be more focus on relationships of both similarity and difference, as produce in western theoretical practice and people's daily lives. Hybridity is considered by Jackson to be an important point within complex subjectivity, as it "is the mixing that brings forth new forms from previously identified categories".

Anthropologist and feminist scholars have started to integrate the notion of the subject at the center of social theories, which Jackson states is complex because it discusses a notion of subjectivity that signifies society is moving away from what can be appropriately called the objective truth. This new idea of complex subjectivity is relational and these relations can provide the possibilities for similarities and differences to emerge.

== Feminist linguistic anthropology ==
In Henrietta Moore's work "Feminism and Anthropology", she discusses the implications that the "male bias" has on the study of feminist anthropology, more specially how it impacts linguistic anthropology. According to Moore, in Western culture, the use of the male pronoun as a way to address both the entirety of society, aka mankind, and to address both male and females is an example of how anthropology is male-oriented. Moore concludes that the overuse of the male pronoun to generalize all of society is a result of the male-bias being "society's view".

Studies have also concluded that the way and mechanisms in which males and females talk are different. Studies have found that females, when compared to males of similar social classes, choose to speak in a more formal and "correct" way. Females have also been observed to initiate conversations between couples more frequently than males and also ask questions during conversation more frequently.

The structure of human language has also been impacted by sex differences. Women are often defined within the spectra of "belonging" to men, such as Miss/Mrs. or using their husband's last name. There are also 220 terms to define sexual deviance in women, but 22 terms to define male sexual deviance.

== Relationship with feminism ==
The relationships of feminist anthropology with other strands of academic feminism are uneasy. By concerning themselves with the different ways in which different cultures constitute gender, feminist anthropology can contend that the oppression of women is not universal. Henrietta Moore argued that the concept of "woman" is insufficiently universal to stand as an analytical category in anthropological inquiry: that the idea of 'woman' was specific to certain cultures, and not a human universal. For some feminists, anthropologist Michelle Rosaldo wrote, this argument contradicted a core principle of their understanding of relations between men and women. Contemporary feminist anthropologist Marilyn Strathern argues that anthropology, which must deal with difference rather than seeking to erase it, is not necessarily harmed by this disagreement, but notes nonetheless that feminist anthropology faces resistance.

Anthropology engages often with feminists from non-Western traditions, whose perspectives and experiences can differ from those of white European and American feminists. Historically, such 'peripheral' perspectives have sometimes been marginalized and regarded as less valid or important than knowledge from the western world. Feminist anthropologists have claimed that their research helps to correct this systematic bias in mainstream feminist theory. On the other hand, anthropologists' claims to include and engage with such other perspectives have in turn been criticized - local people are seen as the producers of local knowledge, which only the western anthropologist can convert into social science theory. Because feminist theorists come predominantly from the west, and do not emerge from the cultures they study (some of which have their own distinct traditions of feminism, like the grassroots feminism of Latin America), their ideas about feminism may contain western-specific assumptions that do not apply simply to the cultures they investigate. Rosaldo criticizes the tendency of feminists to treat other contemporary cultures as anachronistic, to see other parts of the world as representing other periods in western history - to say, for example, that gender relations in one country are somehow stuck at a past historical stage of those in another. Western feminists had, Rosaldo said, viewed women elsewhere as "ourselves undressed and the historical specificity of their lives and of our own becomes obscured". Anthropology, Moore argued, by speaking about and not for women, could overcome this bias.

Marilyn Strathern characterized the sometimes antagonistic relationship between feminism and anthropology as self-sustaining, since "each so nearly achieves what the other aims for as an ideal relationship with the world". Feminism constantly poses a challenge to the androcentric orthodoxy from which anthropology emerges; anthropology undermines the ethnocentricism of feminism.

== The "double difference" ==
Feminist anthropology, Rayna Rapp argues, is subject to a 'double difference' from mainstream academia. It is a feminist tradition – part of a branch of scholarship, sometimes marginalized as an offshoot of postmodernism and deconstructionism and concerned with the experiences of women – who are marginalized by an androcentric orthodoxy [citation needed]. At the same time it addresses non-Western experience and concepts, areas of knowledge deemed peripheral to the knowledge created in the west. It is thus doubly marginalized.

Moore argues that some of this marginalization is self-perpetuating. By insisting on adhering exclusively to the 'female point of view', feminist anthropology constantly defines itself as 'not male' and therefore as inevitably distinct from, and marginal to, mainstream anthropology. Feminist anthropology, Moore says, effectively ghettoizes itself. Strathern argues that feminist anthropology, as a tradition posing a challenge to the mainstream, can never fully integrate with that mainstream: it exists to critique, to deconstruct, and to challenge.

== See also ==
- Feminist sociology
- Edwin Ardener
- Louise Lamphere
- Catherine Lutz
- Phyllis Kaberry
- Emily Martin
- Henrietta Moore
- Sherry Ortner
- Michelle Rosaldo
- Gayle Rubin
- Sandra Morgen
