= Mari Luz Esteban Galarza =

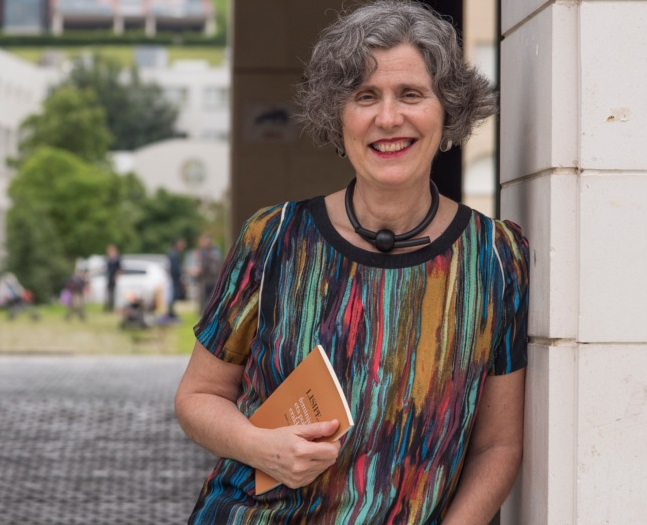
- in 2017
- Born: 1 November 1959 (age 66)
- Education: University of the Basque Country (UPV / EHU); University of Barcelona
- Employer: University of the Basque Country (UPV/EHU).

Mari Luz Esteban Galarza (born 1 November 1959 Pedrosa de Valdeporres) is a Basque anthropologist. She earned her degree in medicine and surgery from the University of the Basque Country (UPV / EHU) in 1983 and in 1993 she received her doctorate in cultural anthropology from the University of Barcelona.

== Life ==
She graduated in medicine, and worked in Biscay (Basauri and Bilbao) as a family planning physician, from 1984 to 1996.

After completing her doctorate, she taught Social Anthropology, initially at the University of León, from 1994 to 1996, then at the Public University of Navarra from 1996 to 1998. Since 1998, she has been a professor at the University of the Basque Country (UPV/EHU).

She was a member of the Assembly of Women of Bizkaia and the Platform for a Basque Public System of Care for Dependency. Today she is part of the Women's Group of Basauri (Bizkaia) to which she has belonged since her university years and of Marienea Elkartea (Women's House of Basauri).

Her doctoral thesis, in the field of reproductive health and gender, focused on the study of women's experience of their own health and the experience of family planning centers, an area in which she has several publications. After this research, she developed a new theoretical-methodological perspective, anthropology of the body, whose most important publication is the book Anthropology of the body. Gender, body itineraries, identity and change. Later she has delved into the field of emotions and love, having published, among other things, Critique of Loving Thought.

Her research focuses on the field of Anthropology of Medicine, Feminist Anthropology and the Anthropology of the Body and Emotions.

She has also written a book of poetry: Amaren heriotzak libreago egin ninduen, translated into Catalan: La mort de la meva mare em va fer lés lliure and into Spanish: La muerte de mi madre me hizo me más libre.

Also an essay on the transformations in politics, in general, and in feminist politics, in particular, based on her experience in the Basque region: Feminismoa eta politikaren eraldaketak.

== Works ==
- Galarza, Mari Luz Esteban (2003). "El Género como categoría analítica: Revisiones y aplicaciones a la salud". Cuadernos de Psiquiatría comunitaria (in Spanish). 3 (1). Asociación Asturiana de Neuropsiquiatría y Salud Mental: 22–39. ISSN 1578-9594.
- Granada, Universidad de; Galarza, Esteban; Luz, María; Rivero, Távora (2008). "El amor romántico y la subordinación social de las mujeres: revisiones y propuestas". Universitat de Barcelona. Facultad de Psicología. ISSN 0066-5126.
- Granada, Universidad de; Galarza, Esteban; Luz, María; Domenech, Medina; Rivero, Távora (2005). "¿ Por qué analizar el amor? Nuevas posibilidades para el estudio de las desigualdades de género". DIGIBUG Home.
- Galarza, Mari Luz Esteban (2015). "La reformulación de la política, el activismo y la etnografía: Esbozo de una antropología somática y vulnerable". Ankulegi: Gizarte antropologia aldizkaria = Revista de antropología social (in Spanish) (19). Ankulegi: 75–93. ISSN 1138-347X.
