= Bellagio =

Bellagio may refer to:

- 79271 Bellagio, a main-belt asteroid
- Bellagio (resort), a luxury resort and casino in Nevada, United States
- Bellagio (Hong Kong), a private housing building
- Bellagio, Lombardy, an Italian town near Canzo
- Bellagio Center, a conference centre and artists' residency location in Bellagio, Italy
- Bellagio declaration, an intellectual copyright resolution
