= Color Blindness, Whiteness, and Backlash =

Race and society in the U.S.

Color Blindness is a more contemporary form of ahistorical racism that is epitomized by the phrase, "I do not see color." In essence the term refers to one who places racism squarely in the past.

Whiteness is a vague racial-socio-economic category that has shifted definition over time. In the early-mid 20th century the category of whiteness was expanded to include people of Irish, Slavic, Greek, Jewish, and various other backgrounds which had previously been excluded from the category. This shift has been attributed to individuals within these categories attaining middle class status. This gives whiteness an economic aspect in addition to the ethnic and racial aspects.

Backlash is a term used to describe the phenomenon of resistance to, or counter-movements against, movements of equality. Backlash can come in many different forms such as overt, bigoted, and violent resistance to progress, such as the K.K.K, or institutional regression such as mass incarceration as backlash to the movement towards racial equality in the 1960s. Color blindness is deployed as backlash to modern racial equality moments by claiming that race and racism no longer have a role in modern socio-economic inequality.

== Color Blindness, Whiteness, and the Creation of Backlash-Kensie ==
The modern day conception of race is surprisingly not much different than it was at the time of colonialism; many still perceive race as biological, and contribute human differences to this myth. In the discussion of what is meant by racial groups, “the consensus among most scholars in fields such as evolutionary biology, anthropology, and other disciplines is that racial distinctions fail on all three counts—that is, they are not genetically discrete, are not reliably measured, and are not scientifically meaningful”. While science has failed to reveal what defines racial groups, anthropology and history have offered meaningful insight in the discussion of race. This already reveals the subjective nature of race, and alludes to the problematic consequences that always arise with subjectivity. Race can better be understood by looking at the social and historical context that allowed for its construction.

=== Renato Rosaldo and Cultural Invisibility ===
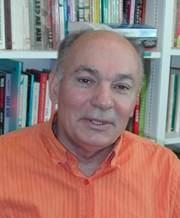
American author, poet, and anthropologist Renato Rosaldo

While “no domain of life is more or less cultural than any other,” humans have become accustomed to differentiating their own culture from others. Renato Rosaldo explains the all too common narrative of cultural invisibility, or how we tend to see ourselves as the norm and therefore, render our unique culture invisible. Naturally, this emphasizes the culture of others and unfortunately, creates this idea that they themselves are in fact the “other.” One begins to feel like a detached observer, making it far too easy to develop a superiority complex for themselves and their culture. While this ethnocentric perspective arose centuries ago with the rise of eurocentrism, it still persists today. Rosaldo argues that “in the pseudo revolutionary ladder, people begin without culture and grow increasingly cultured until they reach that point where they become post cultural and therefore transparent to ‘us’”. This ladder is unchanging and is linked to “tactic notions of social mobility”. It has created and reproduced a linear hierarchy throughout history that persists today, whether it is intentional or unintentional, realized or not realized.

=== Pamela Perry and Ethnicity ===
Pamela Perry analyzes the narrative that we are all equally cultural, yet whites are understood as “cultureless.” To better understand this notion, she went to two high schools in California; one being predominantly white and the other being racially diverse. She questioned one white, middle class girl from the predominantly white school on what white American culture looks like, for the student to answer: “I wouldn't be able to tell you. I don't know”. While the white students at each school existed in different environments in terms of diversity, they all “defined white as cultureless”. Perry discovered that these students were able to come to the same consensus due to two processes. Those who go to the predominantly white school “define themselves and other whites as people without culture due to the process of naturalization—the embedding of historically constituted cultural practices in that which is taken for granted and seems ‘normal’ and natural.” This same attitude was achieved at the racially diverse school “through the process of rationalization—the embedding of whiteness within a Western rational epistemology and value paradigm that marginalizes or subordinates all things ‘cultural’”. While some see white as normative due to a historical sense of privilege, and others see white as normative by marginalizing the “other,” both perspectives have proven to be quite damaging to our society as they play into the power hierarchy.

=== White Universality ===
This construction of whiteness deems white as the universal human and everyone else as the ethnic other. This notion of cultural invisibility has not only constructed the framework of white as the invisible, but it has also allowed for the privilege that comes with it to be rendered invisible as well. When white privilege is taken for granted, a white person can ignore the power imbalances that exist all around them. A white person does not have to worry about being pulled over and interrogated by a cop while a black person might fear for their life the second that the red and blue lights turn on. It is dangerous for race to be unmarked like it is in the case of whiteness. It allows society to ignore the power imbalances that revolve around the social construction of whiteness, and ignore our history of white domination. Perry argues that “to more effectively dismantle white domination, we need to be aware of and ready to work with its different manifestations and internal contradictions”. We must no longer deny the fact that there is a white culture because this “post cultural or even anticultural” viewpoint allows for the existence of the idea that white people are beyond and more rational than their peers. This social construction situates white people in a category by themselves at the top of the social hierarchy. It is a privilege for a white person to be able to be color blind, but it is this privilege that creates disadvantages for others.

== Whiteness, Colorblindness, Slavery, and History-Eli ==
As outlined above, the category of whiteness is somewhat arbitrary. In Matthew Frye Jacobson's The Fabrication of Race, the example of how in contemporary America a white woman can have black children but a black woman cannot have white children, is illustrative of how whiteness is a category more vaguely defined by exclusion rather than an academically useful taxonomy.

Colonialism is the practice of one nation or state exhibiting control, either militarily or economically, over another area or group of people.

=== White Ethnicity ===
Because whiteness is vaguely defined, often times whites in America will pick up other ethnic labels they have genetic, not necessarily cultural ties to, in order to "play the white ethnic card." This is often combined with colorblind rhetoric in order to argue that racism existed squarely in the past and claim that every ethnicity has had hardship in the past, so therefore there should not be any more movement towards racial equality.

=== Slavery in the United States ===
The colorblind view is flawed because of the history, of slavery and racial discrimination in the United States. The concept of race evolved alongside the institution of slavery, causing the two to be intrinsically linked as racism became the ideological justification for slavery. The ideology of racism put in place to justify slavery put whites at the top and blacks at the bottom of a biological hierarchy. This normalized the institution of slavery by framing the economic exploitation of black bodies as natural and, ultimately, good for blacks.

=== Historical Oppression ===
In Audrey Smedley's Race in North America the author quotes John Hope Franklin and Alfred Moss who outline black labor in the earliest points in American colonial history.

"Thirty Negros, including Nuflo de Olano, were with Balboa when he discovered the Pacific Ocean, Cortes carried blacks with him into Mexico, and one of them planted and harvested the first wheat crop in the New World. Tow accompanied Velas in 1520. When Alvardo when to Quito, he carried tow hundred with him. They were with Pizarro on his Peruvian expedition and carried him to the Cathedral after he was murdered. The Africans in the expeditions of Almagro and Valdivia saved their Spanish masters from the Indians in 1525.

...

Africans were with the French in their explorations of the New World... When the Great conquest of the Mississippi Valley was undertaken by the French in the seventeenth century, Negroes constituted a substantial portion of the pioneers who settled in the region. Around 1790, Jean Baptiste Point du Sable, a French-speaking black, erected the first building in a place that came to be known as Chicago.

The contributions of Black and Brown individuals and just how much the United States Colonial Project relied on slave labor is not something covered in high school history courses, and efforts to add such information, such as the New York Times' 1619 Project, often receive backlash in the form of colorblindness. Colorblindness is deployed to claim that adding such information into the curriculum would disrupt racial harmony.

== A-Cultural Culture, Whiteness, and Colonialism-Natalie ==
In Renato Rosaldo's article, “Border Crossings”, Rosaldo talks about the uneven power relationships structured by post-cultural (or a-cultural) mindsets of a society. Although it may be unintentional in some cases, power relationships are formed off the privilege of one society compared to another. A post-cultural, or a-cultural, society is a society that establishes their lifestyle as the “norm” and compares all other lifestyles to theirs. Taken from Renato Rosaldo's article, “as the other becomes more culturally visible, the self becomes correspondingly less so.” When we categorize society into sections of “other” and “self”, uneven power relationships are formed.

=== Contemporary Examples ===
For example, in the United States white people are seen as the “norm” and any other person of color may be seen as the “other”. This can be exemplified by cultural fairs, food markets, stores, or any other place or event labeled as cultural. Most of the time in the United States we see stores that have “cultural” foods and those are stores of Mexican, Asian, or Italian descent. This is what predominantly white people categorize as cultural. In the United States, white people see cultural people as less academic and more working class, whereas they see themselves as higher academic achievements and in a higher class. This shows where race and class start to coincide with each other and the concept of the construction of whiteness plays into the power imbalances of social categories. Rosaldo talks about the power relationship at the Mexico-United States border and how white people see Mexican people as a racial minority. These uneven power imbalances are problematic because it creates hierarchies. Many racial minorities are seen as the lesser of society with less access to education, money, and social standing. Whereas white people are seen as the higher part of society with better access to education, better paying jobs and higher social standing. All these hierarchies root back to settler colonialism and white people pushing indigenous peoples out of their homes.

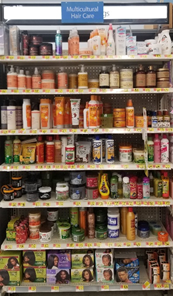
Walmart "multi-cultural" hair care contrasted by a/post-cultural section for white hair.

==== Multicultural Hair Care ====
An example of how white people established their culture as post-cultural is seen through the hair care section in this Walmart. In this Walmart the products that predominantly non-white people would use is labeled as “multicultural”, rather than just placed on the shelf with the other products. In some cases, these products can also be locked, whereas no other products in this section are. This is a way that white people have determined their characteristics as “normal” and others as “different”

=== Settler Colonialism ===
Settler colonialism as defined by Guest is, “displacement and pacification of indigenous people and expropriation of their lands and resources”. This is a kind of origin myth because of the many different perspectives and stories that root back to it. When the settlers came to what is now known as America, they pushed indigenous peoples out of their homes and stole their resources. In American schooling we were told the story of the exploration of the new world and how beneficial it was that they discovered this place. Examples of settler colonialism are known as Thanksgiving, the Boston Tea Party, settling of the West and so on. As time goes on, more perspectives and light are being shed on the stories of the indigenous peoples and the ways that their lives were affected.

==== Indigenous Genocide ====
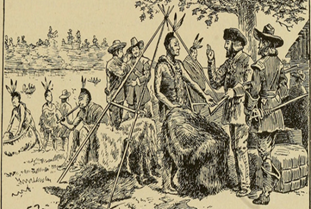
Indigenous Americans trading with European Fur Traders

Settler colonialism elides native indigenous people's cultures through the white washing of colonialism. The native people to this land had an established culture and lifestyle and when the white people came and colonized, they conducted a genocide of native people and therefore established an unequal power relation. Through origin myths told about settler colonialism it makes native people invisible and corrupts the real story of what happened on this land to this day. In present day, the unequal relations of power are seen through housing, jobs and resources given to native people as mentioned before.

== Backlash: Comparing the Past, the Present, and its Significance-Bryn ==
The idea of colorblindness and whiteness all relates to the privilege of white people and those who grew up in a more post-cultural westernized location, where culture is less prevalent compared to more pre-cultural countries. In turn, backlash is created and becomes more prevalent as such ideas are being more noticed and called out on.

=== Smedley and Historical Examples ===
If we look into the past, based on the authors Smedley and Smedley, egocentrism was one of the first beginnings to backlash as it “[has] deep historical roots [. . .]” and was created from the belief of superiority of their culture and lifestyle which led to conflict. In turn, this created backlash as Americans, or more specifically, white people do not technically have a culture and would also place their privilege and sense of superiority onto other minority groups. The idea of race first emerged in the “16th and the 18th centuries” and was merely “a folk idea in the English language." As time progressed through the years however, the idea of race shifted as something standard and uniform and then eventually transformed. By the revolutionary era, it has remained the same concept today as race was “widely used and used as a reference for social categories of Indians, Blacks, and Whites." In the past, not many minority groups had the ability to make an attempt against this conflict as slavery was still widely used aside from some thousands of slaves that were freed and won their freedom from being on both sides of the war for independence. The concept of race itself was changed for categorizing humanity as the leaders of the American colonies had specifically selected African Americans to be permanent slaves for them. At that time, the backlash for White families owning African Americans slaves did not receive any backlash until much later into the American Revolution where the North and the South were divided while thousands of slaves fought for their freedom however they could. As the idea of race was an entirely new concept, colorblindness was not as much of a practice as the fabrication of the new categorization made it more transparent of the different races at the time, separating each of them for easier identification for both positive and negative uses like slavery.

=== Richard Dyer and Contemporary Examples ===
Moving on to today's day and age, much of the dominant political ideologies is that all are created equal and the usage of democracy, civil rights, justice and freedom has it for all races to have more equal opportunities and to not be treated any less than human beings. As for backlash, it has only increased and became more relevant as citizens became more self aware of the concept of race. According to Author Richard Dyer, "white people have had so very much more control over the definition of themselves and indeed of others than have those others." In other words, the usage of westernization has allowed many white people to seem more superior and allow them to have more privilege compared to other groups. The backlash mainly resides with white people believing that all have the same ability and power to move up in the world, like job opportunities or overall positions of power. However, other races and genders actually have to work harder to even reach the potential of making a decent living. As Dyer points out, the "media, politics, and education are still in the hands of white people." With that in mind, other minority groups are fighting for equal opportunity where white people preach about equal chance and yet are also the sources of power and control that keeps such groups from being able to reach that threshold. The backlash of also being under represented is widely known as only recently more diversity is being shown on advertisements like for TV and magazines, along with other entertainment platforms like the acting or sports industry. One reason can be that “white people are systematically privileged in Western society,” enjoying, "unearned advantage and conferred dominance." This statement highlights that while other races have to work hard to be seen or get recognition, white people are still systematically privileged in Western society. The significance of backlash can be a way for people to understand how far Westernization and other countries have come since the first creation and usage of race that separated and categorized people. From the beginning, the concept of race was used to separate minority groups specifically for picking African Americans for slavery, but for today's day and age, it is used to accentuate people's differences in a positive light as there is power in diversity and all cultures can be represented.
