= Nature, Culture and Gender =

1980 book on sociology

- First edition
- Editors: Carol MacCormack and Marilyn Strathern (Eds.)
- Language: English
- Subject: Anthropology, Social and cultural anthropology
- Genre: Non-fiction
- Publication place: Cambridge, England
- Pages: about 240
- ISBN: 0521234913
- OCLC: 6813698

Nature, Culture and Gender is a book length social science essay collection that analyzes views that describe "nature" as inferior to "culture". Hence, the authors draw on anthropology and history to critique ideologies that, by equating women with nature, renders the female gender as inferior, while the male, equated to culture is seen as superior. The co-editors of this book published in 1980 by Cambridge University Press are Carol MacCormack and Marilyn Strathern. The contributing authors are Carol P. MacCormack, Maurice Bloch, Jean H. Bloch, L. J. Jordanova, Olivia Harris, Jane C. Goodale, Gillian Gillison, Marilyn Strathern.

== See also ==
- Culture and Society, 1780-1950
- Women, Culture, and Society

== ISBN ==
ISBNs are:

- ISBN 0521234913
- ISBN 9780521234917
- ISBN 052128001X
- ISBN 9780521280013
