= Bugkalot =

Ethnic group of the Philippines (also Ilongot)

Bugkalot people Ilongot
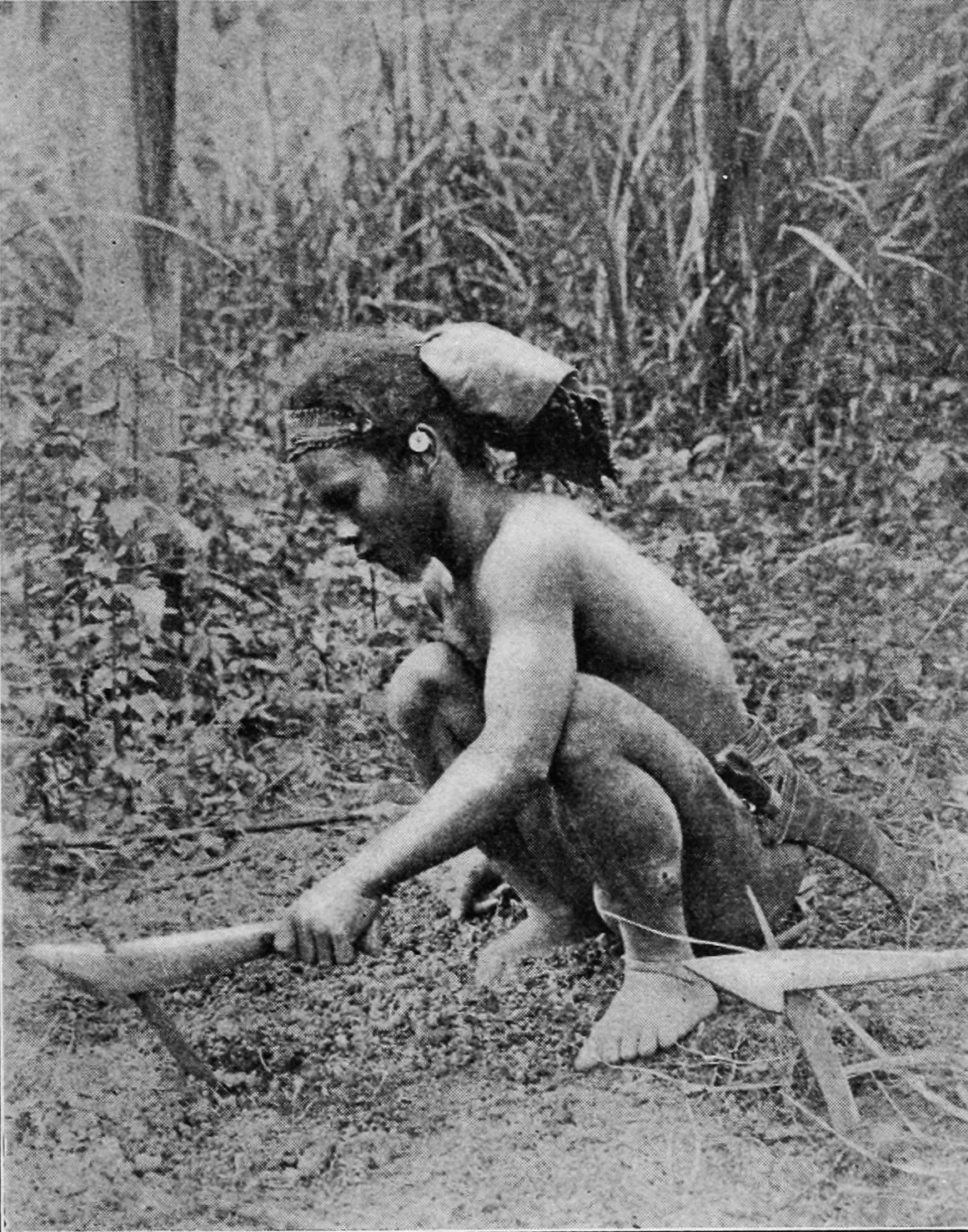
- A Bugkalot man at work in clearing (c. 1910).

Total population
- 18,712 (2020 census)

Regions with significant populations
- Philippines (Nueva Vizcaya, Nueva Ecija, Quirino, Aurora, Northern Luzon)

Languages
- Bugkalot, Ilocano, Tagalog, English

Religion
- Animism, Paganism, minority Christianity

Related ethnic groups
- Igorots, Ibanag, Ilocano, other Filipino ethnic groups

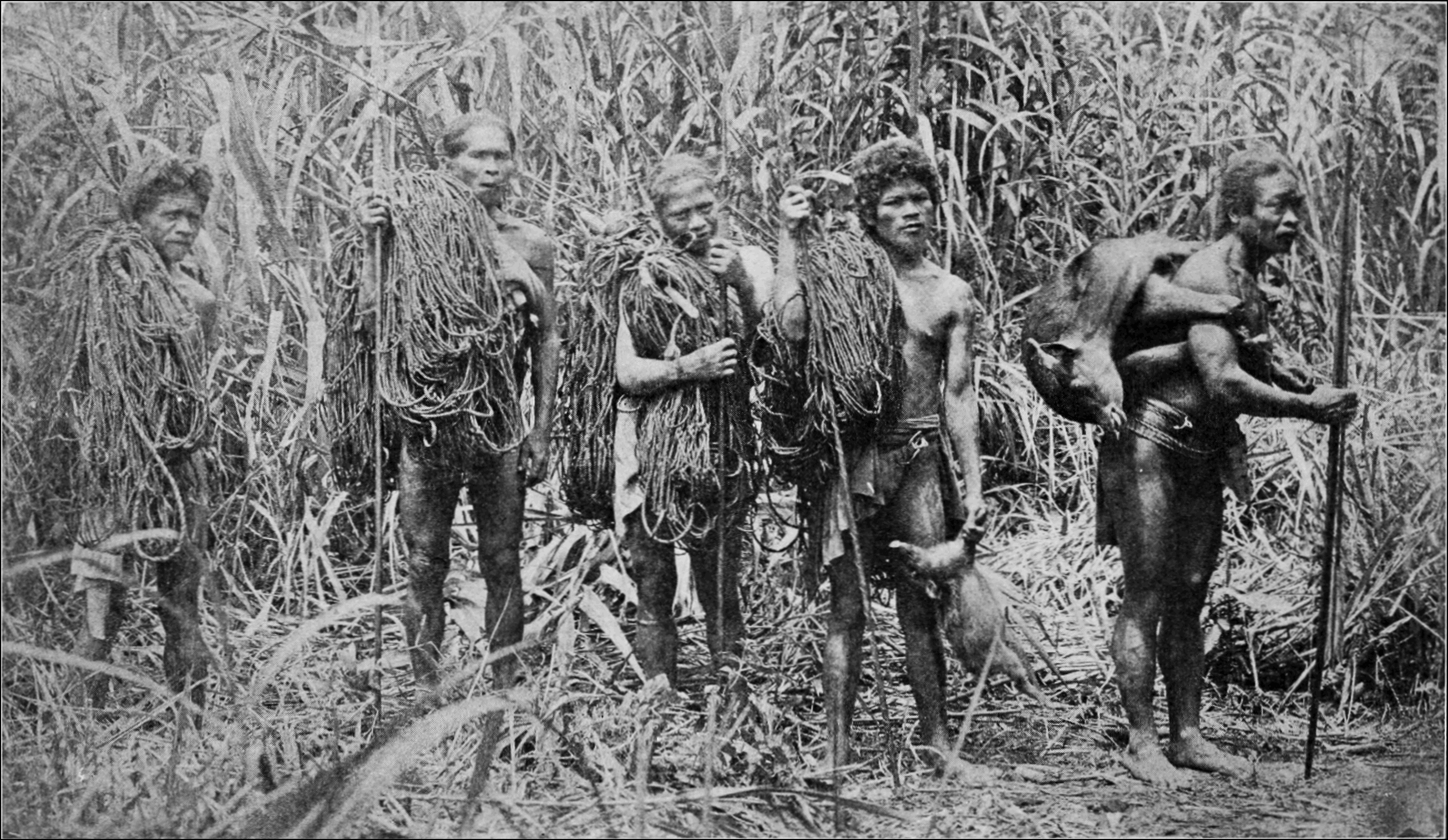
A Bugkalot hunting party.

The Bugkalot (also Ilongot or Ibilao) are an indigenous peoples inhabiting the southern Sierra Madre and Caraballo Mountains, on the east side of Luzon in the Philippines, primarily in the provinces of Nueva Vizcaya and Nueva Ecija and along the mountain border between the provinces of Quirino and Aurora. They are also commonly referred to as "Ilongot", especially in older studies, but nowadays, the endonym Bugkalot is preferred in modern ethnic research. They were formerly headhunters.

Presently, there are about 18,000 Bugkalots according to the 2020 census. The Bugkalots tend to inhabit areas close to rivers, as they provide a food source and a means for transportation. Their native language is the Bugkalot language, spoken by about 6,000 people. They also speak the Ilocano and Tagalog languages, both spoken in Nueva Ecija and Aurora, with the former also spoken in Nueva Vizcaya and Quirino.

== Population ==
Population of the Bugkalot (Ilongot/Egongot) by Province (2020)
| Province/Region | Population | % of Total |
|---|---|---|
| Aurora | 5,769 | 30.83% |
| Quirino | 5,628 | 30.08% |
| Nueva Vizcaya | 5,438 | 29.06% |
| Other Provinces (Isabela, Nueva Ecija, etc.) | 1,877 | 10.03% |
| Total (Philippines) | 18,712 | 100.00% |

== Ancestral lands ==
Indigenous Bugkalot and Ilongot communities' ancestral domain covers 212,773.47-hectare lands in Nagtipunan, Quirino; Maria Aurora and Dipaculao, Aurora; and Dupax Del Norte, Kasibu, Dupax Del Sur, and Alfonso Castañeda, Nueva Vizcaya. Their certificate of ancestral domain title (CADT) was issued on July 23, 2016, by the National Commission on Indigenous Peoples.

== Culture ==
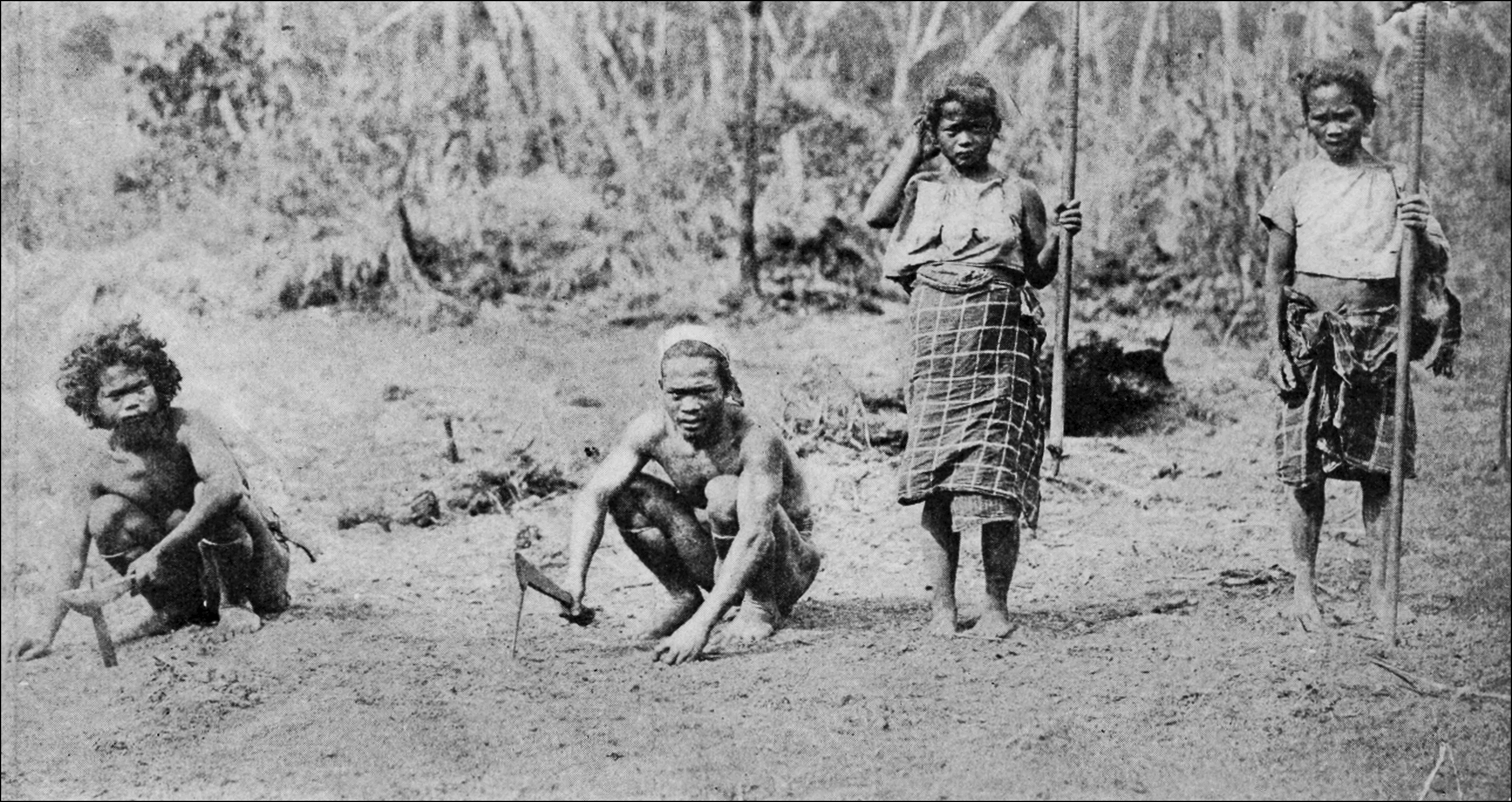
Bugkalot men and women clearing the ground for rice planting.

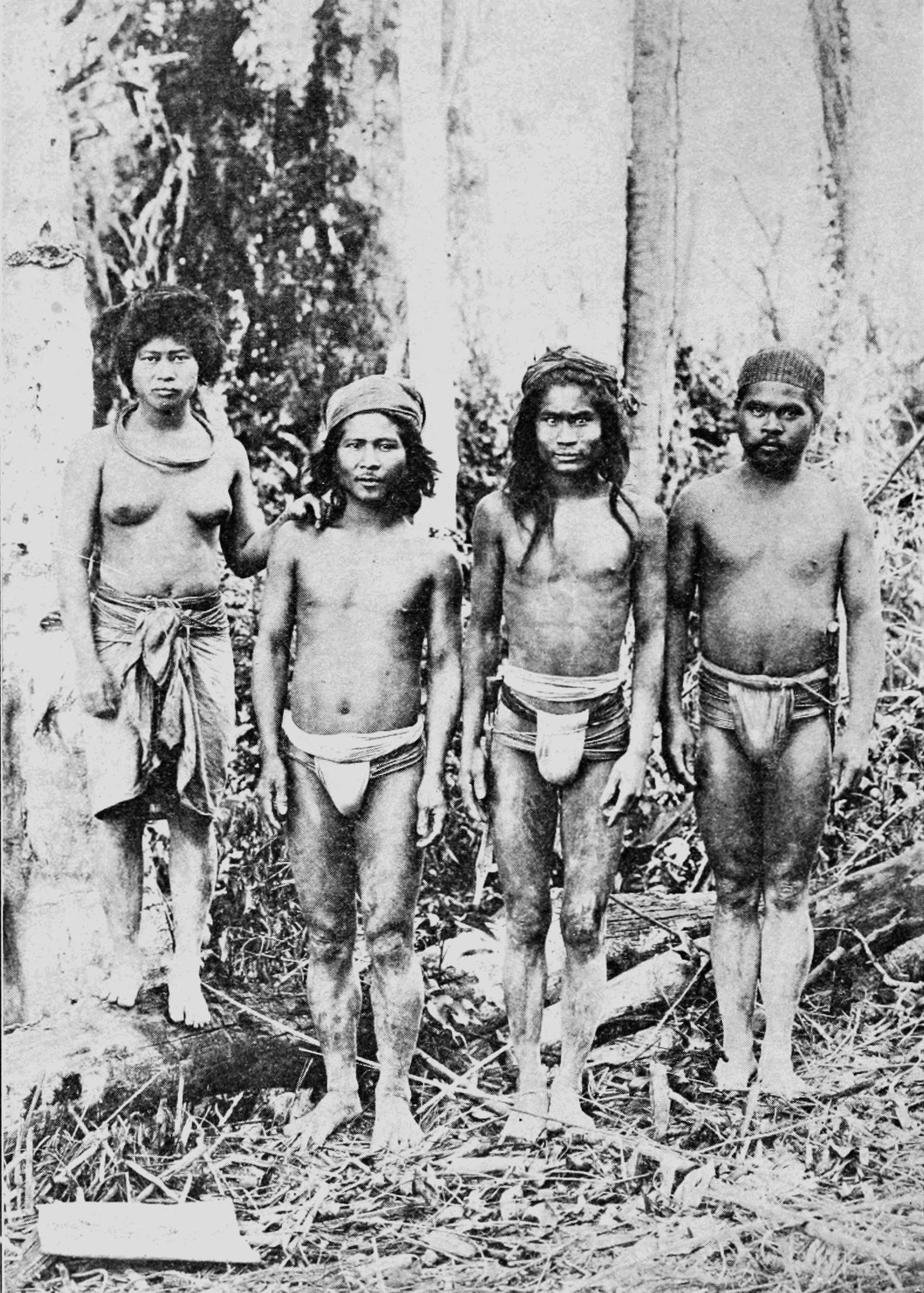
Photo taken in 1910 depicting Bugkalot men and a woman in modern-day Oyao in Nueva Vizcaya.

In Ivan Salva's study in 1980 of the Bugkalots, she described "gender differences related to the positive cultural value placed on adventure, travel, and knowledge of the external world." Bugkalot men, more often than women, visited distant places. They acquired knowledge of the outside world, amassed experiences there, and returned to share their knowledge, adventures, and feelings in a public oratory in order to pass on their knowledge to others. The Bugkalot men received acclaim as a result of their experiences. Because they lacked external experience on which to base knowledge and expression, Bugkalot women had inferior prestige.

Based on Michelle Rosaldo's study and findings of other stateless societies, anthropologists must distinguish between prestige systems and actual power within a society. Just because a male has a high level of prestige, he may not own much economic or political power compared to others that are less prestigious within the society.

Renato Rosaldo went on to study headhunting among the Bugkalots in his book Ilongot Headhunting, 1883-1974: A Study in Society and History. He notes headhunting raids are often associated with bereavement, a rage, and expiation at the loss of a loved one.

== Gallery of Bugkalot art ==
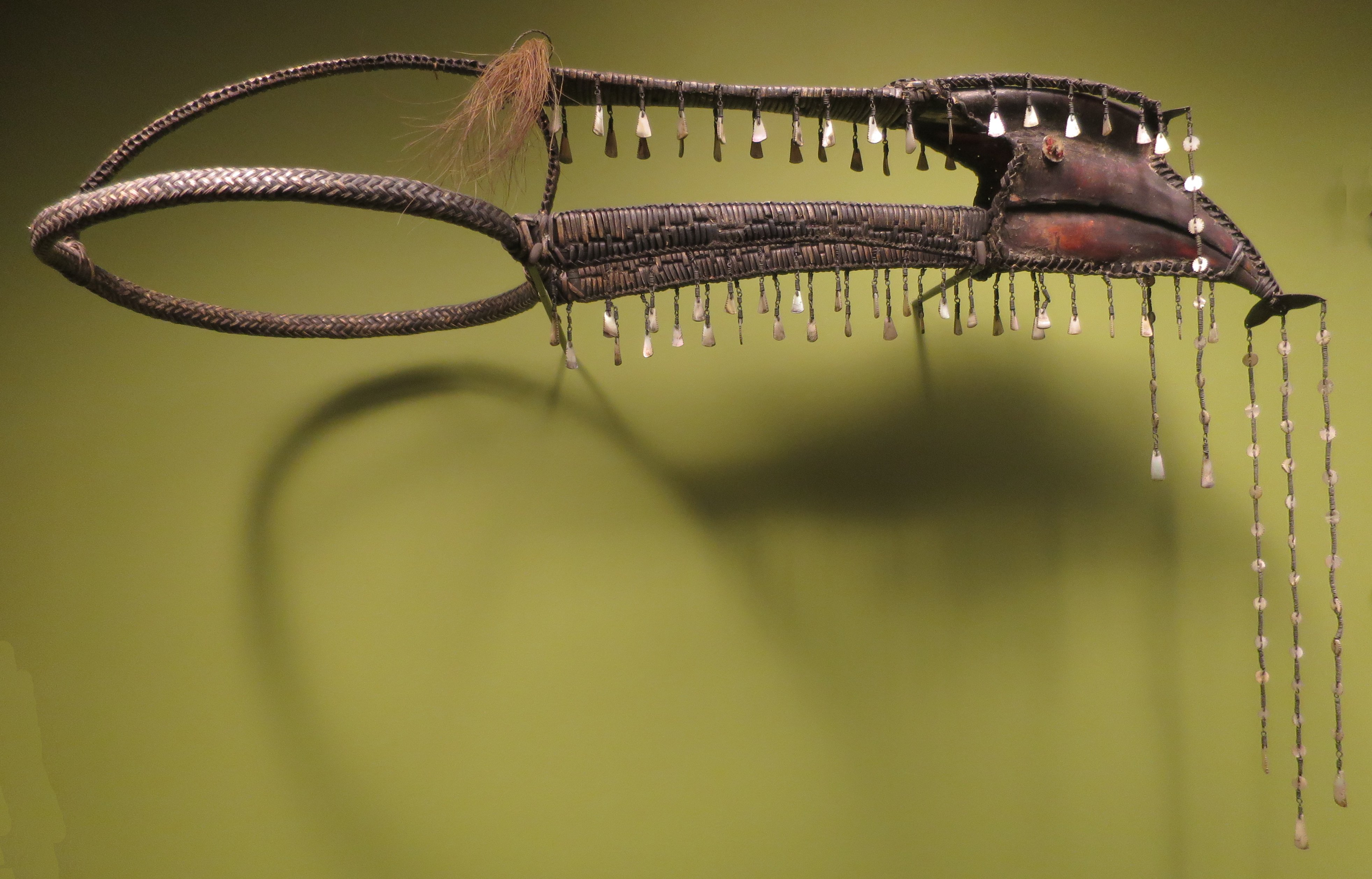
A headdress made of a hornbill's beak, shell, wire, rattan and hair

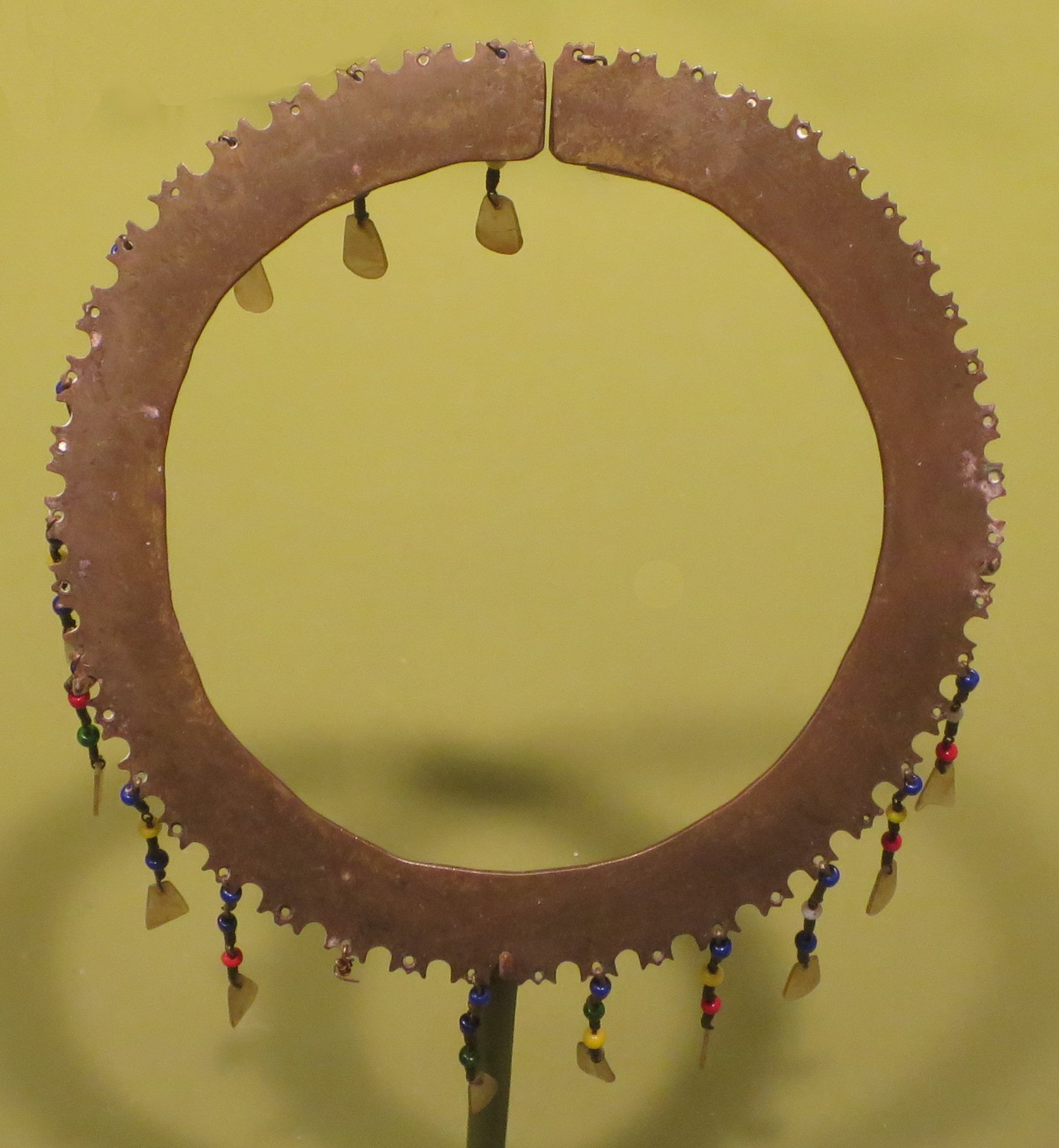
A bracelet made of brass, beads and mother of pearl

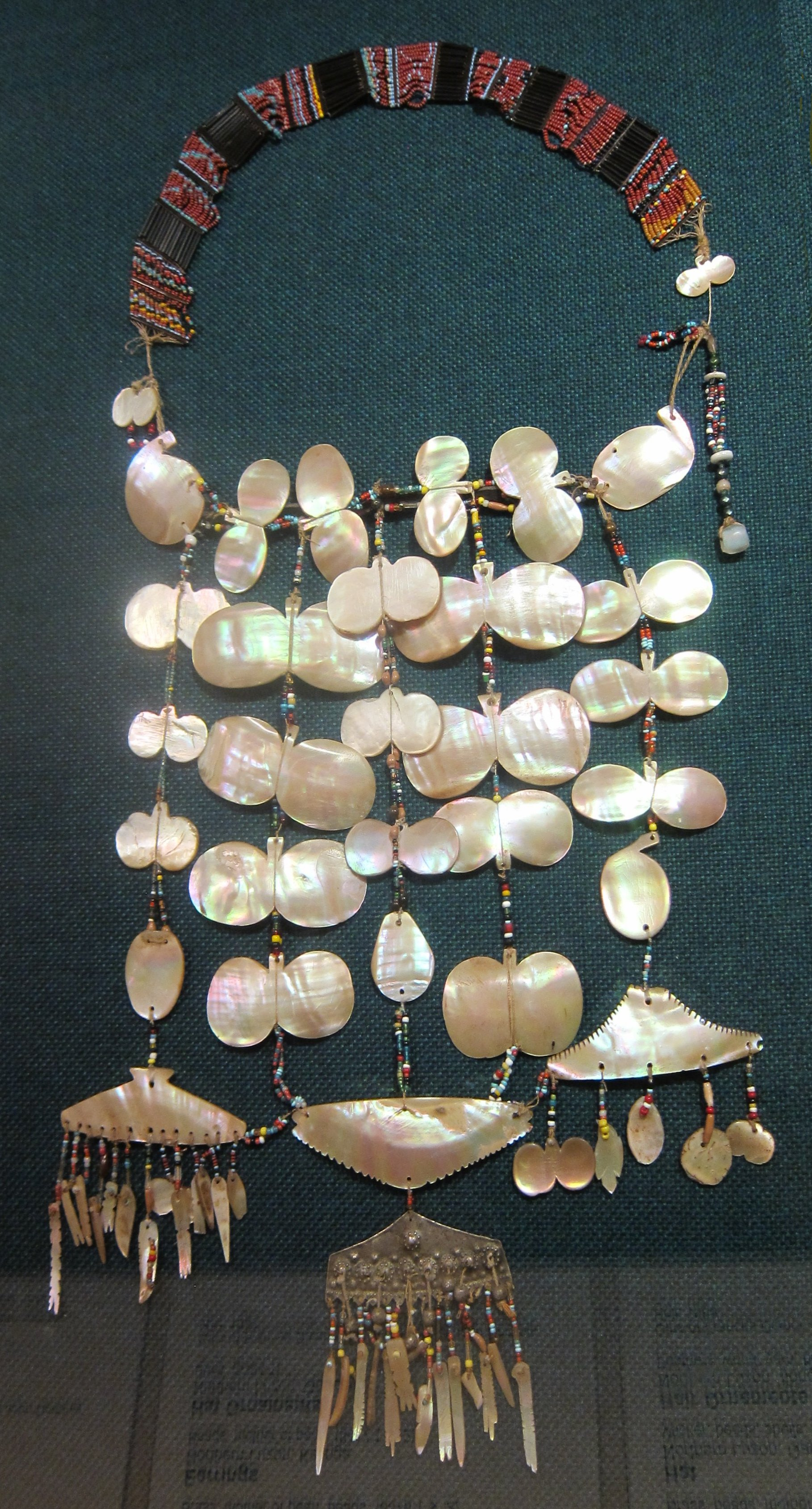
A necklace made of brass, mother-of-pearl and beads

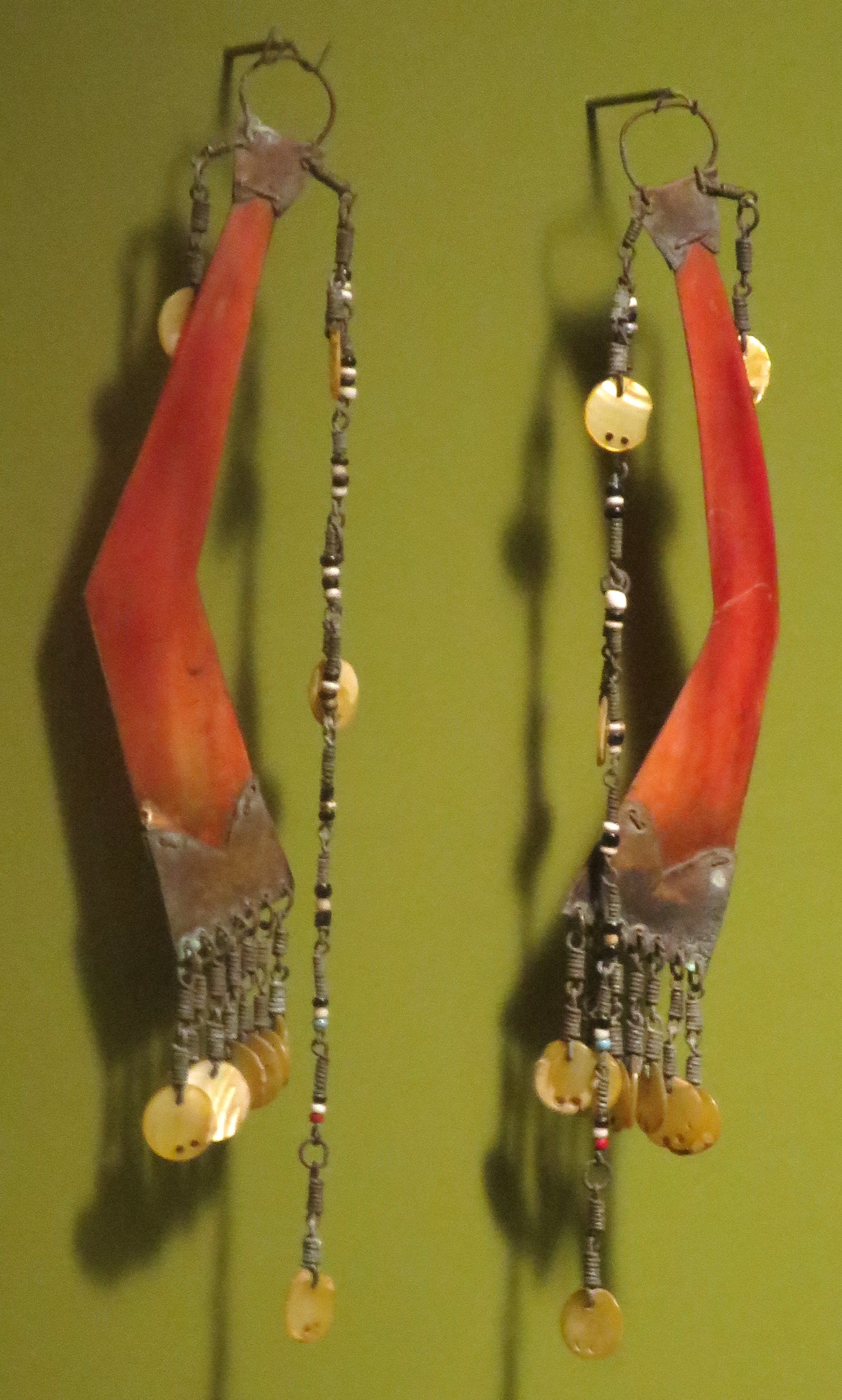
Men's ear pendants made of hornbill, discs of shell, beads and brass

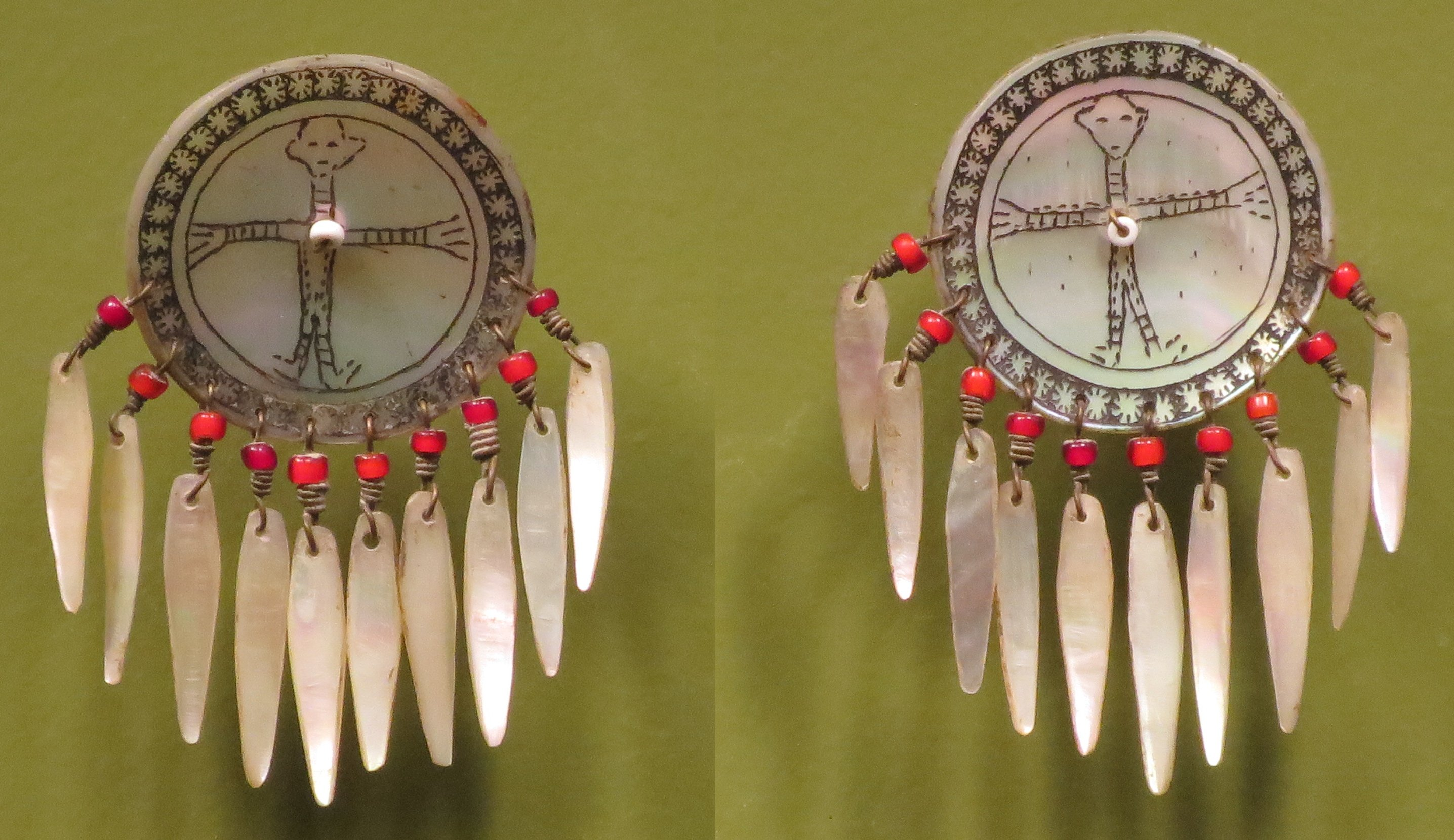
Earrings made of shell, brass and beads

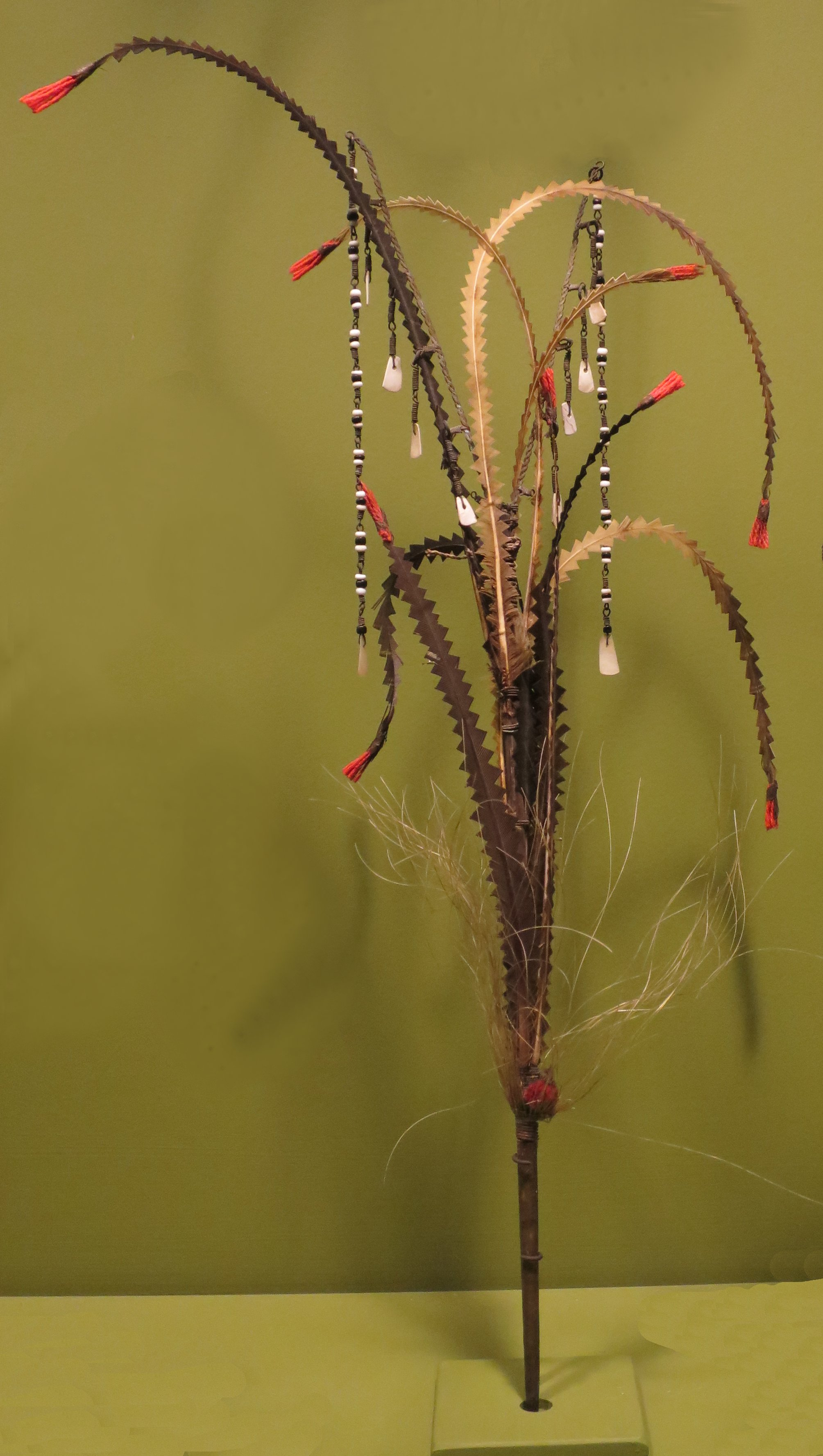
A hair ornament

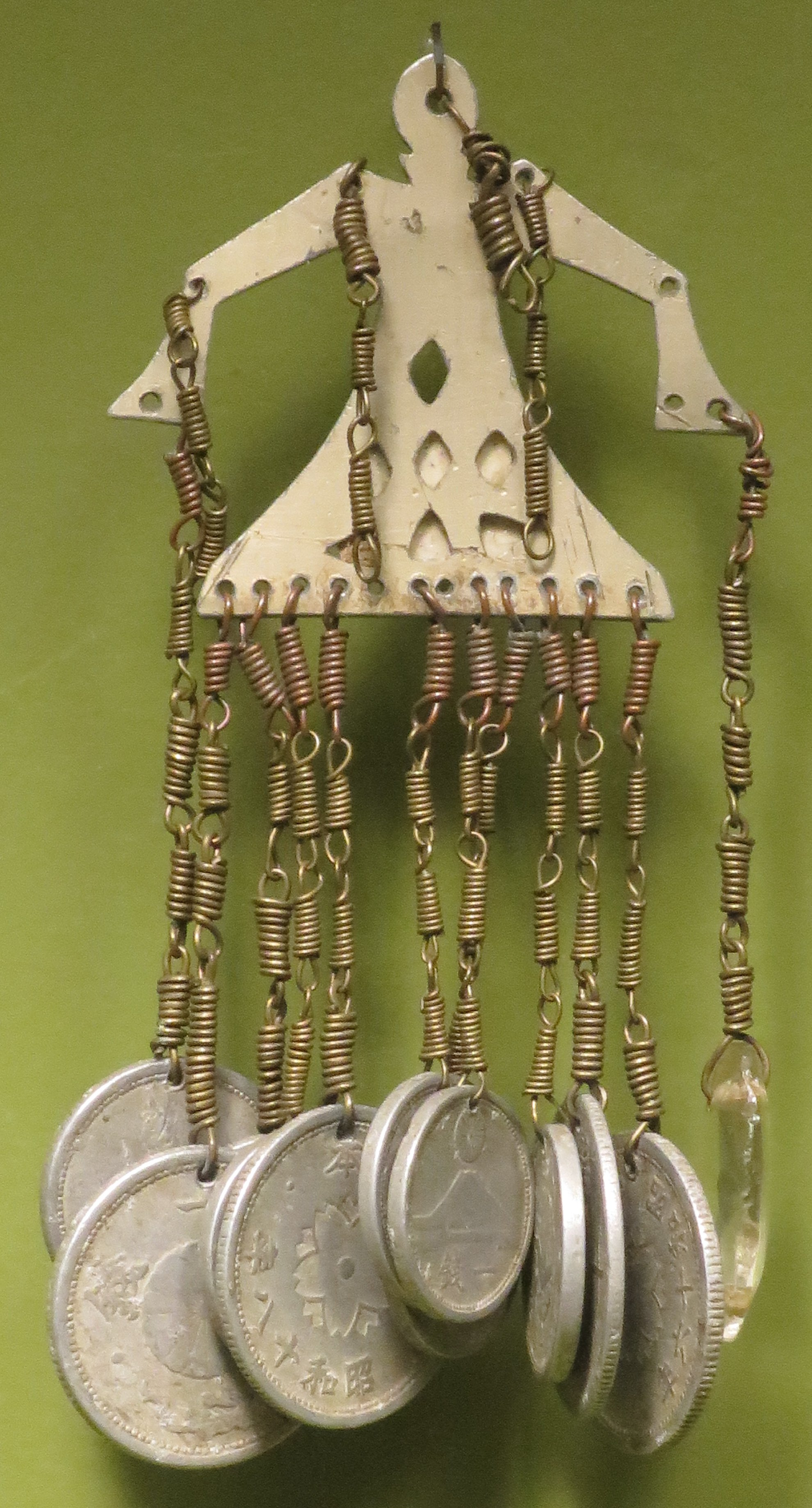
A pendant made of Japanese coins, brass, aluminum and glass

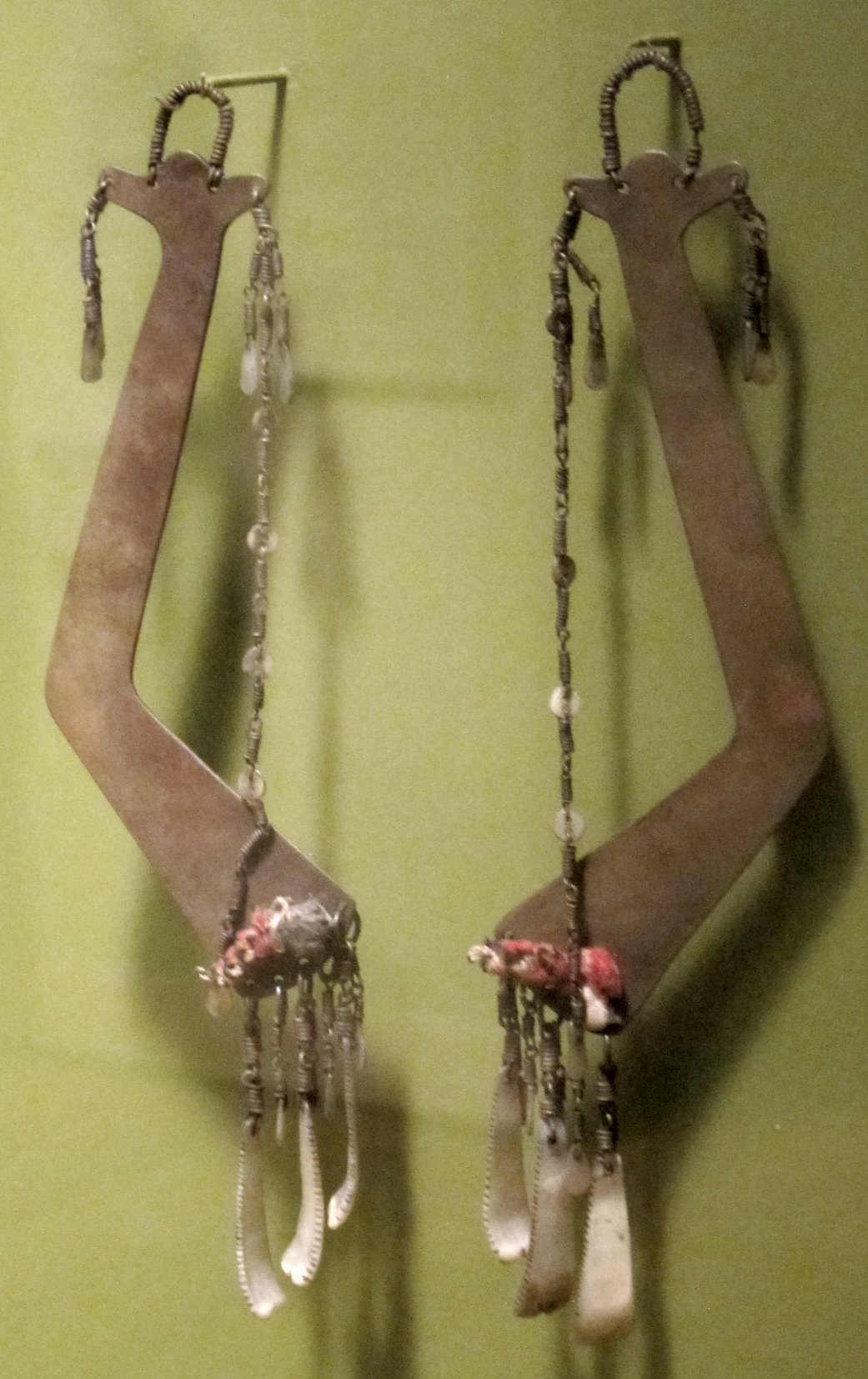
Men's ear pendants (batling) made of hornbill, brass, shell and cotton
