= Renato Rosaldo =

American anthropologist and poet (1941–2026)

- Born: 15 April 1941; Champaign, Illinois, U.S.
- Died: 26 May 2026 (aged 85); New York City, U.S.
- Spouse(s): Michelle Zimbalist (m. 1966; died 1981) Mary Louise Pratt (m. 1983)
- Children: 3

Academic background
- Education: Harvard University
- Thesis: Ilongot Social Organization
- Doctoral advisor: Evon Z. Vogt

Academic work
- Discipline: Anthropology

Renato Ignacio Rosaldo (15 April 1941 – 26 May 2026) was an American cultural anthropologist. He conducted field research among the Ilongots of northern Luzon, Philippines. He served on the faculties of Stanford University and New York University. He also published several collections of his poetry.

== Early life and education ==
Renato Rosaldo was born in Champaign, Illinois, on 15 April 1941. At a young age, Rosaldo spoke Spanish with his Mexican father and English with his mother. When he was four, his family moved to Madison, Wisconsin, where his father taught Mexican and Latin American literature at the University of Wisconsin. When he was twelve, they moved to Tucson, Arizona, where his father taught in the Spanish department at the University of Arizona. Rosaldo attended Tucson High School, where he became a member of a social club called The Chasers, about which he later wrote an eponymous book of poetry. Rosaldo has described having to relearn el trato, the interactional social contract, in different cultural settings.

He entered Harvard University in 1959, taking classes in anthropology, Spanish history, and literature. His teachers included Beatrice Whiting and Laura Nader. Rosaldo graduated from Harvard College with an A.B. degree in Spanish history and literature in 1963. He spent a year in Spain after graduating, but saw no future for Spanish scholarship under the dictatorship of Francisco Franco. Returning to Harvard, Rosaldo studied social anthropology, receiving his Ph.D. in 1971 for his work in the Philippines on Ilongot social organization.

== Career ==
Rosaldo joined the Stanford University anthropology faculty in 1970. He became the Lucie Stern Professor in the Social Sciences, and was professor emeritus. In 2003, Rosaldo left Stanford to teach at New York University, where he was also a professor emeritus and previously served as the inaugural director of Latino Studies. He was a New York Institute for the Humanities Fellow.

He served as director of the Stanford Center for Chicano Research from 1985 to 1990, president of the American Ethnological Society from 1991 to 1995, and chair of the Stanford Department of Anthropology from 1994 to 1996.

== Published work ==
Rosaldo's published anthropological works include: Ilongot Headhunting, 1883–1974: A Study in Society and History (1980); Culture and Truth: The Remaking of Social Analysis (1989); The Inca and Aztec States, 1400–1800: Anthropology and History (co-edited with George Allen Collier, 1982); Anthropology/Creativity (co-edited with Smadar Lavie and Kirin Narayan, 1993); and The Anthropology of Globalization: A Reader (co-edited with Jonathan Xavier Inda, 2002).

Rosaldo conducted research on cultural citizenship in San Jose, California, from 1989 to 1996, and he contributed two chapters (one co-written with William V. Flores) to Latino Cultural Citizenship: Claiming Identity, Space, and Rights (1997).

He was also a poet and published five volumes of poetry, including The Day of Shelly’s Death (2014), The Chasers (2019), and Into the World Outspread: Notes from a Walker (2022). The first, Prayer to Spider Woman/Rezo a la mujer araña (2003) in Spanish and English, won an American Book Award from the Before Columbus Foundation. The second, Diego Luna's Insider Tips (2012), won the Many Mountains Moving Press Poetry Book Prize for 2009. Rosaldo's poetry has also appeared in Bilingual Review, Many Mountains Moving, Prairie Schooner, Puerto del Sol, and The Texas Observer. He coined the term antropoeta to describe his movement between anthropology and poetry.

== Personal life and death ==
Rosaldo was married to anthropologist Michelle Zimbalist Rosaldo until her death in 1981. He was then in 1983 married to Mary Louise Pratt, a scholar of language and literature. He had three children, and three grandchildren.

Rosaldo died in Manhattan, New York, on 26 May 2026, at the age of 85, from complications of a stroke.

== Awards ==
- 1997 American Academy of Arts and Sciences membership
- 2004 American Book Award

== Selected works ==
=== Poetry collections ===
- Prayer to Spider Woman / Rezo a la Mujer Araña. Instituto Coahuilense de Cultura, Gobierno del Estado de Coahuila. 2003. LCCN 2004372302.
- Diego Luna's Insider Tips. Many Mountains Moving. 2012. ISBN 9781886976269.
- The Day of Shelly's Death: The Poetry and Ethnography of Grief. Duke University Press. 2014. ISBN 978-0-8223-5661-5.
- The Chasers. Duke University Press. 2019. ISBN 978-1-4780-0418-9.
- Into the World Outspread: Notes from a Walker. Casa Urraca Press. 2022. ISBN 978-1-956375-08-4.

=== Anthropology books ===
==== As author ====
- Ilongot Headhunting: 1883–1974: A Study in Society and History. Stanford University Press. 1980. ISBN 978-0-8047-1284-2.
- Culture & Truth: The Remaking of Social Analysis. Beacon Press. 1993. ISBN 978-0-8070-4623-4.

==== As editor ====
- Creativity/Anthropology. With Smadar Lavie and Kirin Narayan. Cornell University Press. 1993. ISBN 978-0-8014-2255-3.
- Cultural Citizenship in Island Southeast Asia: Nation and Belonging in the Hinterlands. University of California Press. 2003. ISBN 978-0-520-22748-4.
- A Companion to Latina/o Studies. With Juan Flores. Wiley-Blackwell. 2007. ISBN 978-1405126229.
- Anthropology of Globalization. With Jonathan Xavier Inda. Wiley-Blackwell. 2007. ISBN 978-1-4051-3613-6.

=== Chapters and articles ===
- Nancy Scheper-Hughes; Philippe I. Bourgois, eds. (2004). "Grief and a Headhunter's Rage". Violence in War and Peace. Wiley-Blackwell. ISBN 978-0-631-22349-8.
- Linda Alcoff; Eduardo Mendieta, eds. (2003). "Cultural Citizenship, Inequality, and Multiculturalism". Identities: Race, Class, Gender, and Nationality. Wiley-Blackwell. ISBN 978-0-631-21723-7.
- Simón During, ed. (1993). "After objectivism". The Cultural Studies Reader. Routledge. p. 104. ISBN 978-0-415-07709-5. "Renato Rosaldo."
- Victor W. Turner; Edward M. Bruner, eds. (1986). "Ilongot Hunting as Story and Experience". The Anthropology of Experience. University of Illinois Press. ISBN 978-0252012495.
- "Of Headhunters and Soldiers: Separating Cultural and Ethical Relativism". Issues in Ethics. 11 (1). Winter 2000.
