= Sherry Ortner =

American anthropologist (born 1941)

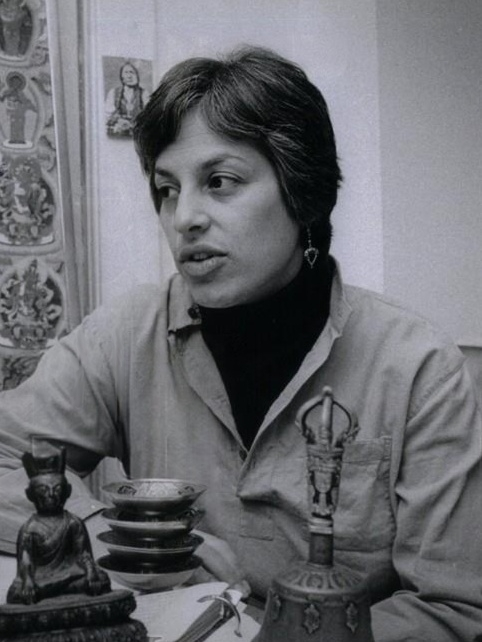
Ortner in 1979

Sherry Beth Ortner (born September 19, 1941) is an American cultural anthropologist. She is a Distinguished Professor of Anthropology (Emerita) at UCLA.

Ortner is known for her contributions to social theory and feminist theory, as well as for her ethnographic work in Nepal and the U.S. Her work has been widely translated and she has received numerous awards.

== Life and career ==
Ortner grew up in a middle-class Jewish family of Eastern European descent in Newark, New Jersey. She is married to Timothy D. Taylor an ethnomusicologist and musicologist also at UCLA. She has a daughter from a previous marriage.

Ortner graduated from Weequahic High School in 1958. She received her B.A. from Bryn Mawr College in 1962 and went on to study anthropology at the University of Chicago, where she received her M.A. in 1966, and her Ph.D. in 1970.

She has taught at Sarah Lawrence College (1970–77); the University of Michigan (1977–94); the University of California, Berkeley (1994–96); Columbia University (1996–2004); and, since 2004, the University of California, Los Angeles.

She has held research appointments at the Institute for Advanced Study in Princeton (1973–74, and 1989–90), the Center for Advanced Study in the Behavioral Sciences in Palo Alto (1982–83), and the National Humanities Center in Research Triangle Park, North Carolina (1999–2000).

She has received numerous awards and fellowships, including the MacArthur Foundation "Genius" Fellowship and a Guggenheim Fellowship; grants from the National Science Foundation and the National Endowment for the Humanities; and the Retzius Medal of the Swedish Society for Anthropology and Geography.

She has been elected a Fellow of the American Academy of Arts and Sciences and the British Academy.

== Significant contributions ==
Ortner is well known for her contributions to social theory. Drawing on the work of Pierre Bourdieu, Anthony Giddens, and Marshall Sahlins, she sought to develop her own version of practice theory, a theory that emphasizes that both social continuity and social transformation are the products of the practices of real people in real times and places. Ortner's version emphasizes the social transformation side, and emphasizes the role of agency and intentionality in bringing about change. Her first work and one of her most frequently cited publications in this area was an article called "Theory in Anthropology Since the Sixties" (1984).

A central part of practice theory, according to Ortner, is the theorization of "resistance," of people pushing back against practices of power and domination. She views resistance as a complex form of practice, as even people in dominated positions may have vested interests in the status quo. Ortner later wrote an article exploring these complexities: "Resistance and the Problem of Ethnographic Refusal" (1995). These and other articles growing out of the practice theory framework were later collected in an edited volume, Anthropology and Social Theory: Culture, Power, and the Acting Subject (2006).

Ortner is equally well known for her work in feminist theory. During the early 1970s she became actively involved in the feminist movement as it was taking shape. Her scholarship of this time focused on deconstructing the mechanisms of male dominance, misogyny, and patriarchy. Her first and most notable article in this area, "Is Female to Male as Nature is to Culture?" (1972/1974), has been translated into 10 languages and has been reprinted in 25 different collections.

== Early scholarship (1960s - 1990s) ==
As a graduate student at the University of Chicago Ortner was advised by Clifford Geertz. Geertz's major work focused on rethinking the concept of 'culture', central to American anthropology. Geertz's research and writing emphasized the ways in which culture can be read and described as symbolic system or a system of meanings. Ortner's doctoral research, ethnography conducted between 1966 and 1968 in the Khumbu region of Nepal focused on rituals of religion and ordinary social life of the Sherpa community. Her first book, Sherpas Through Their Rituals (1978), was heavily influenced by Geertz's perspective on culture and meaning.

It was in this period that Ortner turned her attention to theoretical frameworks that would provide insight into questions of inequality, and into social transformation. Much of historical approach to practice theory was worked out in her next Sherpa monograph, High Religion: A Cultural and Political History of Sherpa Buddhism (1989).

Ortner wrote one more book on the Sherpas, focusing on the complex history of the relationship between western mountaineers and the Sherpa people they employed as guides and porters in their attempts to climb the highest peaks in the world. Her book on the subject, Life and Death on Mt. Everest: Sherpas and Himalayan Mountaineering (1999), was awarded the J.I. Staley Prize for the best anthropology book of 2004.

In this period Ortner also continued her work in feminist theory. She wrote further articles elaborating on, and in some cases modifying, the arguments in "Is Female to Male as Nature is to Culture," weaving these together with the practice theory framework. These articles were collected in a volume called Making Gender: The Politics and Erotics of Culture (1996).

== Later scholarship (2000s - 2020s) ==
Following the conclusion of her work in Nepal, Ortner turned her attention to the critical anthropology of the United States. This was the beginning of a series of projects on capitalism, class, and culture in late 20th and early 21st century America.

Her first American project was an ethnographic and historical study of her high school graduating class, the Class of '58 of Weequaic High School in Newark, NJ. The study focused on how social class, as well as race, ethnicity, and gender, shaped the lives and experiences of her high school classmates, both in their high school years, and in their subsequent lives and careers. Ortner's book, published in 2003, was titled New Jersey Dreaming: Capital, Culture, and the Class of '58. In this book Ortner creates an ethnographic portrait of a group of people who grew up under the relatively benevolent capitalism of mid-century America, and who largely prospered under this regime.

In a chapter of Visions of Culture: an Introduction to Anthropological Theorists and Theories (2004), profiling Ortner and her work, Jerry Moore summarizes:

Ortner's work on American society is theoretically connected to her earlier writings on Sherpa ethnography or feminist anthropology. In each case, Ortner has a fundamental interest in how power relations are given meaning. This is true of Ortner's early writings about the cultural construction of gender and the universality of female subordination, the internal contradictions of egalitarianism and hierarchy in Sherpa society, or the complexities of race, gender, and class in American society.

While researching for the New Jersey Dreaming book, Ortner also interviewed a large number of children of the Class of '58, members of Generation X. From this Ortner published "Generation X: Anthropology in a Media-Saturated World" (1998), in which she treats the generational shift as illustrative of the shift from the mid-century capitalism of their parents to the "late" capitalism of the 1980s and 90s, a transformation that occurred during their youth and shaped their worldview. In addition to ethnographic interviews, Ortner also utilized film and other representations of Generation X to make her argument.

Ortner's research from this period is focused on understanding both the societal effects and changing cultural narratives in response to changes in the political and economic system in the United States that began in the 1980s with Reaganomics and has been broadly characterized as neoliberalism. Her research methods and overall approach in this period also shifted towards an integration of practice theory and a renewed interest in meanings and representations (a la Geertz), in which contemporary media, especially films, which are analogous to and can be analyzed and understood in the same ways that anthropologists have historically analyzed the myths and symbolic systems of the "exotic others".

Out of this shift in her research focus, Ortner published the book Not Hollywood: Independent Film at the Twilight of the American Dream (2013), and several articles, including "Too Soon for Post-Feminism: The Ongoing Life of Patriarchy in Neoliberal America" (2014) and "Racializing Patriarchy: Lessons from Police Brutality" (2020).

Across these works Ortner contrasts the cultural narratives from the optimistic, "happy ending" narratives of mid-century capitalism and the 'American Dream', to the much darker, more violent, and pessimistic representations in popular culture and media, especially Independent Film, reflecting the increasing economic precarity, and the view that the American Dream was no longer attainable. Looking at the intersection of race, class, and gender, Ortner's recent research has focused not only on the question of the attainability of the so-called American dream, but how patriarchy and racism intersect with capitalism, and how these intersections are both experienced and represented.

Ortner again turned her lens back to analysis of her own discipline in "Dark Anthropology and its Others: Theory Since the Eighties" (2016), in which she discussed the expanding influence of theorists of domination, power and exploitation, such as Marx and Foucault, and the widespread trend toward the ethnographic study of power and inequality.

Research for her most recent book, Screening Social Justice: Brave New Films and Documentary Activism (2023), was accomplished through an ethnographic study of the activist film company Brave New Films, and interviews with the makers of the films. In this book, Ortner bridges discussions of the social, economic, historical and political context of the production of these activist films, along with the way in which the makers of the films think about what they are producing, and Ortner's own analysis of the films and their impact.

== Selected publications ==
- (1974) "Is female to male as nature is to culture?" pp. 67–87 in Woman, Culture, and Society, edited by M. Z. Rosaldo and L. Lamphere. Stanford, CA: Stanford University Press.
- (1978) Sherpas through their Rituals. Cambridge: Cambridge University Press.(ISBN 9780521292160)
- (1981) Sexual Meanings: The Cultural Construction of Gender and Sexuality (co-edited with Harriet Whitehead). Cambridge: Cambridge University Press.(ISBN 9780521239653)
- (1984) "Theory in Anthropology Since the Sixties." Comparative Studies in Society and History 26(1):126-166.
- (1989) High Religion: A Cultural and Political History of Sherpa Buddhism. Princeton, NJ: Princeton University Press.(ISBN 9788120809499)
- (1995) Resistance and the Problem of Ethnographic Refusal. Comparative Studies in Society and History 37(1):173-193
- (1996) Making Gender: The Politics and Erotics of Culture. Boston: Beacon Press.(ISBN 9780807046333)
- (1999) Life and Death on Mount Everest: Sherpas and Himalayan Mountaineering. Princeton, NJ: Princeton University Press.(ISBN 9780691074481)
- (1999) (ed.) The Fate of "Culture": Geertz and Beyond. Berkeley, CA: University of California Press.(ISBN 9780520216013)
- (2003) New Jersey Dreaming: Capital, Culture, and the Class of '58. Durham, NC: Duke University Press. (ISBN 9780822331087)
- (2006) Anthropology and Social Theory: Culture, Power, and the Acting Subject. Durham, NC: Duke University Press.(ISBN 9780822388456)
- (2013) Not Hollywood: Independent Film at the Twilight of the American Dream. Durham, NC: Duke University Press.(ISBN 9780822354260)
- (2023) Screening Social Justice: Brave New Films and Documentary Activism. Durham, NC: Duke University Press.(ISBN 9781478024132)
