= Bellagio declaration =

The Bellagio Declaration is a resolution formed in 1993, with the aim of reforming intellectual property laws in order to foster the protection of folkloric works, works of cultural heritage, and the biological and ecological know-how of traditional peoples.

The Declaration was written as a result of the 1993 Rockefeller Foundation Conference "Cultural Agency/Cultural Authority: Politics and Poetics of Intellectual Property in the Post-Colonial Era".
