= Woman, Culture, and Society =

- Paperback edition
- Author: Michelle Zimbalist Rosaldo; Louise Lamphere
- Language: English
- Subject: rethinking anthropology by centering women
- Genre: Anthology of scholarly papers
- Publisher: Stanford University Press
- Publication date: 1974
- Publication place: United States
- Media type: Print
- ISBN: 978-0804708517
- OCLC: 890898
- Dewey Decimal: 301.41/2
- LC Class: 73089861

Woman, Culture, and Society, first published in 1974 (Stanford University Press), is a book consisting of 16 papers contributed by female authors and an introduction by the editors Michelle Zimbalist Rosaldo and Louise Lamphere. On the heels of the 1960s feminist movement, this book challenged anthropology's status quo of viewing studied cultures from a male perspective while diminishing female perspectives, even considering women as comparatively imperceptible. It is considered to be a pioneering work.

The book features a number of widely cited essays including:

- In "Family Structure and Feminine Personality," Nancy Chodorow offers a psychoanalytic explanations for gender differences in personality, based on mother's primary role in raising small children and socializing girls into their gendered roles.
- In "Is female to male as nature is to culture?," first published in Feminist Studies, Sherry Ortner argues that the universal (or near universal) subordination of women across cultures is explained in part by a common conception of women as "closer to nature than men" (73). The title describes a structuralist analogy between deep cultural structures, in the sense theorized by Claude Lévi-Strauss. It described cultural oppositions including culture/nature, man/woman, mind/body, public/private, civilized/primitive, and active/passive. In 1996, Ortner remembered it as "my first piece of feminist writing and my second professional publication."

The title of the book alludes to the gendered nature of a prior anthropological text, Man, Culture, and Society.

== See also ==
- Nature, Culture and Gender
