= Louise Lamphere =

American anthropologist

- Born: October 4, 1940 (age 86)

Academic background
- Education: Stanford University; Harvard University

Academic work
- Institutions: University of New Mexico; Brown University
- Notable works: Woman, Culture, and Society

Louise Lamphere (born October 4, 1940) is an American anthropologist who has been distinguished professor of anthropology at the University of New Mexico since 2001. She was a faculty member at UNM from 1976 to 1979, and from 1986 to 2009, when she became a professor emerita.

Lamphere served as president of the American Anthropological Association from 1999 to 2001.

== Career ==
Lamphere received her B.A. and M.A. from Stanford University in 1962 and 1966 and her Ph.D. from Harvard University in 1968. She has published extensively throughout her career on subjects as diverse as the Navajo and their medicinal practices and de-industrialisation and urban anthropology; nonetheless she is possibly best known for her work on feminist anthropology and gender issues.

In 1977, Lamphere became an associate of the Women's Institute for Freedom of the Press (WIFP).

Lamphere was the co-editor, with Michelle Zimbalist Rosaldo, of Woman, Culture, and Society, the first volume to address the anthropological study of gender and women's status.

In the 1970s, after being denied tenure at Brown University, Lamphere brought a class action suit against Brown for gender discrimination. She won an out-of-court settlement that served as a model for future suits by others. In 2015, Brown announced a series of events (including a symposium) examining the important impact of the suit and its settlement.

In 2005, Lamphere supervised an ethnographic team which examined the impact of Medicaid managed care in New Mexico. The team published their articles in a special issue of Medical Anthropology Quarterly. In her introduction, she emphasized the impact of increased bureaucratization on women workers in health care clinics, emergency rooms and small doctors offices.

Lamphere was elected as the member of the School for Advanced Research on August 5, 2017.

== Awards ==
In 2013, she was awarded the Franz Boas Award for Exemplary Service to Anthropology from the American Anthropological Association.

On May 24, 2015, Brown University awarded Lamphere an honorary doctorate (honoris causa) for her "courage in standing up for equity and fairness for all faculty and [her] exemplary examinations of urban anthropology, healthcare practices and gender issues."

In 2017, she was awarded the Bronislaw Malinowski Award by The Society of Applied Anthropology.

== Selected works ==
- Sunbelt Working Mothers: Reconciling Family and Factory. Co-authored with Patricia Zavella, Felipe Gonzales and Peter B. Evans. Ithaca: Cornell University Press. 1993
- Newcomers in the Workplace: Immigrants and the Restructuring of the U.S. Economy, co-edited with Guillermo Grenier. Philadelphia: Temple University Press. 1994.
- Situated Lives: Gender and Culture in Everyday Life (edited with Helena Ragone' and Patricia Zavella) New York: Routledge Press. 1997.
- "Gender Models in the Southwest: Sociocultural Perspectives" in Women & Men in the Prehispanic Southwest, edited by Patricia L. Crown. Santa Fe: School of American Research Press. pp. 379–402. 2001.
- "Rereading and Remembering Michelle Rosaldo" in Gender Matters: Rereading Michelle Z. Rosaldo. ed. by Alejandro Lugo and Bill Maurer. Ann Arbor: The University of Michigan Press. pp. 1–15. 2001
- "Perils and Prospects for an Engaged Anthropology: A view from the U.S." (2002 Plenary address of the meetings of the European Association of Social Anthropology. Social Anthropology 11(2): 13–28. 2003.
- "Women, Culture, and Society". Co-edited with Michelle Zimbalist Rosaldo. Stanford, CA: Stanford University Press. 1974.
- "Unofficial Histories: A Vision of Anthropology From the Margins." 2001 American Anthropological Association Presidential Address. American Anthropologist 106(1). 2004.
