= Michelle Rosaldo =

American anthropologist (1944–1981)

- Born: Michelle Zimbalist; 1944; New York City, New York, USA
- Died: 1981 (aged 37); Philippines
- Spouse: Renato Rosaldo

Michelle "Shelly" Zimbalist Rosaldo (1944 – 1981) was an anthropologist known for her studies of the Ilongot people in the Philippines and of women's studies and the anthropology of gender.

== Life ==
Born in New York City in 1944, Michelle Zimbalist attended Radcliffe College, where she studied English history and literature. She spent a summer among the Maya in Chiapas, Mexico as part of a field trip supervised by Evon Z. Vogt and George A. Collier. After receiving her undergraduate degree, she began graduate studies at Harvard in social anthropology.

Rosaldo and her husband, anthropologist Renato Rosaldo, both carried out their dissertation fieldwork with the Ilongot people in northern Luzon, Philippines, during 1967–1969. Rosaldo's psychological anthropology research focused on Ilongot expressions of emotion through figures of speech. Rosaldo received her PhD in social anthropology from Harvard in 1972. After completing their PhDs, Michelle and Renato Rosaldo were both hired at Stanford University. The couple returned again to the Ilongot in 1974 for further research, and Michelle Rosaldo published Knowledge and Passion in 1980.

Rosaldo wrote and edited several works in the anthropology of women and gender relations, and co-founded the Program in Feminist Studies at Stanford University. In 1979 she received Stanford's Dinkelspiel Award for outstanding service to undergraduate education.

Rosaldo died from an accidental fall while conducting fieldwork in the Philippines in 1981.

The Michelle Z. Rosaldo Summer Field Research Grant was later established in her memory at the Department of Anthropology at Stanford University to provide funding for undergraduate students to conduct fieldwork.

== Selected publications ==
- Context and metaphor in Ilongot oral tradition (PhD thesis). Harvard University. 1971.
- Knowledge and Passion: Ilongot Notions of Self and Social Life. Cambridge University Press. 1980. ISBN 978-0-521-22582-3.
- "Toward An Anthropology of Self and Feeling". Culture Theory: Essays on Mind, Self and Emotion. Edited by Richard A. Shweder and Robert A. LeVine. Cambridge University Press. 1984. ISBN 978-0-521-26719-9.
- Feminist Theory: A Critique of Ideology. Edited with Nannerl Keohane and Barbara C. Gelpi. University of Chicago Press. 1982.
- Woman, Culture, and Society. Edited with Louise Lamphere. Stanford University Press. 1974. ISBN 978-0-8047-0850-0.
- Gender Matters: Rereading Michelle Z. Rosaldo. Edited by Alejandro Lugo and William M. Maurer. University of Michigan Press. 2000. ISBN 978-0-472-11046-9.
