= Ruth Benedict Prize =

Annual prize for anthropology academic works

The Ruth Benedict Prize is an award given annually by the American Anthropological Association's "to acknowledge excellence in a scholarly book written from an anthropological perspective about a lesbian, gay, bisexual, or transgender topic". The award was established in 1986 in honor of anthropologist, Ruth Benedict (1887–1948) and is given in two separate categories: a monograph by a single author and an edited volume.

== List of winners ==
Prize winners
Year	Author	Title	Category
1986	Walter L. Williams	The Spirit and the Flesh: Sexual Diversity in American Indian Culture	Monograph
1987	Gilbert Herdt	The Sambia: Ritual and Gender in New Guinea	Monograph
1990	Serena Nanda	Neither Man nor Woman: The Hijras of India	Monograph
1990	Kath Weston	Families We Choose: Lesbians, Gays, Kinship	Monograph
1991	Richard Parker	Bodies, Pleasures, and Passions: Sexual Culture in Contemporary Brazil	Monograph
1992	Ellen Lewin	Lesbian Mothers: Accounts of Gender in American Culture	Monograph
1993	Elizabeth Lapovsky Kennedy and Madeline D. Davis	Boots of Leather, Slippers of Gold: The History of a Lesbian Community	Book
1993	Roger Lancaster	Life is Hard: Machismo, Danger, and the Intimacy of Power in Nicaragua	Monograph
1994	Esther Newton	Cherry Grove, Fire Island: Sixty Years in America’s First Gay and Lesbian Town	Monograph
1995	Joseph Carrier	De Los Otros: Intimacy and Homosexuality Among Mexican Men	Monograph
1996	Carter Wilson	Hidden in the Blood: A Personal Investigation of AIDS in the Yucatan	Monograph
1996	William L. Leap	Word’s Out: Gay Men’s English	Monograph
1997	Sue-Ellen Jacobs, Wesley Thomas, and Sabine Lang	Two-spirit People: Native American Gender Identity, Sexuality, and Spirituality	Edited Volume
1997	Kath Weston	Render Me, Gender Me: Lesbians Talk Sex, Class, Color, Nation, Studmuffins	Monograph
1998	Jennifer Robertson	Takarazuka: Sexual Politics and Popular Culture in Modern Japan	Monograph
1999	Evelyn Blackwood and Saskia Wieringa	Female Desires: Same Sex Relations and Transgender Practices Across Cultures	Edited Volume
2000	Barbara L. Voss and Robert A. Schmidt	Archaeologies of Sexuality	Edited Volume
2000	Stephen O. Murray	Homosexualities	Monograph
2000	Esther Newton	Margaret Mead Made Me Gay: Personal Essays, Public Ideas	Monograph
2001	Arlene Stein	The Stranger Next Door: The Story of a Small Community’s Battle over Sex, Faith, and Civil Rights	Monograph
2002	Hector Carrillo	The Night is Young: Sexuality in Mexico in the Time of AIDS	Monograph
2003	Martin F. Manalansan IV	Global Divas: Filipino Gay Men in the Diaspora	Monograph
2004	Ellen Lewin and William L. Leap	Out in Theory: The Emergence of Lesbian and Gay Anthropology	Edited Volume
2004	Megan Sinnott	Toms and Dees: Transgender Identity and Female Same-Sex Relationships in Thailand	Monograph
2005	Tom Boellstorff	The Gay Archipelago: Sexuality and Nation in Indonesia	Monograph
2006	Tanya Erzen	Straight to Jesus: Sexual and Christian Conversions in the Ex-Gay Movement	Monograph
2007	Saskia Wieringa, Evelyn Blackwood, and Abha Bhaiya	Women’s Sexualities and Masculinities in a Globalizing Asia	Edited Volume
2007	Gloria Wekker	The Politics of Passion: Women’s Sexual Culture in the Afro-Surinamese Diaspora	Monograph
2007	David Valentine	Imagining Transgender: An Ethnography of a Category	Monograph
2008	Barbara L. Voss	The Archaeology of Ethnogenesis: Race and Sexuality in Colonial San Francisco	Monograph
2008	Mark Padilla	Caribbean Pleasure Industry: Tourism, Sexuality, and AIDS in the Dominican Republic	Monograph
2009	Ellen Lewin and William L. Leap	Out in Public: Reinventing Lesbian/Gay Anthropology in a Globalizing World	Edited Volume
2009	Mary L. Gray	Out in the Country: Youth, Media, and Queer Visibility in Rural America	Monograph
2009	Rudolf Pell Gaudio	Allah Made Us: Sexual Outlaws in an Islamic City	Monograph
2010	David A. B. Murray	Homophobias: Lust and Loathing Across Time and Space	Edited Volume
2010	Ellen Lewin	Gay Fatherhood: Narratives of Family and Citizenship in America	Monograph
2010	Deborah Gould	Moving Politics: Emotion and ACT UP’s Fight Against AIDS	Monograph
2011	Peter A. Jackson	Queer Bangkok: 21st Century Markets, Media, and Rights	Edited Volume
2011	Roger Lancaster	Sex Panic and the Punitive State	Monograph
2011	Evelyn Blackwood	Falling into the Lesbi World: Desire and Difference in Indonesia	Monograph
2012	Gayle Rubin	Deviations: A Gayle Rubin Reader	Edited Volume
2012	Margot Weiss	Techniques of Pleasure: BDSM and the Circuits of Sexuality	Monograph
2013	Susan Stryker and Aren Aizura	The Transgender Studies Reader 2	Edited Volume
2013	Naisargi Dave	Queer Activism in India: A Story in the Anthropology of Ethics	Monograph
2014	Lal Zimman, Jenny Davis, and Joshua Raclaw	Queer Excursions: Retheorizing Binaries in Language, Gender, and Sexuality	Edited Volume
2014	Noelle M. Stout	After Love: Queer Intimacy and Erotic Economies in Post-Soviety Cuba	Monograph
2015	Linda Rae Bennett, Sharyn Graham Davies	Sex and Sexualities in Contemporary Indonesia: Sexual Politics, Health, Diversity and Representations	Edited Volume
2015	Lucinda Ramberg	Given to the Goddess: South Indian Devadasis and the Sexuality of Religion	Monograph
2016	Uriel Quesada, Letitia Gomez, Salvador Vidal-Ortiz	Queer Brown Voices: Personal Narratives of Latina/o LGBT Activism	Edited Volume
2016	David A. B. Murray	Real Queer? Sexual Orientation and Gender Identity Refugees in the Canadian Refugee Apparatus	Monograph
2017	Eric Plemons	The Look of a Woman: Facial Feminization Surgery and the Aims of Trans- Medicine	Monograph
2018	George Paul Meiu	Ethno-erotic Economies: Sexuality, Money and Belonging in Kenya	Monograph
2019	Amy Brainer	Queer Kinship and Family Change in Taiwan	Monograph
2020	Ana-Maurine Lara	Queer Freedom: Black Sovereignty	Monograph
2020	Sarah Luna	Love in the Drug War: Selling Sex & Finding Jesus on the Mexico US Border	Monograph
2021	Vaibhav Saria	Hijras, Lovers, Brothers: Surviving Sex and Poverty in Rural India	Monograph
2022	Serena Owusua Dankwa	Knowing Women: Same-Sex Intimacy, Gender, and Identity in Postcolonial Ghana	Monograph
2023	Omar Kasmani	Queer Companions: Religion, Public Intimacy, and Saintly Affects in Pakistan	Monograph
2024	Aslı Zengin	Violent Intimacies: The Trans Everyday and the Making of an Urban World	Monograph
2025	Tamar R. Shirinian	Survival of a Perverse Nation: Morality and Queer Possibility in Armenia	Monograph

== See also ==
- List of anthropology awards
- List of LGBTQ literary awards
