= Erzen (disambiguation) =

The Erzen is a river in central Albania.

Erzen may also refer to:

- Eržen, a Slovene surname
- Tanya Erzen (born 1972), an American academic
