= List of anthropology awards =

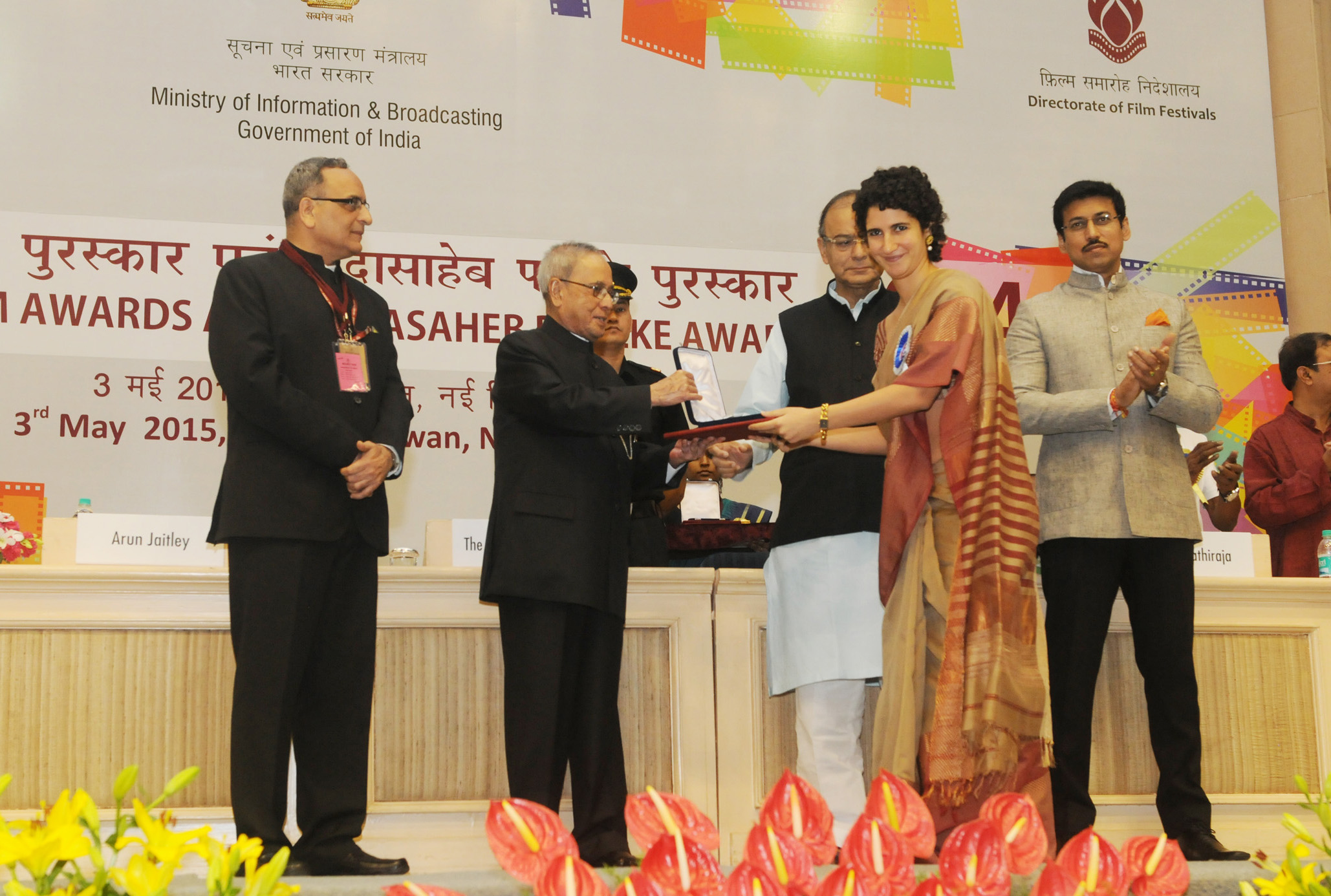
Pranab Mukherjee presenting the Rajat Kamal Award for Best Anthropological / Ethnographic Film on May 03, 2015

This list of anthropology awards is an index to articles about notable awards given for contributions to anthropology, the scientific study of humans, human behavior and societies in the past and present. The list gives the country of the sponsoring organization, but awards may be given to people from other countries.

== Awards ==
Country	Award	Sponsor	Notes
Australia	Nadel Essay Prize	Asia Pacific Journal of Anthropology, Australian National University	Excellence in ethnographic writing relating to the Asia Pacific region, including Australia
Guatemala	Orden del Pop	Museo Popol Vuh	Individuals who have made significant contributions towards the protection, study and research of Guatemala's cultural heritage
Sweden	Anders Retzius medal	Swedish Society for Anthropology and Geography	Geographer or anthropologist. Renamed the SSAG medal
Spain, Portugal and America	AIBR Award	AIBR. Asociación de Antropólogos Iberoamericanos en Red	Best annual article in Iberoamerican Anthropology.
United Kingdom	Huxley Memorial Medal	Royal Anthropological Institute of Great Britain and Ireland	Identify and acknowledge the work of scientists, British or foreign, distinguished in any field of anthropological research
United Kingdom	Rivers Memorial Medal	Royal Anthropological Institute of Great Britain and Ireland	Significant contribution to social, physical or cultural anthropology or archaeology
United States	Bronislaw Malinowski Award	Society for Applied Anthropology	Social scientist for lifetime efforts to understand and serve the needs of the world's societies, and trying to solve human problems using the concepts and tools of social science
United States	Margaret Mead Award	Society for Applied Anthropology, American Anthropological Association	Younger scholar for a particular accomplishment such as a book, film, monograph, or service, which interprets anthropological data and principles in ways that make them meaningful and accessible to a broadly concerned public
United States	Sol Tax Distinguished Service Award	Society for Applied Anthropology	A member of the Society for Applied Anthropology, in recognition of long-term and truly distinguished service
United States	Michelle Rosaldo Book Prize	The Association for Feminist Anthropology	First book by an author that makes a significant contribution to feminist anthropology
United States	Rudolf Virchow Award	Society for Medical Anthropology	Paper written in the spirit of Rudolf Virchow that best reflects, extends or advances critical perspectives in medical anthropology
United States	Ruth Benedict Prize	American Anthropological Association	Excellence in a scholarly book written from an anthropological perspective about a lesbian, gay, bisexual, or transgender topic
United States	Stirling Prize in Psychological Anthropology	Society for Psychological Anthropology	Awarded to a previously published work (article or book, in alternate years) that makes an outstanding contribution to any area of psychological anthropology.
United States	Viking Fund Medal	Wenner-Gren Foundation for Anthropological Research	Distinguishing research or publication in the field of Anthropology

== See also ==
- Lists of awards
- List of social sciences awards
- Lists of humanities awards

== Sources ==
- "Tidigare medaljörer" (PDF) (in Swedish). Swedish Society for Anthropology and Geography. August 2018.
