= Sex Panic and the Punitive State =

2011 book

- Author: Roger Lancaster
- Genre: Nonfiction
- Publisher: University of California Press
- Publication date: 2011
- Pages: 322
- Award: Ruth Benedict Prize
- ISBN: 978-0520262065

Sex Panic and the Punitive State is a 2011 history book by American anthropologist Roger N. Lancaster. The book examines how moral panics related to sexual crimes in the United States since the 1960s have led to an increasingly punitive approach by the U.S. government regarding sexual offenses and fueled a "culture of fear" and paranoia in American society. The book won a 2011 Ruth Benedict Prize.

Lancaster states in the book that sex-related moral panics in the United States have been historically directed toward African Americans, gay men, queer people, and nonwhite populations in general, despite the fact that most sexual perpetrators are white and heterosexual. He also describes the popular racialized view of sex crimes in contemporary society as being more focused on pedophilic white men, who are often perceived by society as being homosexual. He describes such moral panics as being historically fueled by both American conservatives and liberals. Throughout the book, Lancaster goes through historical periods of sex scandals including the Progressive and Jim Crow eras, Joseph McCarthy's persecution of homosexuals, the satanic panic and the AIDS hysteria.

The book further examines the increase of punitive measures taken against people labeled as sex offenders, a label that includes people convicted of minor and nonsexual crimes (such as public urination), which have encompassed increasingly long prison sentences followed by mandatory registration on sex offender registries. Lancaster stated that this shift toward permanent surveillance was based on the unproven notion that sex offenders will inevitably recidivate. Lancaster compares the U.S. government's punitiveness with the approaches taken by European countries.
