= Kath Weston =

American anthropologist, author and academic

- Born: 2 November 1958 (age 67); Illinois, U.S.
- Occupations: Anthropologist, professor
- Awards: Ruth Benedict Prize, Michelle Rosaldo Book Prize, Distinguished Achievement Award, Association for Queer Anthropology

Academic background
- Education: University of Chicago; Stanford University

Academic work
- Discipline: Political Economy; Political Ecology; Gender & sexuality
- Institutions: University of Virginia
- Notable works: Families We Choose: Lesbians, Gays, Kinship

Kath Weston (born 2 November 1958) is an American anthropologist, author and academic. She is a Guggenheim Fellow and has twice received the Ruth Benedict Prize for anthropological works.

== Biography ==
Kath Weston was born in Illinois on 2 November 1958. She studied at the University of Chicago (B.A., 1978; M.A., 1981) and at Stanford University (M.A., 1984; Ph.D., 1988).

She first worked as a fellow at the Center for Advanced Feminist Studies at the University of Minnesota from 1989 to 1990. She was then appointed assistant and later associate professor of anthropology at Arizona State University from 1990 to 1998. She became director of studies on women, gender, and sexuality at Harvard University in 2001. She is currently Professor of Anthropology at the University of Virginia and British Academy Global Professor in the Department of Social Anthropology at the University of Edinburgh.

Weston was appointed a Guggenheim Fellowship in 2011 in the fields of Anthropology and Cultural Studies. Weston, a lesbian, was awarded a Ruth Benedict Prize in 1990 for her monograph Families We Choose: Lesbians, Gays, Kinship, and a second such award in 1997 for her monograph Render Me, Gender Me: Lesbians Talk Sex, Class, Color, Nation, Studmuffins.
