= Merle Greene Robertson =

American Mesoamericanist

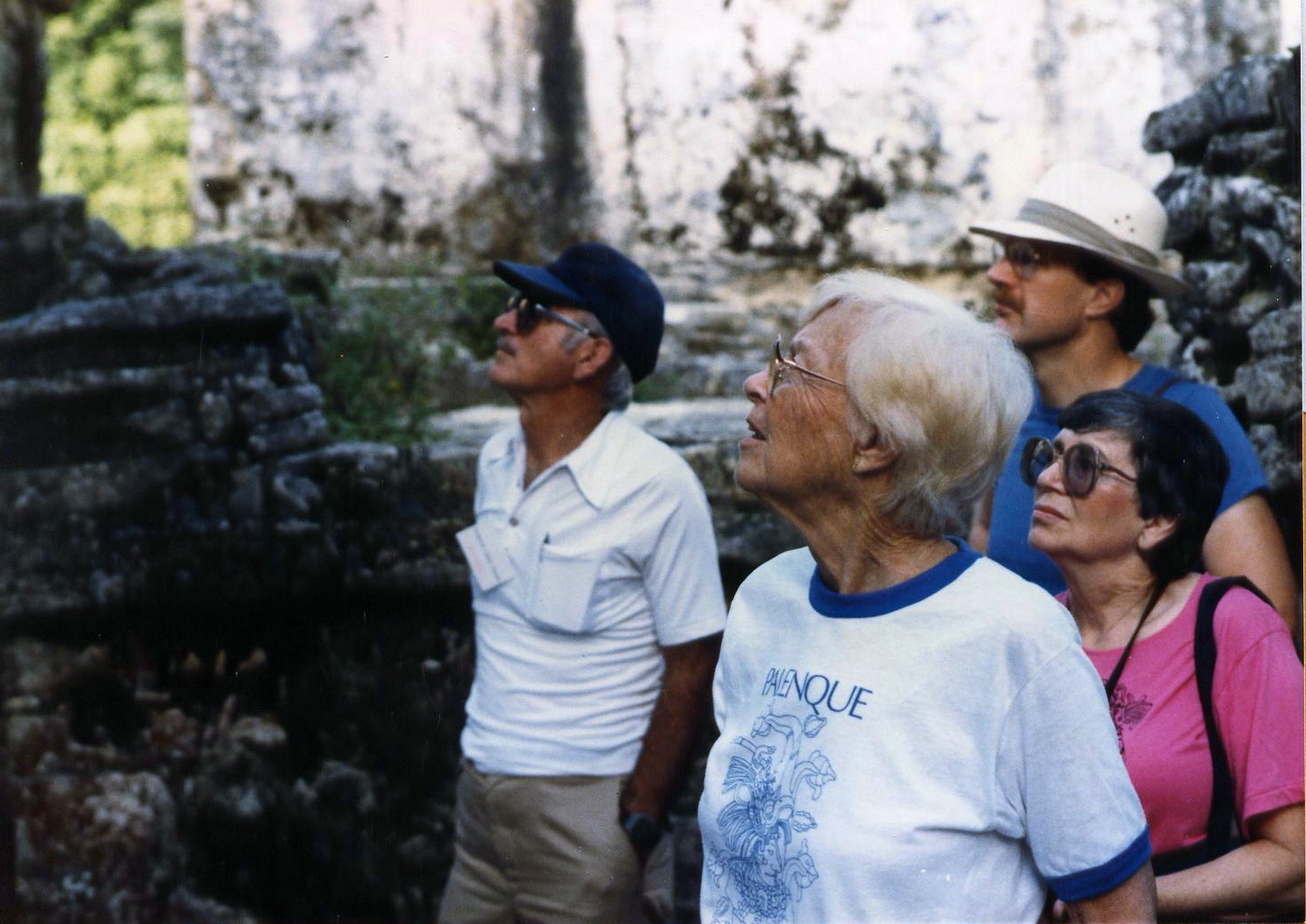
- Merle Greene Robertson (foreground), in 1986 at Palenque, during a Mesa Redonda (Round Table) conference
- Born: August 30, 1913; Miles City, Montana
- Died: April 22, 2011 (aged 97)
- Known for: Painter, art historian
- Spouse: Bob Robertson
- Awards: Orden del Pop; Order of the Aztec Eagle

Merle Greene Robertson (August 30, 1913 – April 22, 2011) was an American artist, art historian, archaeologist, lecturer and Mayanist researcher, renowned for her extensive work towards the investigation and preservation of the art, iconography, and writing of the pre-Columbian Maya civilization of Central America. She is most famous for her rubbings of Maya carved stelae, sculpture, and carved stone, particularly at the Maya sites of Tikal and Palenque. She has received rewards and honors for her work in preserving Mayan cultural heritage.

== Early life and education ==
Robertson was born in 1913 in the small town of Miles City, Montana to Ada Emma Foote and Darrell Irving McCann. She moved to Great Falls, Montana as a small child. Here she became greatly interested in Native American culture and learned Indian sign language from Blackfoot Indian chiefs her father was close friends with. In Great Falls she met the artist Charles M. Russell, who spent many afternoons teaching Merle how to paint. She moved to Seattle, Washington, as a teenager, completed high school there, and attended the University of Washington.

== Adulthood ==
Robertson started working as a commercial artist and gold leaf window painter; during the summers she worked at Camp Tapawingo. Following her graduation, she married her college boyfriend Wallace McNeill Greene. The couple was married for thirteen years and had two children, David and Barbara. However, the marriage dissolved when Robertson found out her husband had been having multiple affairs throughout the years. After the divorce, she and her children moved to California, where she began teaching at San Rafael Military Academy. There, she met Bob Robertson, the dean, who she would later marry. The Robertsons traveled to El Salvador to visit cadets Quiñónez, Escalon, and Sagrera, and learn about Salvadoran archeology. She later decided to go back to school, and moved to San Miguel de Allende, Mexico.

Robertson earned her Master's of Fine Arts from the University of Guanajuato, where she studied watercolors, oils, photography, and mural painting from one of Mexico's top artists, James Pinto. After completing her MFA, she began working on the Tikal Project with the University of Pennsylvania in 1961. She spent three summers drawing the architecture of the Central Acropolis. She also started her famous rubbings at this time, making the art form a way to document and preserve the information on Maya relief sculptures. While she was there, it was suggested that she travel through Guatemala and record stelae at other sites.

While Robertson carved out a path for herself as a Mayanist, she continued to teach school in the states. She and her husband Bob both worked at the Stevenson School in Pebble Beach, California; this is where she first began to instill her love of the Maya into young students. She taught a Mesoamerican Archaeology class and took many of her students on expeditions into the jungles of Central America. Some of her students went on to study archaeology at college and pursue a career studying the Maya, one of the best examples being Mayanist Arlen F. Chase.

== Contribution to Maya studies ==
=== Rubbings ===
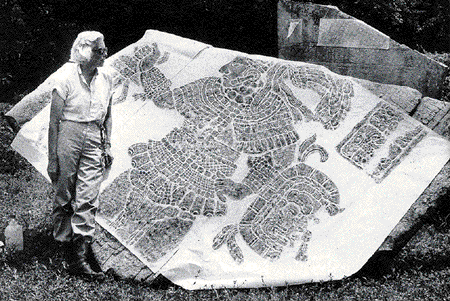
Robertson with her rice rubbing of Stela 1 at Bonampak, Mexico

Initially trained as an artist, Robertson pioneered the technique of taking rubbings from Maya monumental sculptures and inscriptions, making over 4,000 of these over a career spanning four decades (2,000 being monuments). In many cases these rubbings have preserved features of the artworks which have since deteriorated or even disappeared, through the actions of the environment or looters. This method was first used by the ancient Chinese, but Robertson further developed and refined the process. She developed two techniques using two different types of ink on rice paper. The ink was chosen was based on the environmental conditions and the nature of the item being recorded.

Robertson, along with Mayanist Tatiana Proskouriakoff and Edith Ricketson, paved the way for women to enter the field of Maya archaeology. She was the first woman to join the Tikal Project, at a time when women generally did not work on archaeological projects.

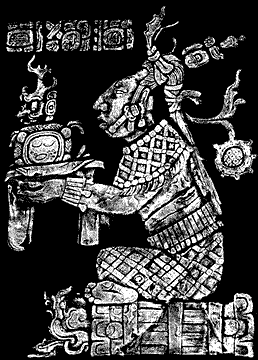
Palace tablet of a ruler or lord at Palenque, rubbing done by Robertson, courtesy of MesoWeb

Robertson is most well known for her work at Palenque. In the 1980s, she undertook a project to document and record in detail all the sculptural art. This led to the instrumentation of the series of Mayanist conferences known as the Palenque Round Tables, which have produced some of the most significant breakthroughs in Maya research and the epigraphic decipherment of the ancient Maya script. The meetings started in December 1973 and ended in June of 1993. A total of 10 of the proceedings of the round table meetings have been published as volumes.

Robertson also worked at Chichen Itza for many years. Here she created a large, encompassing report of all the sculptures at the site. Not only did she record the hieroglyphic and iconographic inscriptions, she also interpreted the work through the eyes of the authors. This showed her unique perspective as an artist rather than a formally trained archaeologist.

In 1982, Robertson founded the Pre-Columbian Art Institute, which publishes the PARI Journal. This non-profit organization supported the research of Mesoamerican art, epigraphy, and iconography, and funded archaeological excavations at Palenque under the Cross Group Project.

In 2004, Robertson received the Orden del Pop Award from Guatemala's Museo Popol Vuh in recognition of her decades of work preserving the country's Maya cultural heritage through her detailed documentation of Maya monuments and hieroglyphic writing. This Instituto de Nacional de Anthropologia e Historia (INAH) also presented her with the Order of the Aztec Eagle and named her Honorary President of the Palenque Round Tables, which have since continued.
