= Orden del Pop =

- Description: Recognition for protection and research of Guatemala's cultural heritage
- Location: Guatemala City, Guatemala
- Presented by: Museo Popol Vuh
- Website: popolvuh.ufm.edu/en/orden-del-pop/

The Orden del Pop (Order of the Mat) is an annual award bestowed by the Museo Popol Vuh at Guatemala's Universidad Francisco Marroquín. Created in 1998, the Orden del Pop recognises "the work of individuals who have made significant contributions towards the protection, study and research of Guatemala's cultural heritage".

== Recipients ==
Source: UFM

Year	Awarded to	Nationality
1998	Guillermo Mata Amado	Guatemala
1999	Ricardo Muñoz Gálvez	Guatemala
2000	Arthur A. Demarest	United States
2001	Ian Graham	United Kingdom
2002	Alain Ichon	France
2003	Federico Fahsen	Guatemala
2004	Merle Greene Robertson	United States
2005	not awarded	
2006	Michael D. Coe	United States
2007	George E. Stuart	United States
2008	Asociación Tikal (institution)	Guatemala
2009	Miguel Orrego Corzo	Guatemala
2010	Marion Popenoe de Hatch	United States
2011	Academia de Geografía e Historia de Guatemala	Guatemala
2012	Richard D. Hansen	United States
2013	Alfredo MacKenney	
2014	Karl Herbert Mayer	
2015	William and Barbara Fash	United States
2016	Bárbara Arroyo	
2017	Carlos Navarrete	
2018	Takeshi Inomata and Daniela Triadan	
2019	Jorge Castañeda Cofiño	
2021	Christopher Lutz	
2022	Oswaldo Chinchilla	
2023	Stephen D. Houston	
2024	Christa Schieber de Lavarreda	
2025	Carlos Chaclán Solís	

== See also ==
- List of history awards
- List of anthropology awards
