= Sexual selection in mammals =

Mode of natural selection

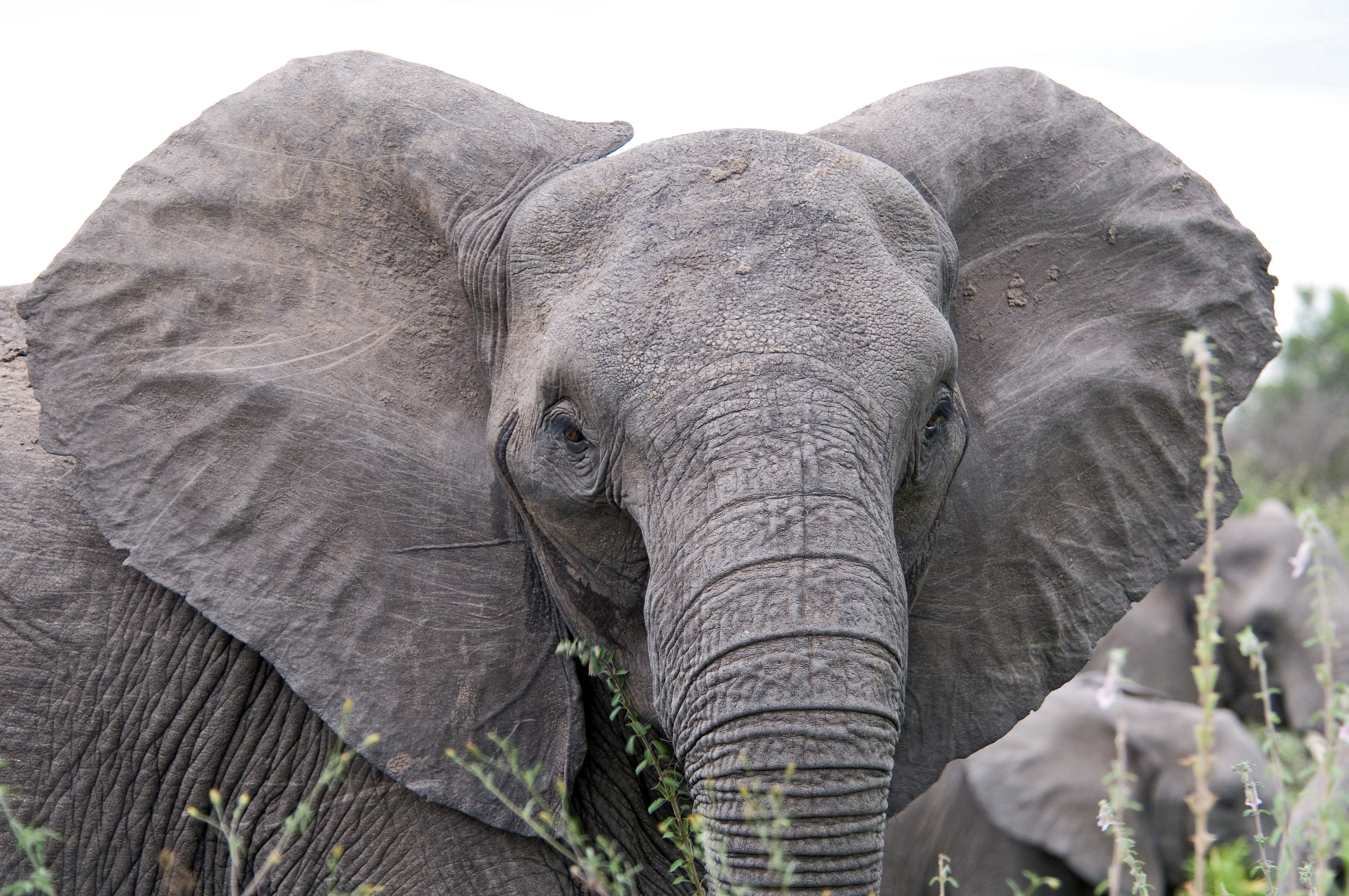
An African bush elephant (Loxodonta africana) with ears extended. Elephants can use their ears as threat displays in male-to-male competition.

Sexual selection in mammals is an evolutionary process where physical and behavioral traits evolve due to an increase in an individual's success in securing mates, an act that is primarily driven by female mate choice and male–male competition. It was first documented by Charles Darwin, who detailed observations of both human and non-human species. This process shapes the evolution of future phenotypes within a population, including sexual dimorphism (physical differences between the sexes), weaponry (such as antlers or tusks), and ornamentation (such as bright, colorful feathers). Precopulatory mechanisms (processes occurring before mating) such as physical combat, acoustic signaling, hormone-mediated traits, polyandry (females mating with multiple males), and sex-role reversal influence which individuals secure mates. Postcopulatory mechanisms (processes occurring after mating) include sperm competition and cryptic female choice.

Extreme examples of intrasexual selection, competition between members of the same sex for mating rights, include elephant seals—where large bulls (males) fight for dominance over breeding harems. In contrast, the evolutionary role of sexual selection in determining other traits, such as the giraffe's long neck, remains debated. Some biologists and anthropologists have also critiqued traditional sexual selection theory for relying on rigid binary sex roles and projecting human cultural values onto non-human species, proposing alternative frameworks such as social selection.

== Elephant seals ==
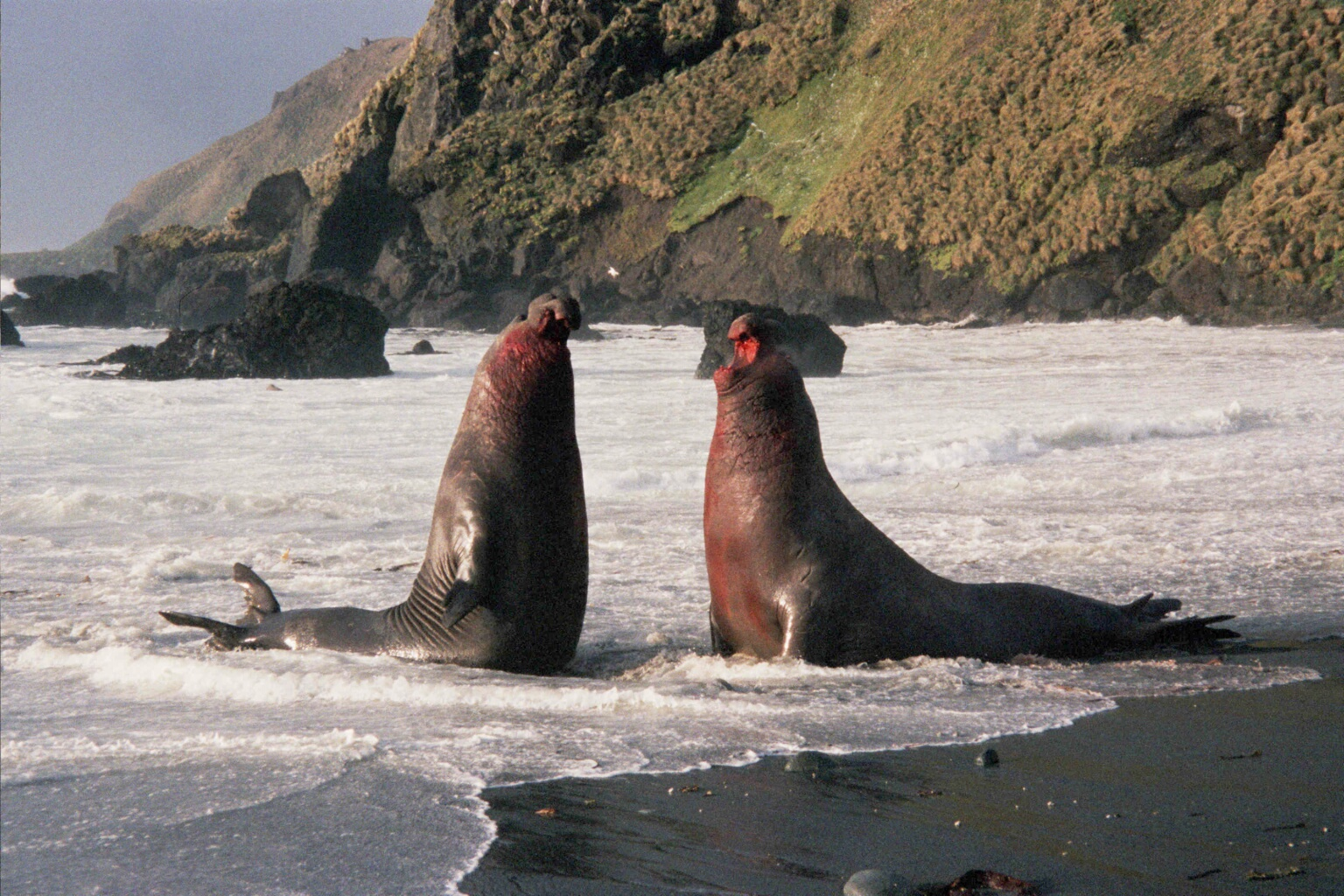
Male southern elephant seals (Mirounga leonina) fighting on Macquarie Island for the right to mate

An example of intrasexual selection, in which males fight for dominance over a harem of females, is the elephant seal – large, oceangoing mammals of the genus Mirounga. There are two species: the northern (M. angustirostris) and southern elephant seal (M. leonina) – the largest carnivoran living today. Both species show extreme sexual dimorphism, possibly the largest of any mammal, with southern males typically five to six times heavier than the females. While the females average 400 to 900 kilograms (880 to 1,980 lb) and 2.6 to 3 metres (8.5 to 9.8 ft) long, the bulls average 2,200 to 4,000 kilograms (4,900 to 8,800 lb) and 4.2 to 5 metres (14 to 16 ft) long. The record-sized bull, shot in Possession Bay, South Georgia, on February 28, 1913, measured 6.85 metres (22.5 ft) long and was estimated to weigh 5,000 kilograms (11,000 lb). The maximum weight of a female is 1,000 kilograms (2,200 lb) with a length of 3.7 metres (12 ft).

Males arrive in the colonies before the females and fight for control of harems. Large body size confers advantages in fighting. The agonistic behaviour of the bulls gives rise to a dominance hierarchy, with access to harems and breeding activity being determined by rank. The dominant bulls or "harem masters" establish harems of several dozen females. The least successful males have no harems, but may try to copulate with a harem male's females when the dominant male is not looking. A dominant male must stay in his territory to defend it, which can mean months without eating, living on his store of blubber. Some males have stayed ashore for more than three months without food. Two fighting males use their weight and canine teeth against each other. The outcome is rarely fatal, and the defeated bull will flee; however, bulls suffer severe tears and cuts. Males commonly vocalize with a coughing roar that serves in both individual recognition and size assessment. Conflicts between high-ranking males are more often resolved with posturing and vocalizing than with physical contact.

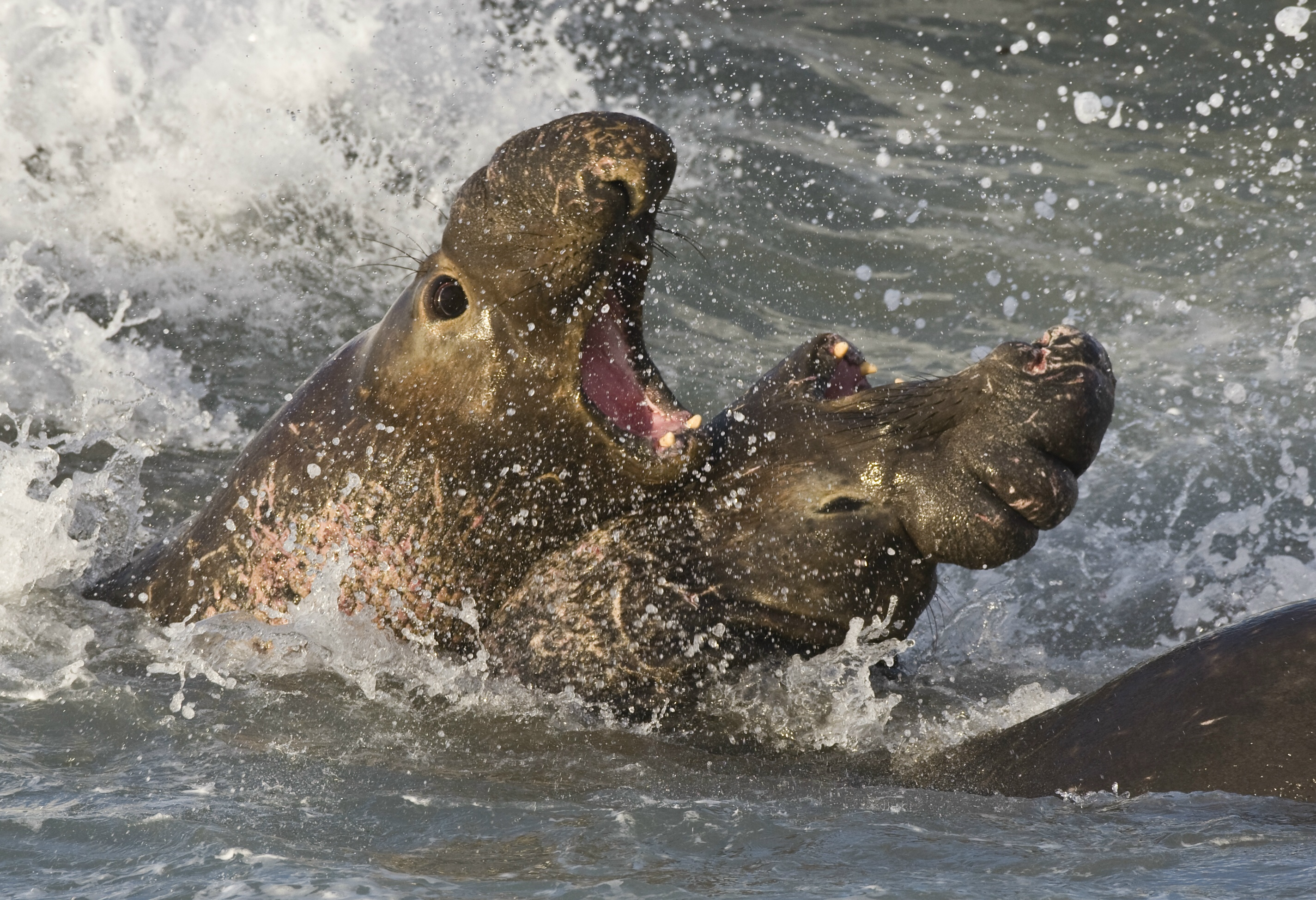
Male northern elephant seals (Mirounga angustirostris) fight fiercely each year. Unsuccessful males may not mate at all, while successful males have harems of 30 to 100 females.

In the case of intrasexual selection, adorned males may gain a reproductive advantage without the intervention of female preference. This advantage will be conferred by weapons used in the process of resolving disputes, such as those over territorial rights. The use of sexual ornamentation as a signaling device to create a dominance hierarchy among males, also known as a pecking order, allows struggle to proceed without excessive injury or fatality. It is predominantly when two opposing males are so closely matched, as would be found in males not having established themselves in a dominance hierarchy, that asymmetries cannot be found and the confrontation escalates to a point where the asymmetries must be proved by aggressive use of ornamentation.

One way to understand how often males will physically engage each other, and in what manner, is by applying game theory, which was developed for biology, most notably by John Maynard Smith.

== An uncertain example: the giraffe ==
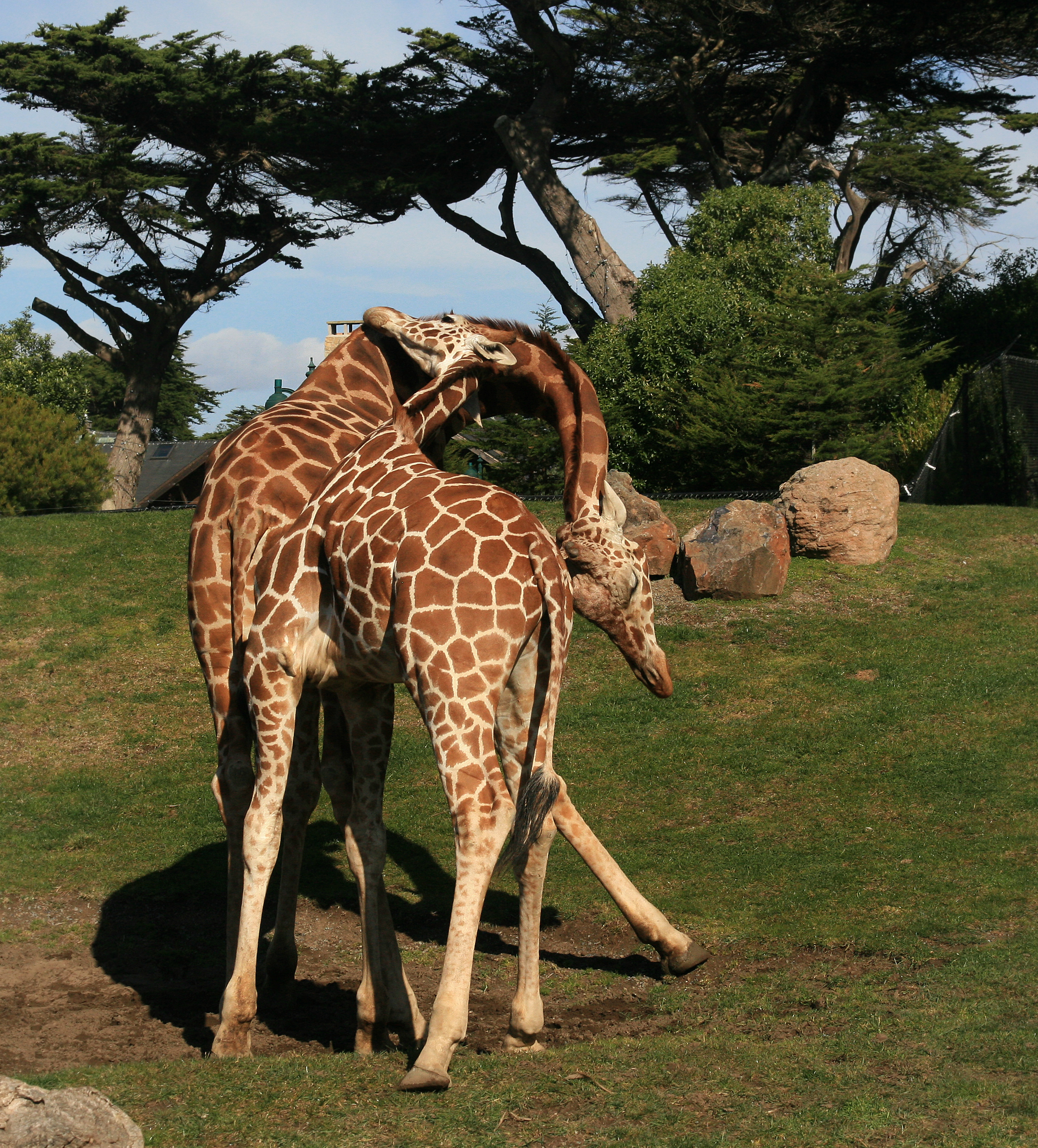
Two male giraffes, (Giraffa camelopardalis reticulata) necking in San Francisco Zoo.

The evolutionary origins of the giraffe's (Giraffa camelopardalis) long neck are controversial. The long-accepted "competing browser's hypothesis" originally put forth by Charles Darwin has been put into question. Originally, scientists believed that the elongation of the giraffe's neck had been a result of natural selection acting in relation to foraging behaviour, where it was supposed that longer necks enabled favoured individuals to gather food inaccessible to other animals. But even though the giraffe's overall height is about 6 meters, it still typically feeds at about 2 meters above the ground. Moreover, the giraffe's kudu, impala, and steenbok competitors do not feed above 2 meters and prefer feeding at shoulder level as well, rather than at the maximum height they could reach.

An alternative explanation for the origin of long necks in giraffe is sexual selection. Male giraffe often neck with other males to exhibit dominance. There are six criteria that need to be satisfied for the exaggerated neck to be classified as a result of sexual selection. The characteristic should be more exaggerated in one of the sexes; it must be used to indicate dominance; have no direct survival benefits; cost the organism in terms of survival or other factors (e.g., energetics); positive allometry should be observed. But evolutionary history shows that increased neck length is not correlated to increases in other parts of the body, which would be expected from foraging selection, so sexual selection may be a more satisfactory explanation. Studies have failed to resolve the causes involved: perhaps the neck was a result of both or other forces.

== Precopulatory mechanisms ==
Precopulatory mechanisms determine who will father an offspring prior to sex. Male–male competition is the biggest precopulatory mechanism in mammals. Sexual dimorphism is a result of male–male competition that is easily seen in species.

=== Male–male competition ===
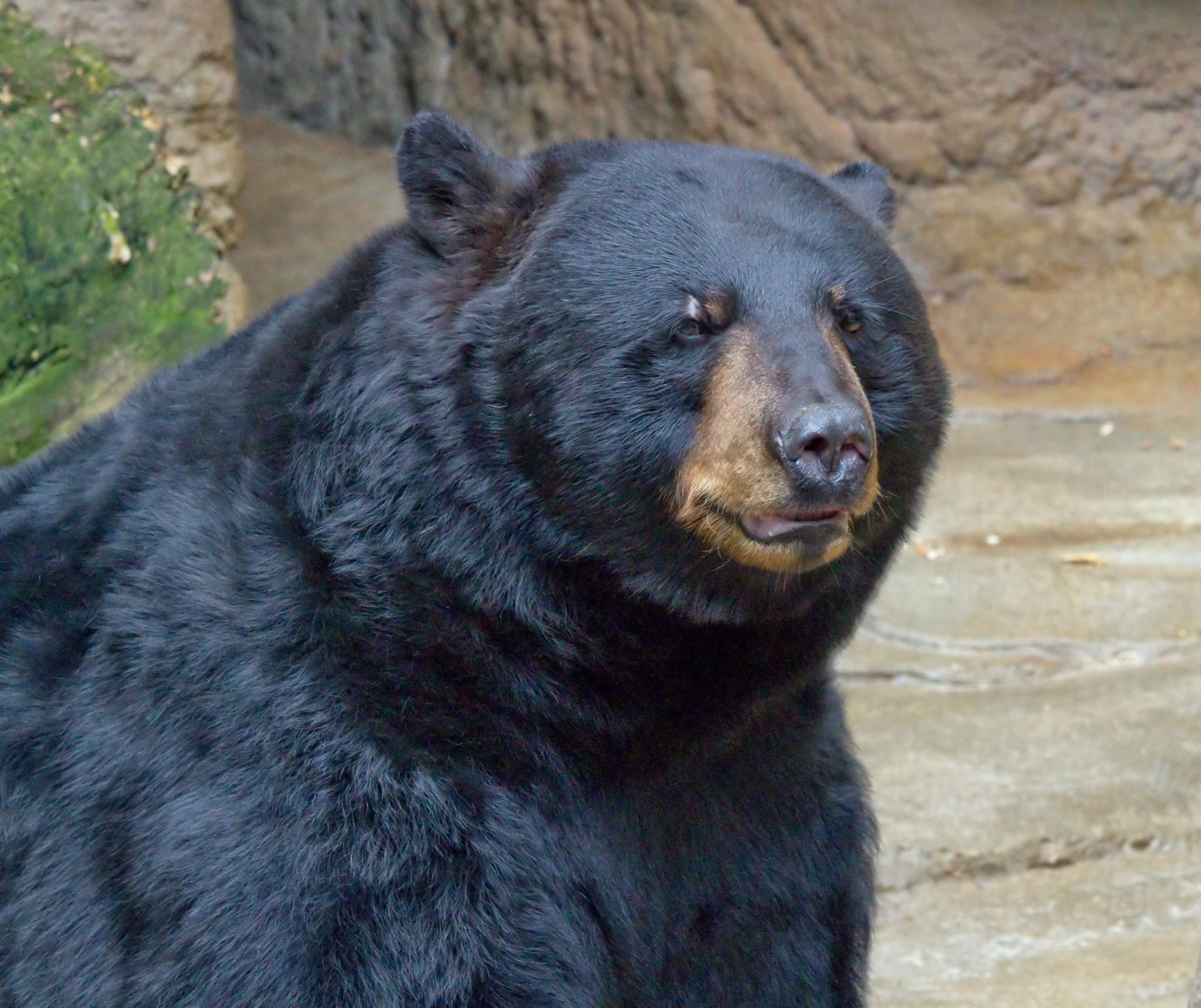
American black bear (Ursus americanus)

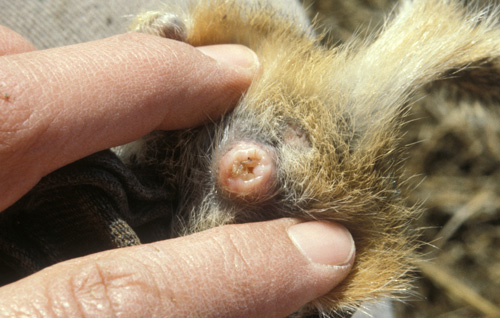
Mating plug of a female Richardson's ground squirrel (Spermophilus richardsonii)

Male–male competition to copulate with the opposite sex is often seen in mammals. African elephants strongly promote male–male competition. Elephants continuously grow throughout their lifetime. As males grow older, they also experience increasing lapses of musth, a violent sexual excitement, and most reproductive success happens to males in musth as it helps them win fights. A fight between a male in musth and one not can result in the death of the latter.

Species with intense male–male competition are known to exhibit the most size dimorphism. For example, female American black bears (Ursus americanus) are 20–40% smaller than males.

Male mammals can compete for harems as well with elephant seals competing fiercely for harems. As mammals reach sexual maturity, secondary sexual characteristic arise. Elephant seals have a proboscis in the adult male, which is used to project loud noises, frequently heard during the mating season. Elephant seals with a bigger proboscis emit lower sounds than males with a smaller proboscis and are the bigger of the males in a colony. Mate-guarding is an important factor in male–male competition to ensure fertilization of an offspring, and, when successful, helps to overlook and court the female. It especially prevents sperm competition from occurring as it ensures reproductive success. This process can be engaged when a post-coital signal is sent to a male to keep guard by the female. Mating plugs are a form of mate-guarding that have proved to show precopulatory female choice. Copulatory plugs are commonly acellular and thought to be made by proteins from the seminal vesicles. DNA taken from copulatory plugs show females deter from mating with close relatives.

=== Callings ===
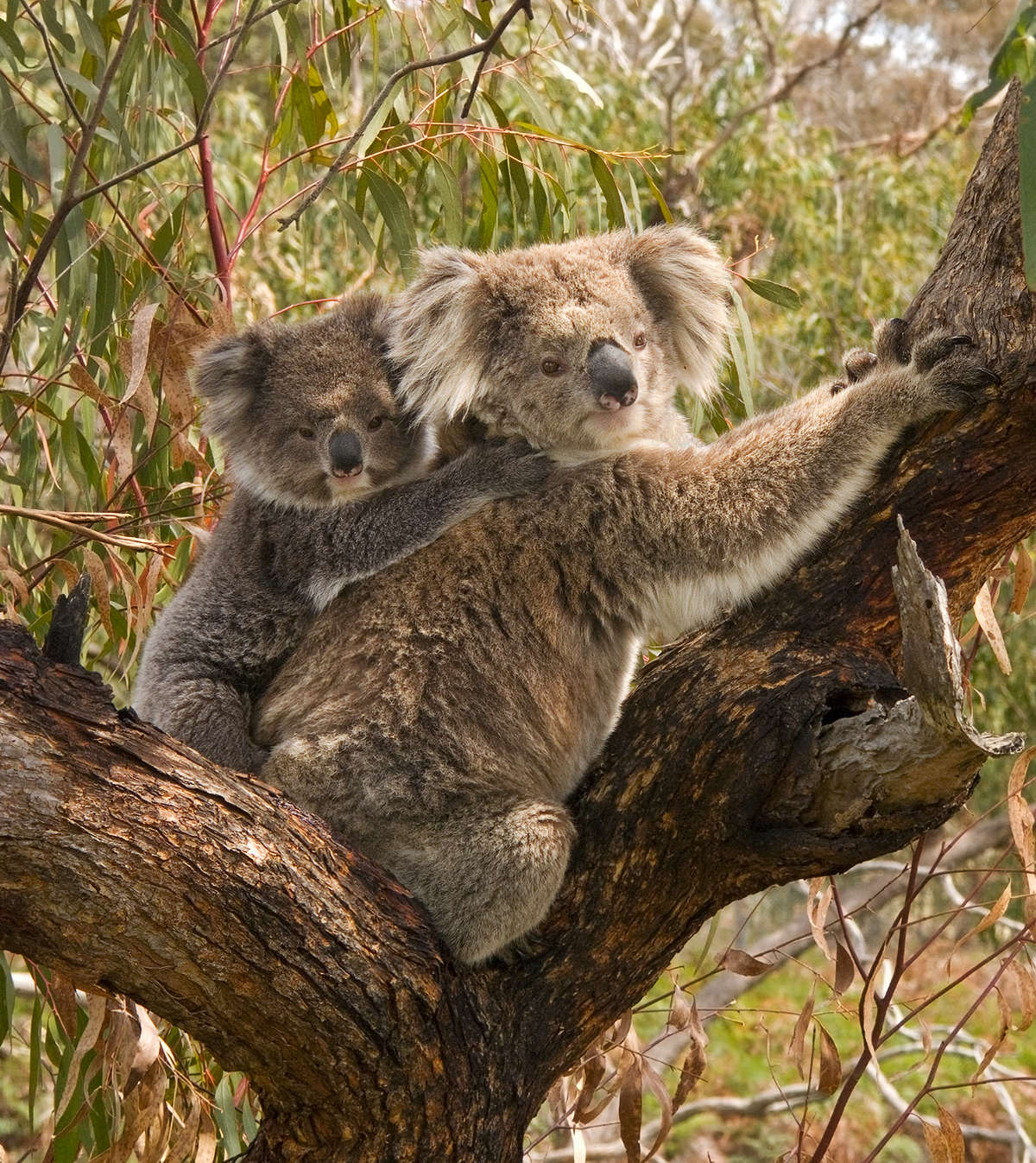
Mother koala with a joey (baby koala) on her back (Phascolarctos cinereus)

During the breeding season, mammals will call out to the opposite sex. Male koalas that are bigger will let out a different sound than smaller koalas. The bigger males which are routinely sought out for are called sires. Females choose sires because of indirect benefits that their offspring could inherit, like larger bodies. Non-sires and females do not vary in their body mass and can reject a male by screaming or hitting him. Male–male competition is rarely exhibited in koalas. Acoustic signaling is a type of call that can be used from a significant distance encoding an organism's location, condition and identity. Sac-winged bats display acoustic signaling, which is often interpreted as songs. When females hear these songs, named a 'whistle', they call onto the males to breed with a screech of their own. This action is termed 'calling of the sexes'. Red deer and spotted hyenas along with other mammals also perform acoustic signaling.

=== Testosterone ===
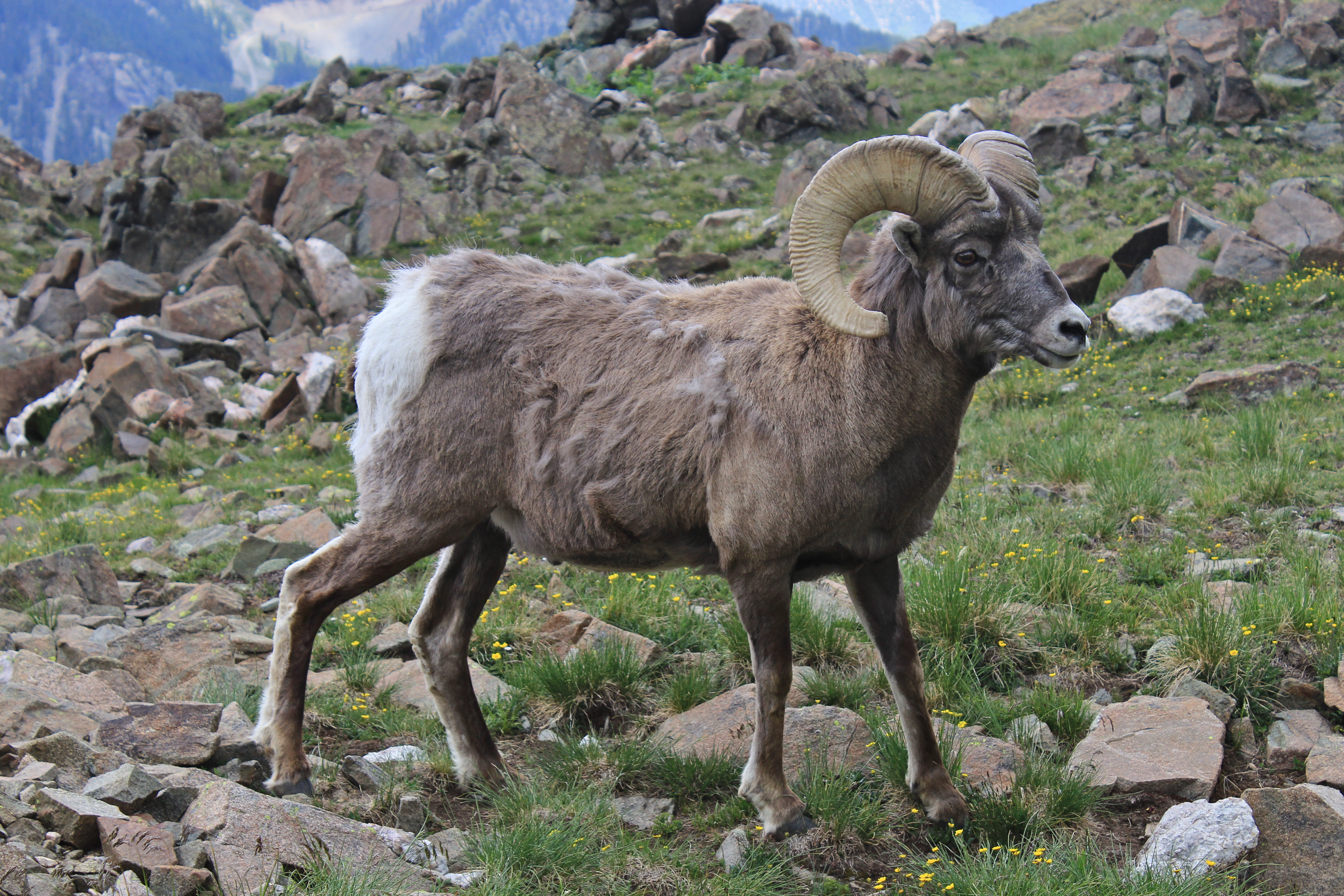
Bighorn sheep ram (Ovis canadensis)

Testosterone is a driving factor towards achieving fertilizing success. Bighorn sheep display curved horns on the rams of the species which are big compared to the small horns displayed on the females of the species. The bigger the horns are, the more testosterone there was found to be in the male. This is important because social rank has a positive correlation with the length of the horns. Social rank leads to tending of a group of females to copulate with. Testosterone also appears more in polygynous species than in monogamous species.

=== Polyandry ===
Polyandrous females have two or more mating partners while they are in heat. Females are more likely to find a new mate when their current male had a high number of paternities the year before or their current male was old. This is presumed to have an effect on offspring and results in more genetic diversity.

=== Sex-role reversal ===
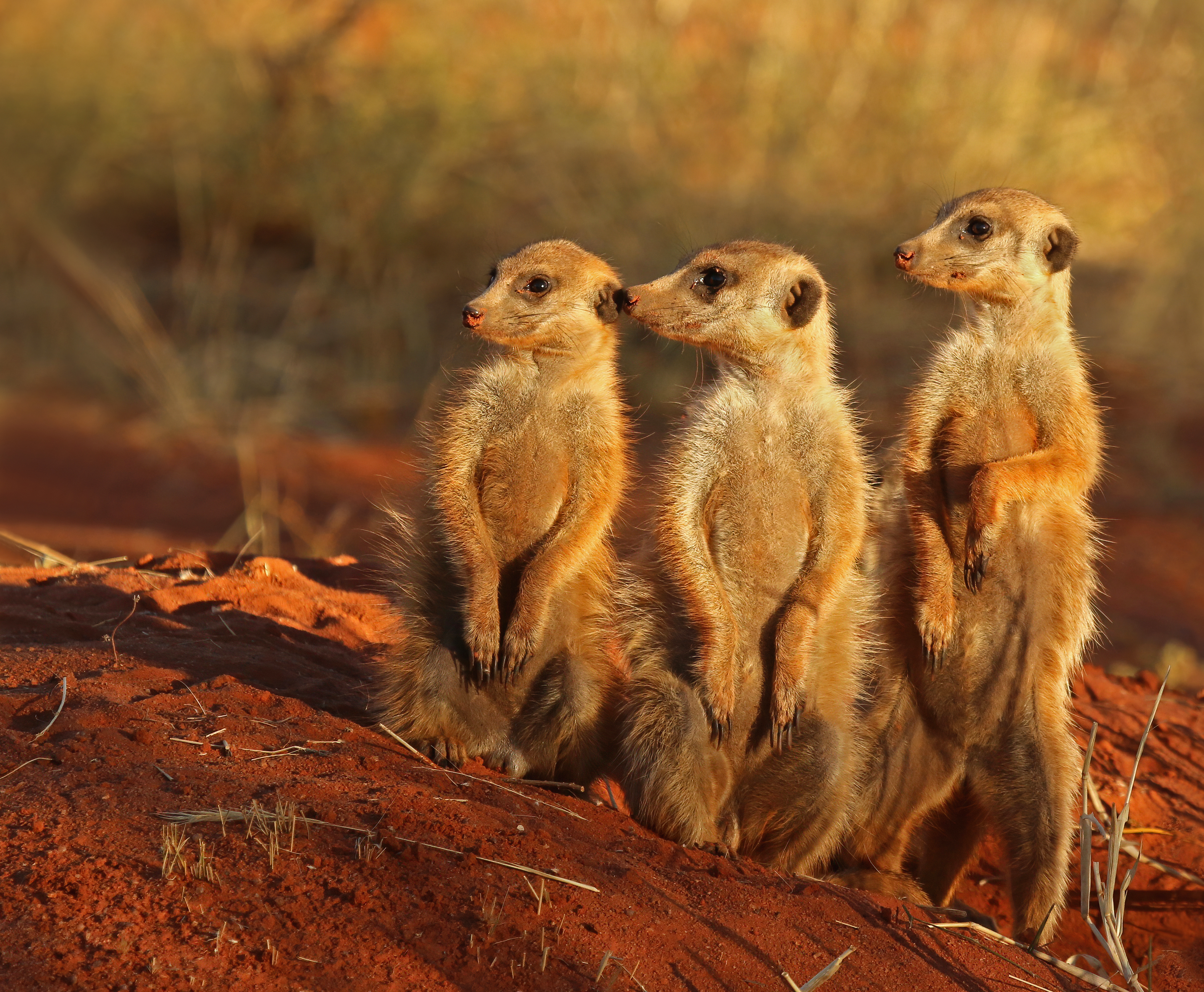
Three meerkats (Suricata suricatta)

Sex role reversal is the change in behavior of a specific species from their ordinary pattern. Sex-role reversal supports sexual dimorphism very strongly. Female–female competition is a common abnormality within animals with accepted sex roles. Females invest into choosing the best possible mate because they have more of a part in bringing up their offspring than males (gestation and lactation). Gestation and lactation are energy-consuming, which means their competition for resources is high. Female–female competitions are observed to gain access for better mates. Meerkat females acquire dominant status because resources for female reproduction are scarce. Dominant females in this species are heavier and win in competitions over other females.

== Postcopulatory mechanisms ==
Copulating with the opposite sex does not ensure fertilization of an egg. Postcopulatory mechanisms include sperm competition and cryptic female choice.

=== Sperm competition ===
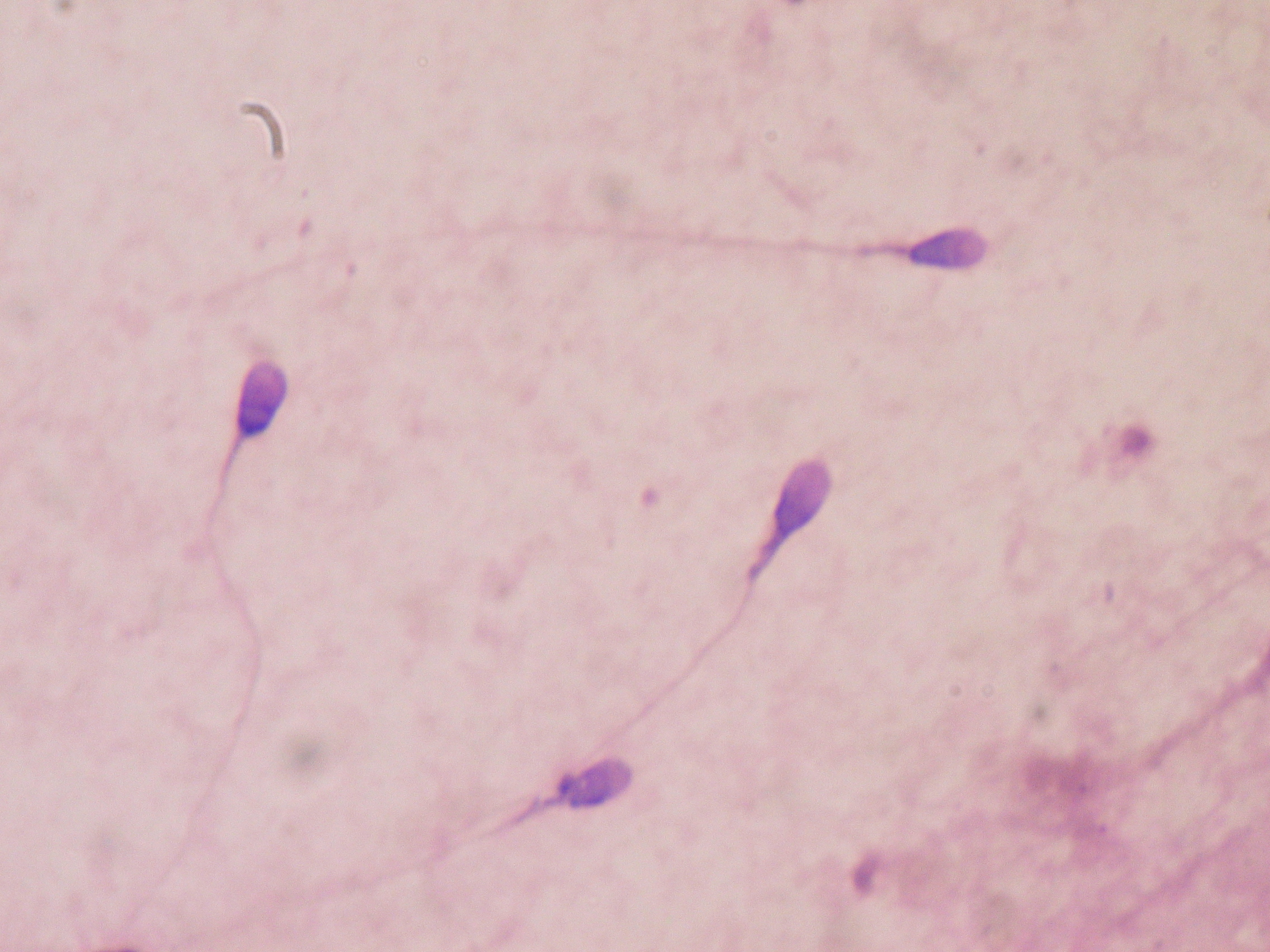
Stained human sperm

Sperm competition involves male gametes trying to fertilize eggs first. As a result of sperm competition, some males in a given species can develop bigger testes and seminal vesicles. Larger midpiece areas in the sperm that contain mitochondria are also observed. Larger testes and bigger midpieces in sperm are seen in males that mate with multiple partners. A female that has been with multiple partners will most likely give birth to an offspring fathered by the male that produced the most or faster sperm. It was found that primates and rodents with longer flagellum fathered more offspring. The length of the baculum is also influenced by sperm competition in some mammal species.

=== Cryptic female choice ===
Cryptic female choice is a postcopulatory mechanism that cannot be observed because it takes place inside a female's body. It enables a female to have some control over who fathers her child even after fertilization.

In some species, females may choose to mate with more than one male to prevent infanticide or harassment. Infanticide can be prevented by confusing the males in a given colony. If the female mates with multiple males, then the males will not know for sure who fathered the offspring. Infanticide can also be prevented by choosing a male that will protect her and the offspring. Sexual harassment may be avoided if females give in to males and copulate when they please.

== Critiques and alternative perspectives ==
Feminist biologists and scholars argue that traditional Darwinian models often project human social constructs onto nature, overlooking a wide diversity of behaviors, ecological contexts, and non-reproductive sexual interactions that exist across species.

Joan Roughgarden asserts that traditional sexual selection theory relies on rigid binary models of biological sex, something that she notes is complex to define, and assumptions that males are universally competitive while females play the part of "coy" and "hard to get". She maintains that this does not account for the diversity of mammalian mating systems, female agency/choice, and non-reproductive sexual or social behaviors. Roughgarden, instead, proposes an alternative framework that involves looking beyond mating and into cooperative and competitive game theory, where animals both contribute to producing the maximum number of surviving offspring.

Similarly, anthropologist Roger N. Lancaster critiques sociobiological and evolutionary psychology narratives for naturalizing human patriarchal hierarchies and nuclear family ideals as universal biological defaults, noting that researchers' interpretations of behavior are reflections of culturally shaped values.
