= Rosaldo =

Rosaldo is a surname. Notable people with the surname include:

- Alessandra Rosaldo (born 1971), Mexican actress, singer, and dancer
- Anthony Rosaldo (born 1994), Filipino singer, actor, host and model
- Michelle Rosaldo (1944–1981), American anthropologist
  - Michelle Rosaldo Book Prize, an award ceremony in honor of her
- Renato Rosaldo (born 1941), American anthropologist
