= Esther Newton =

American cultural anthropologist (born 1940)

- Born: 1940 (age 85–86); New York, New York, U.S.
- Education: University of Michigan (BA); University of Chicago (MA, PhD)
- Occupation: Anthropologist
- Employers: State University of New York; University of Michigan (retired)
- Known for: Anthropological studies of drag queens and ethnographies of the LGBT community

Esther Newton (born 1940, New York City) is an American cultural anthropologist who performed pioneering work on the ethnography of lesbian and gay communities in the United States.

== Career ==
Newton studied history at the University of Michigan and received her Bachelor of Arts with distinction in 1962 before starting graduate work in anthropology at the University of Chicago under David M. Schneider.

Her PhD dissertation, "The drag queens; a study in urban anthropology" (1968), examined the experiences, social interactions, and culture of drag queens. Later published in several articles and as Mother camp: female impersonators in America (1972), Newton's work represented the first major anthropological study of a homosexual community in the United States, and laid some of the groundwork for theorists such as Judith Butler, who would later explore the performative dimensions of sex and gender roles.

Her second book, Cherry Grove, Fire Island: Sixty years in America's first gay and lesbian town (1993), used oral history and ethnographic methods to document the changing dynamics of Cherry Grove, a beach resort on Fire Island, New York, and one of the oldest and most visible predominantly gay communities in the United States.

Newton is Professor Emerita of Anthropology and was the 1998-2000 Kempner Distinguished Research Professor at Purchase College. She was also a professor in Women's Studies and American Culture at the University of Michigan.

== Personal life ==
Newton is a lesbian. She is in a long-term relationship with performance artist Holly Hughes. They married in 2015.

Newton is the daughter of psychotherapist Saul B. Newton.

== Awards ==
- 1994: Ruth Benedict Prize for Cherry Grove, Fire Island: Sixty Years in America's First Gay and Lesbian Town
- 1995: CLAGS Kessler Award
- 2000: Ruth Benedict Prize for Margaret Mead Made Me Gay: Personal Essays, Public Ideas (2000).

== Bibliography ==
- The "Drag Queens": A Study in Urban Anthropology (Thesis). Chicago, Illinois: University of Chicago. 1968. T-17078.
- Mother Camp: Female Impersonators in America. Anthropology of Modern Societies Series. Englewood Cliffs, New Jersey: Prentice-Hall. 1972. ISBN 0136028543. LCCN 76037634.
- Amazon Expedition: a Lesbian Feminist Anthology. Washington, New Jersey: Times Change Press. 1973. ISBN 0878100261. LCCN 73079902. (co-editor)
- Womenfriends: Our Journal. New York, New York: Friends Press. 1976. (co-authored with Shirley Walton)
- "The Mythic Mannish Lesbian: Radclyffe Hall and the New Woman". Signs. 9 (4): 557–575. 1984. doi:10.1086/494087. ISSN 0097-9740. S2CID 144754535.
- "My Best Informant's Dress: The Erotic Equation in Fieldwork". Cultural Anthropology. 8 (1): 3–23. 1993. doi:10.1525/can.1993.8.1.02a00010. ISSN 0886-7356.
- Cherry Grove, Fire Island: Sixty Years in America's First Gay and Lesbian Town. Boston, Massachusetts: Beacon Press. 1993. ISBN 080707926X. LCCN 92043092.
- Margaret Mead Made Me Gay: Personal Essays, Public Ideas. Durham, North Carolina: Duke University Press. 2000. ISBN 978-0822326045. LCCN 00029400.
- "A Hard Left Fist". GLQ: A Journal of Lesbian and Gay Studies. 7 (1): 111–130. 2001. doi:10.1215/10642684-7-1-111. ISSN 1064-2684. S2CID 145329133.
- "Lesbians in the Twentieth Century, 1900-1999". OutHistory. 2008. (Lesbian History project, University of Michigan)
- My Butch Career: A Memoir. Durham, North Carolina: Duke University Press. 2018. ISBN 978-1478001294. LCCN 2018016914.
