= Serena Nanda =

American author and anthropologist

- Born: Serena Young; August 13, 1938 (age 88); New York City, U.S.
- Education: New York University (PhD)
- Occupations: Writer; anthropologist
- Writing career
- Notable awards: Ruth Benedict Prize (1990)

Serena Nanda (née Young; born August 13, 1938) is an American author, anthropologist, and professor emeritus. She received the Ruth Benedict Prize in 1990 for her monograph, Neither Man nor Woman: The Hijras of India.

== Biography ==
Serena Young was born on August 13, 1938, in New York City. She has an identical twin sister called Joan.

Nanda received her Doctor of Philosophy in anthropology from New York University. She is the co-author of two anthropology textbooks: Culture Counts: A Concise Introduction to Cultural Anthropology (5th Edition) and Cultural Anthropology (12th edition). Among her areas of specialty was the topic of gender diversity, having written the major reference book on the hijras of India. As of August 2021, she was a professor emeritus at the John Jay College of Criminal Justice.

== Awards ==
- 1990, Ruth Benedict Prize, Neither Man nor Woman: The Hijras of India

== Selected works ==
- Urban Systems Analysis: An Anthropological Perspective, 1971
- Social honor and informal social relationships : a study of kinship, friendship and neighbor relations in Bombay, India, 1973
- Teaching Nonanthropology Majors, 1979
- Cultural Anthropology. Van Nostrand, New York, New York, 1980, ISBN 0-442-25736-8.
- More Dialogue on the "Bloodthirsty" Semai, 1988
- Neither Man nor Woman. The Hijras of India. Wadsworth, Belmont, California, 1990, ISBN 0-534-12204-3.
- American Cultural Pluralism and Law: An Innovative Interdisciplinary Course, 1990
- Getting away with murder: Cultural diversity and the criminal justice system, 1994
- Trouble in paradise: Native Hawaiians V. The United States of America, 1996
- Goes With Everything, 1999
- Gender Diversity: Crosscultural Variations., 2000, Long Grove, IL: Waveland Press, Inc. ISBN 1-57766-074-9.
- North American Indian Jewelry and Adornment: From Prehistory to the Present , 2002
- Seeing Ourselves as Others See Us: Perceptions and Representations of “the West” by Other Peoples of the World , 2003
- South African Museums and the Creation of a New National Identity, 2004
- with Joan Gregg and Beth Pacheco: 40 Perfect New York Days. Walks and Rambles in and around the City. iUniverse, New York, New York, 2004, ISBN 0-595-29742-0.
- Arranging a marriage in India, 2006
- The gift of a bride : a tale of anthropology, matrimony, and murder, 2009
- Assisted dying : an ethnographic murder mystery on Florida's gold coast, 2011
- Motivating New Students, 2012
- Gender diversity : crosscultural variations, second edition, 2014, Long Grove, Illinois: Waveland Press, Inc. ISBN 978-1-4786-1126-4.
- Culture counts : a concise introduction to cultural anthropology, 2015
- Love and marriage : cultural diversity in a changing world, 2019, Long Grove, Illinois: Waveland Press, Inc. ISBN 978-1-4786-3755-4.
- with J. Michael Ryan: COVID-19: Social Inequalities and Human Possibilities, 2022.
