= Arthur Demarest =

American anthropologist and archaeologist

- Born: Louisiana
- Occupations: Anthropologist and archaeologist
- Known for: Studies of the Maya civilization

Arthur Andrew Demarest is an American anthropologist and archaeologist, known for his studies of the Maya civilization.

== Career ==
Demarest, a Louisiana Cajun, studied Mesoamerican anthropology and archaeology at Tulane University, where he graduated summa cum laude and was awarded the Dean's Medal. Demarest earned his M.A. and doctorate in anthropology and archaeology at Harvard University, he held the endowed Danforth Chair in Archeology, and was elected to the prestigious Harvard Society of Fellows. From 1984 to 1986 he served as assistant professor at Vanderbilt University in Tennessee, US. In 1986 he was promoted to Full Professor and was named to the endowed Centennial Chair. He now holds the endowed chair of Ingram Professor of Anthropology and is the director of Mesoamerican archaeology and development.

== Research contributions ==
Demarest has worked in Mesoamerica for over 35 years, leading archaeological excavations and investigative expeditions every year. He is considered one of the world's leading experts on the Maya, but is also interested in the Olmec, Incas, Aztecs and many aspects of anthropological theory, particularly the collapse of civilizations, the role of religion in ancient societies, and ethics in anthropology. He currently divides his efforts between archaeological excavations and exploration, development programs for indigenous Maya communities, and management of the Vanderbilt-owned, but Maya-managed, Cancuen tropical forest and archaeological park in the Peten region of Guatemala. He is currently director of both the Vanderbilt Cancuen Regional Archaeological project in the Peten forest of Guatemala and the Vanderbilt/Universidad del Valle San Andres Semetabej Regional Archaeology and Development projects in Guatemala's volcanic highlands.

== Legal issues ==
Demarest has been involved in several lawsuits filed by graduate student Brigitte Kovacevich regarding his actions while conducting scientific research in Guatemala. The first of these lawsuits was filed in 2007, and alleged that Demarest "engaged in repeated unprofessional and outrageous conduct that included burning down the field camp, destruction of artifacts, fabrication of a crime scene, the misappropriation and misuse of Vanderbilt University and government funds, threats against students and assaults of students." That suit was settled in 2008. Demarest was again sued in the following year for violating the terms of the previous settlement. Kovacevich alleged that Demarest contacted the University Press of Colorado and claimed that Kovacevich did not have permission from an artist to use certain illustrations in her book, and Demarest also attempted to coerce the artist into withdrawing his consent. That suit was also settled.

== Public education and media ==
In 2010 Science published a profile of Demarest and his work. Demarest's work with the Maya in Mesoamerica has been featured in many TV documentaries by National Geographic, the History Channel, Travel Channel, NBC, CBS, and programs in Brazil and Guatemala. As an authority in the field, Demarest has been interviewed on NPR, CBS, other venues and most recently the PBS Lehrer News hour regarding his research development work, the ancient Maya civilization and the collapse of civilizations.

Demarest himself is the author or editor of over a dozen books and monographs and over a hundred articles and book chapters.

== Awards ==
Demarest has been awarded various prizes for his archaeological and educational work in Guatemala and for his development work assisting contemporary Q'eqchi' contemporary Maya people communities.

In 2000 Demarest was presented with the Orden del Pop, a career leadership award bestowed by Guatemala's Universidad Francisco Marroquín in recognition of his services to Guatemalan archaeology, particularly his training of most of the current Guatemalan leaders in the archaeology of their country.

In 2004 Demarest became the first U.S. citizen to be awarded the Orden Nacional del Patrimonio Cultural de Guatemala. Demarest was presented with that award by the President of Guatemala, Óscar Berger, in a ceremony on November 10 of that year with a citation for his successful battles with looters and his contributions to "the rescue, conservation, and protection of the tangible cultural patrimony of Guatemala."

Demarest was named Distinguished Alumni for 2003 by Tulane University. He has won the Madison-Sarratt Award from Vanderbilt University for outstanding undergraduate teaching in the Arts and Sciences College.

Demarest, his wife, Vilma Lorena Anleu de Demarest and three sons are currently residents in Guatemala and the U.S., and also frequently in Finland, where they collaborate with European museum exhibitions and international indigenous development efforts.
