= Lucinda Ramberg =

American anthropologist

- Occupations: Anthropologist, professor
- Awards: Ruth Benedict Prize, Michelle Rosaldo Book Prize

Academic background
- Education: Bryn Mawr College; Union Theological Seminary; University of California, Berkeley

Academic work
- Discipline: Medical anthropology Sociocultural anthropology
- Institutions: Cornell University
- Notable works: Given to the Goddess: South Indian Devadasis and the Sexuality of Religion

Lucinda Ramberg is an American anthropologist whose work focuses on gender, sexuality, religion and health. She was awarded multiple prizes in 2015 for her first book, Given to the Goddess: South Indian Devadasis and the Sexuality of Religion. Ramberg is associate professor in anthropology and director of graduate studies in the Feminist, Gender, and Sexuality Studies program at Cornell University.

== Biography ==
Ramberg graduated from Bryn Mawr College with a BA in English Literature. She later attended Union Theological Seminary and earned a MA in Theology. Ramberg furthered her studies at the University of California, Berkeley, where she received a PhD in medical anthropology.

Ramberg's work focuses on medical anthropology, religion, sexuality and gender in South Asia. Ramberg was assistant professor at University of Kentucky’s Department of Gender and Women's Studies from 2007 to 2011. From 2009 to 2010, she was visiting assistant professor at the Harvard Divinity School Women's Studies in Religion Program.

Ramberg is currently associate professor in anthropology and director of graduate studies in the Feminist, Gender, and Sexuality Studies program at Cornell University. Her first book, Given to the Goddess: South Indian Devadasis and the Sexuality of Religion (2014) was awarded the 2015 Clifford Geertz Prize in the anthropology of religion, the Michelle Rosaldo Book Prize for a first book in feminist anthropology, and the 2015 Ruth Benedict Prize from the Association for Queer Anthropology.

== Awards ==
- Ruth Benedict Prize, (2015)
- Michelle Rosaldo Book Prize, (2015)
- Geertz Prize in the Anthropology of Religion (2015)

== Selected publications ==
=== Journals ===
- Ramberg, Lucinda (2009). "Magical Hair as Dirt: Ecstatic Bodies and Postcolonial Reform in South India". Culture, Medicine and Psychiatry. 33 (4): 501–522. doi:10.1007/s11013-009-9147-1. PMID 19787445. S2CID 21013767.
- Ramberg, Lucinda (2011). "When the Devi Is Your Husband: Sacred Marriage and Sexual Economy in South India". Feminist Studies. 37 (1): 28–60. doi:10.1353/fem.2011.0014. S2CID 245659380.
- Ramberg, Lucinda (2013). "Troubling Kinship: Sacred Marriage and Gender Configuration in South India". American Ethnologist. 40 (4): 661–675. doi:10.1111/amet.12046.

=== Books ===
- Ramberg, Lucinda (2014). Given to the Goddess: South Indian Devadasis and the Sexuality of Religion. Duke University Press. ISBN 978-0822357100.
- Basu, Srimati; Ramberg, Lucinda (2014). Conjugality Unbound: Sexual Economies, State Regulation and the Marital Form in India. Women Unlimited. ISBN 978-8188965885.
