= Saskia Wieringa =

Dutch sociologist

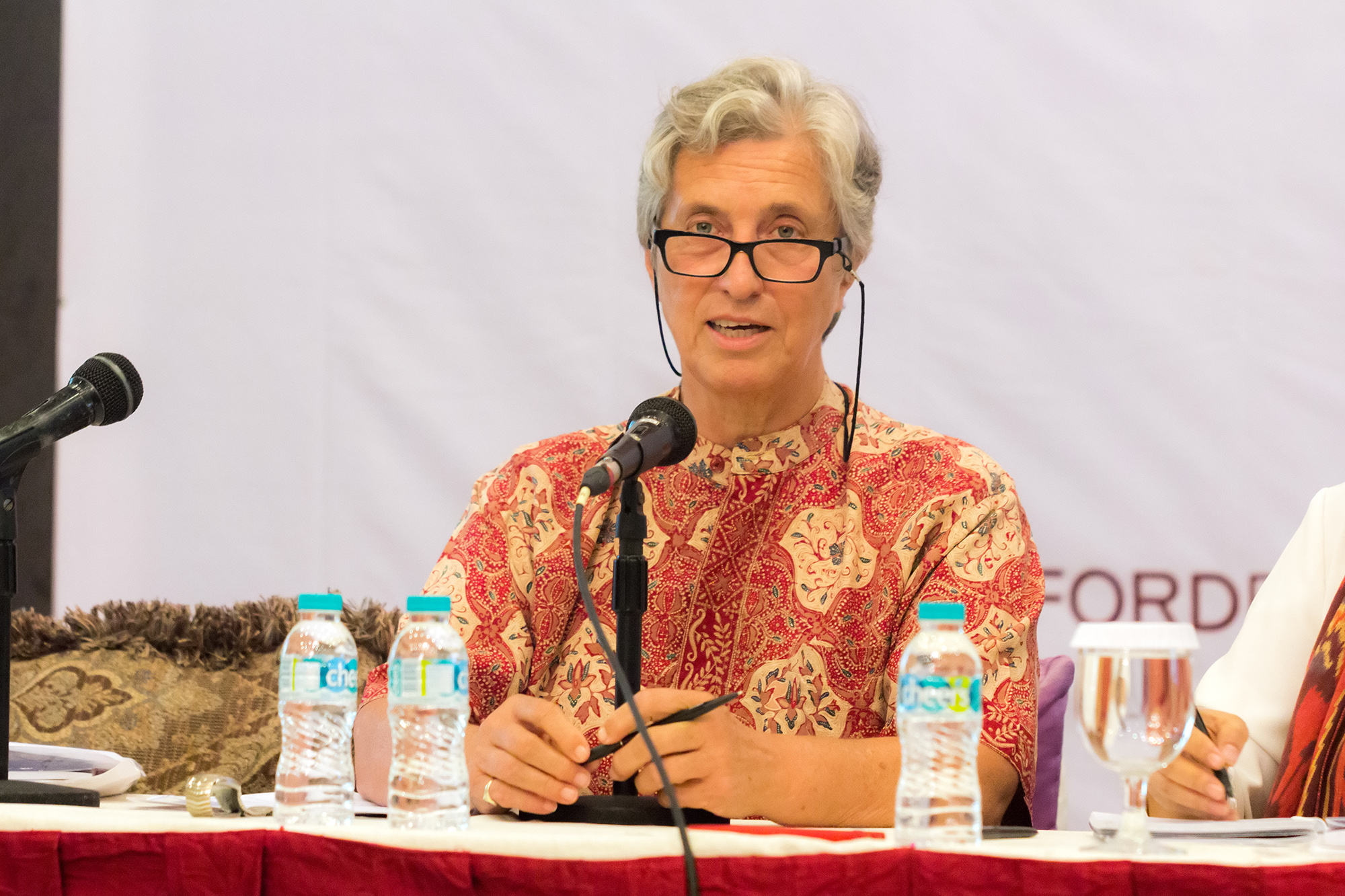
- Wieringa, September 2016
- Born: Saskia Eleonora Wieringa; 1950 (age 75–76)
- Awards: Ruth Benedict Prize

Academic work
- Discipline: Sociology
- Sub-discipline: Gender studies
- Institutions: University of Amsterdam
- Main interests: Gender equality; sexuality studies; women's history

Saskia Eleonora Wieringa (born 1950) is a Dutch sociologist. She is a professor of Gender and Women's Same-Sex Relations Crossculturally at the Faculty of Social and Behavioural Sciences at the University of Amsterdam. The area of study was established by the Foundation for Lesbian and Gay Studies and sponsored by Hivos. From 1 April 2005 to 19 April 2012, she served as the director of Aletta, Institute for Women's History (currently Atria Institute on gender equality and women's history) in Amsterdam.

== Work ==
Wieringa engages in research concerning gender relations, gender indicators, sexual policy and lesbian relationships in Indonesia, Japan and South Africa. She specializes in teaching, research and consults in the fields of human rights, sexuality, culture, cross-cultural lesbian relationships, feminist epistemology (theory of knowledge) and methodology (particularly ethnographic methods and oral history), gender and development theory, policy and planning (especially the development of indicators and monitoring of sexual policy), Women's sexology and HIV/AIDS.

She has taught at various universities, both in the Netherlands and abroad in the field of women's and gender studies and sexuality. She has also been involved in setting up Women's Studies at universities in different countries.

Wieringa is currently the chair of Gender and Women's Same-sex Relations Crossculturally at the University of Amsterdam. "She has published widely on sexual politics in Indonesie, women's empowerment and women's same-sex relations globally. She is presently working on a book on heteronormativity in Asia".

== Publications ==
- Heteronormativity, Passionate Aesthetics and Symbolic Subversion in Asia (2015, Sussex Academic Press)
- Sexual Politics in Indonesia (2002, Palgrave Macmillan)
- Tommy Boys, Lesbian Men and Ancestral Wives (met Ruth Morgan, 2005, Jacana Media South African publisher)
- Engendering Human Security (met anderen, 2007, Zed Books)
- Het Krokodillengat (2007, LaVita Publishing)
- Traveling Heritages. New Perspectives on Collecting, Preserving and Sharing Women’s History (2008, Aksant)

Saskia Wieringa and Evelyn Blackwood have composed two anthologies about lesbian relationships. Both have been awarded literary prizes.

- Female Desires. Same-Sex Relations and Transgender Practices Across Cultures (1999, Columbia University Press)
- Women’s Sexualities and Masculinities in a Globalizing Asia (2005 Palgrave)
