= Queer Kinship and Family Change in Taiwan =

2019 book

- Author: Amy Brainer
- Published: 2019
- Publisher: Rutgers University Press
- Pages: 153
- Awards: Ruth Benedict Prize (2019)
- ISBN: 978-0-8135-9760-7

Queer Kinship and Family Change in Taiwan is an anthropology book by Amy Brainer. The book won the 2019 Ruth Benedict Prize for best monograph.
