= Evelyn Blackwood =

American anthropologist

- Born: October 2, 1950 (age 76)
- Occupation: Anthropologist
- Awards: Ruth Benedict Prize, Fulbright grant

Academic background
- Education: King's College, Briarcliffe; San Francisco State University; Stanford University

Academic work
- Discipline: Gender, sexuality, kinship, identity
- Notable works: Falling into the Lesbi World: Desire and Difference in Indonesia, (2010)

Evelyn Blackwood (born October 2, 1950) is an American anthropologist whose research focuses on gender, sexuality, identity, and kinship. She was awarded the Ruth Benedict Prize in 1999, 2007 and 2011. Blackwood is an emerita professor of anthropology at Purdue University.

== Biography ==
Blackwood graduated from The King's College, New York with a BA in psychology. She earned an MA in anthropology at San Francisco State University, and a PhD from Stanford University in 1993. Blackwood was an assistant professor at Purdue University from 1994 to 2000, associate professor from 2000 to 2010 and professor from 2010 to 2017. She is currently an emerita professor at the university. Blackwood, a lesbian, works on gender, sexuality, identity and kinship as it relates to different cultural societies in West Sumatra, Indonesia and the United States.

Blackwood was the recipient of a Fulbright Senior Scholarship in 2001 and a 2007 Martin Duberman Fellowship (Center for Lesbian and Gay Studies, City University of New York) for her research on sexuality and identity in Indonesia and Southeast Asia. The research resulted in several publications, including the monograph, Falling into the Lesbi World: Desire and Difference in Indonesia (2010) which won the 2011 Ruth Benedict Prize."

Her current research combines anthropology and history to "explore the construction and negotiation of identity, selfhood, and sexuality among baby boomers in the U.S., focusing on women in the first generation of 'out' lesbians in the San Francisco Bay Area in the 1970s."

== Awards ==
- Ruth Benedict Prize, Female Desires: Same Sex Relations and Transgender Practices Across Cultures, (1999)
- Fulbright Senior Scholarship, (2001)
- Martin Duberman Fellowship, (2007)
- Ruth Benedict Prize, co-editor, Women’s Sexualities and Masculinities in a Globalizing Asia, (2007)
- Ruth Benedict Prize, Falling into the Lesbi World: Desire and Difference in Indonesia, (2011),

== Selected publications ==
=== Journals ===
- Blackwood, Evelyn (1998). "Tombois in West Sumatra: Constructing Masculinity and Erotic Desire". Cultural Anthropology. 64 (4): 491–521. doi:10.1525/can.1998.13.4.491. JSTOR 656570.
- Blackwood, Evelyn (2005). "Gender Transgression in Colonial and Postcolonial Indonesia". The Journal of Asian Studies. 64 (4): 849–879. doi:10.1017/S0021911805002251. JSTOR 25075902. S2CID 162771344.
- Blackwood, Evelyn (2005). "Wedding Bell Blues: Marriage, Missing Men, and Matrifocal Follies". American Ethnologist. 32 (1): 3–19. doi:10.1525/ae.2005.32.1.3. JSTOR 3805140.
- Blackwood, E. (2007). "Regulation of sexuality in Indonesian discourse: Normative gender, criminal law and shifting strategies of control". Culture, Health & Sexuality. 9 (3): 293–307. doi:10.1080/13691050601120589. PMID 17457732. S2CID 11761085.
- Blackwood, Evelyn (2009). "Trans identities and contingent masculinities: Being tombois in everyday practice". Feminist Studies. 35 (3): 454–480. JSTOR 40608385.

=== Books ===
- Webs of Power: Women, Kin, and Community in a Sumatran Village. Rowman & Littlefield Publishing. 2000. ISBN 978-0847699117.
- Falling into the Lesbi World: Desire and Difference in Indonesia. University of Hawaii Press. 2010. ISBN 978-0824834425.

=== Anthologies ===
- Blackwood, Evelyn; Wieringa, Saskia, eds. (1999). Female Desires: Transgender Practices Across Cultures. Columbia University. ISBN 978-0231112604.
- Blackwood, Evelyn; et al., eds. (2007). Women's Sexualities and Masculinities in a Globalizing Asia (Comparative Feminist Studies). Palgrave Macmillan. ISBN 978-1403977687.
- Blackwood (2017). Blackwood, Evelyn; Stockard, Janice E. (eds.). Cultural Anthropology: Mapping Cultures across Time and Space. San Francisco: Wadsworth Publishing. ISBN 978-1305863026.
