= Saul B. Newton =

Cult leader and controversial psychotherapist

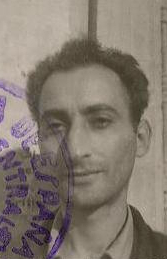
Newton c. 1937–1938

Saul B. Newton (June 25, 1906 – December 21, 1991) was a controversial Canadian-American psychotherapist who led an unorthodox therapy group in New York City. It had no formal name, but outsiders called its members "Sullivanians" or "The Fourth Wall."

== Background ==
Newton's original family name was Cohen. He was born in Saint John, New Brunswick, and attended the University of Wisconsin.

== Career ==
Newton went on to Chicago, where he associated with radical circles at the University of Chicago, becoming a communist and anti-fascist. He served with the Mackenzie–Papineau Battalion of the Abraham Lincoln Brigade in the Spanish Civil War (as Saul Bernard Cohen). In 1943 he was drafted into the U.S. Army and fought in World War II. He went on to study psychotherapy after the war. Newton retained a dual focus on politics and psychology throughout his life.

In 1957, Newton and his wife, Jane Pearce, founded the Sullivan Institute for Research in Psychoanalysis in New York. They had previously worked at the William Alanson White Institute, but left several years after the death of Harry Stack Sullivan, one of the White Institute's founders. Although Newton and Pearce's institute was named after Sullivan, it is widely seen as having offered an extremely distorted and often abusive version of Sullivan's teaching to better meet Newton's personal whims.

The institute's teachings held that traditional family ties were the root cause of mental illness, and espoused a non-monogamous lifestyle. During the 1960s, an informal community centered on the therapeutic practices of the Institute began to form. (Judy Collins chronicles her time with the Sullivanians in her autobiography, as does Martha Shelley.) At its peak in the late 1970s, this community had several hundred members (patients and therapists) living on the Upper West Side. The group gained some notoriety, not only for its non-monogamous lifestyle, but because patients were often encouraged to sever ties with their families.

Since his death, many of his female patients and colleagues have said that Newton took advantage of them sexually. Several children born into the group have come forward about the abuse and neglect Newton's psychological theories caused.

A major project was the Fourth Wall Repertory Company (or Fourth Wall Political Theater), which performed from roughly 1976 to 1991. It was based in New York's East Village. Newton was a board member and performed in several productions. He was also a producer of several documentaries directed by Joan Harvey, his fifth wife, an actress and psychoanalyst.

Membership declined in the late 1980s when the group was subject to unfavorable publicity, investigations into alleged professional misconduct by its therapists, high-profile child custody cases, and organized opposition by disaffected former members who called the group a "psychotherapy cult".

Newton was married and divorced six times and had ten children, among them cultural anthropologist Esther Newton.

His son, Keith Newton, and filmmaker Luke Meyer made a four-part docuseries about the group, The Fourth Wall. The first episode premiered at the 2023 Tribeca Film Festival.

Newton died in 1991 from sepsis, following the onset of Alzheimer's disease.

== Works ==
- Conditions of Human Growth (with Jane Pearce). Citadel Press, 1986, ISBN 0-8065-0177-4.
