= Queer Companions =

2022 book

- Author: Omar Kasmani
- Published: 2022 (U.S.)
- Publisher: Duke University Press
- Pages: 224
- Awards: Ruth Benedict Prize (2023)
- ISBN: 978-1-4780-2265-7

Queer Companions: Religion, Public Intimacy, and Saintly Affects in Pakistan is a 2022 enthnographic book by Omar Kasmani, published by Duke University Press. The work profiles six individuals who are ascetic fakirs at the shrine of Lal Shahbaz Qalandar in Shewan, Sindh, Pakistan. Kasmani suggests that these individuals are "queer" in the sense that their lifestyles do not conform to the expected norms of the Pakistani middle class. The individuals' "intimacy" with Lal Shahbaz Qalandar is explored in relation to power structures, including those of the Pakistani state.

Kasmani carried out the ethnographic research which the book is based on between 2009 and 2018.

The book received the 2023 Ruth Benedict Prize.

== Reception ==
The book was received positively. Jessica Vantine Birkenholtz, for Pacific Affairs, called the work "a beautifully written and theoretically innovative ethnography of fakir lives and longing, of public intimacy and futurity". Hafsa Arain wrote in Anthropological Quarterly, "This work dares to look at the parts of South Asian Islam that are rarely afforded scholarly attention, especially as its entanglements with Hinduism, unique ritual elements, and the many varied paths of fakir ascetic lives...under scrutiny from orthopraxic Muslims and...nationalist religious paradigms". Katherine Pratt Ewing wrote in the Journal of Anthropological Research, "it is an important ethnography of South Asian Sufi shrines that engages with key strands of recent anthropological theory"; however, she also noted that Kasmani's use of "queer" in the book's context "is also conceptually confining since it posits a normative world that these fakirs are resisting".
