= Barbara Voss =

American historical archaeologist

- Born: 1967 (age 58–59)
- Occupations: Archaeologist, academic
- Awards: Ruth Benedict Prize

Academic background
- Education: Stanford University; University of California, Berkeley

Academic work
- Discipline: Historical archaeology
- Institutions: Stanford University

Barbara L. Voss (born 1967) is an American historical archaeologist. Her work focuses on cross-cultural encounters, particularly the Spanish colonization of the Americas and Overseas Chinese communities in the 19th century, as well as queer theory in archaeology and gender archaeology. She is an associate professor of anthropology at Stanford University.

== Education ==
Voss graduated with a BA from Stanford University in 1988, where she earned the Michelle Rosaldo Prize for Research in Feminist Anthropology (1987), the Presidential Award for Academic Excellence (1986, 1987), and the Boothe Prize (1986). In 2002, after working as a field archaeologist for some years, she obtained a PhD from the University of California, Berkeley. Her dissertation was entitled The Archaeology of El Presidio de San Francisco: Culture Contact, Gender, and Ethnicity in a Spanish-colonial Military Community.

Since 2001, Voss has taught at Stanford.

== Career ==
During 1987-1996 Voss was employed in cultural resource management, conducting prehistoric and historic archaeological studies and environmental reviews. Voss's early research focused on both the Spanish colonization of the Americas, as well as gender and sexuality studies. In her work on the Spanish-colonial military settlement of El Presidio de San Francisco, Voss showed how the regulation of sex was an important part of Spanish colonization. In 2008, Voss was a recipient of the Ruth Benedict Prize, for her book, The Archaeology of Ethnogenesis: Race and Sexuality in Colonial San Francisco. In 2000, she and Robert Schmidt won the prize for the edited anthology, Archaeologies of Sexuality. The Ruth Benedict is awarded each year by the American Anthropological Association for the best scholarly book written from an anthropological perspective about a lesbian, gay, bisexual, or transgender topic.

Voss's current work focuses on 19th century migration to the United States from southern China. Since 2002, Voss has served as the director of the Market Street Chinatown Archaeology Project, a community archaeology project investigating a historical Overseas Chinese enclave in San Jose, California. She also the Director of Archaeology for a multidisciplinary study, the Chinese Railroad Workers of North America Project.

In her work on Chinatowns, Voss has critiqued a tendency toward Orientalism in previous scholarship, in which Chinese immigrants are seen as always engaged in the a conflict between a 'traditional' East and a 'modern' West. Questioning the stereotype of Chinatowns as insular and traditional, she has argued that this assumption has limited conclusions about these communities to questions of assimilation and acculturation. For Voss, the boundaries between Chinatowns and their surrounding communities have always been fluid, with close interactions between Chinese and non-Chinese residents. Voss has also argued for a transpacific archaeology which traces the global connections between Chinatowns in the Americas, other Overseas Chinese communities, and China.

In March 2021, Voss published a two-article series calling harassment an “epidemic” in archaeology and proposing that public health models could prevent further harassment from occurring.

She is a member of the Editorial Board for American Antiquity.

== Politics ==
In early 2016, Voss established 'Archaeologists for a Just Future', a Facebook-based advocacy group encouraging archaeologists to participate in the presidential campaign. In November 2016, Voss stepped down as a group moderator. The group name was subsequently changed to 'Archaeologists for a Just Future'. The group currently has over 5,900 members.

== Selected publications ==
=== Journals ===
- Voss, Barbara (2021). "Disrupting Cultures of Harassment in Archaeology: Social-Environmental and Trauma-Informed Approaches to Disciplinary Transformation". American Antiquity. 86 (3): 447–464. doi:10.1017/aaq.2021.19.
- Voss, Barbara (2021). "Documenting Cultures of Harassment in Archaeology: A Review and Analysis of Quantitative and Qualitative Research Studies". American Antiquity. 86 (2): 244–260. doi:10.1017/aaq.2020.118.
- Voss, Barbara (2018). "The Archaeology of Precarious Lives: Chinese Railroad Workers in Nineteenth-Century North America". Current Anthropology. 59 (3): 287–313. doi:10.1086/697945. S2CID 149672695.
- Voss, Barbara (2018). "Every element of womanhood with which to make life a curse or blessing": Missionary Women's Accounts of Chinese American Women's Lives in Nineteenth-century Pre-Exclusion California". Journal of Asian American Studies. 21 (1): 105–134. doi:10.1353/jaas.2018.0004. S2CID 148610991.
- Voss, Barbara (2015). "What's new? Rethinking ethnogenesis in the archaeology of colonialism". American Antiquity. 80 (4): 655–670. doi:10.7183/0002-7316.80.4.655. S2CID 164815181.
- Voss, Barbara (2012). "Status and ceramics in Spanish colonial archaeology". Historical Archaeology. 46 (2): 39–54. doi:10.1007/bf03377315. S2CID 160116317.
- Voss, Barbara (2008). "Domesticating imperialism: sexual politics and the archaeology of empire". American Anthropologist. 110 (2): 191–203. doi:10.1111/j.1548-1433.2008.00025.x.
- Voss, Barbara (2000). "Feminisms, queer theories, and the archaeological study of past sexualities". World Archaeologies. 32 (2): 180–192. doi:10.1080/00438240050131171. S2CID 144214580.

=== Books ===
- Voss, Barbara (2015). The Archaeology of Ethnogenesis: Race and Sexuality in Colonial San Francisco. University Press of Florida. p. 432. ISBN 978-0813061252.
- Voss, Barbara; Casella, Eleanor, eds. (2011). The Archaeology of Colonialism: Intimate Encounters and Sexual Effects. Cambridge University Press. p. 368. ISBN 978-1107401266.
- Voss, Barbara; Schmidt, Robert A. (2000). Archaeologies of Sexuality. Routledge. p. 320. ISBN 978-0415223669.
