= Jenny L. Davis =

American linguist and anthropologist

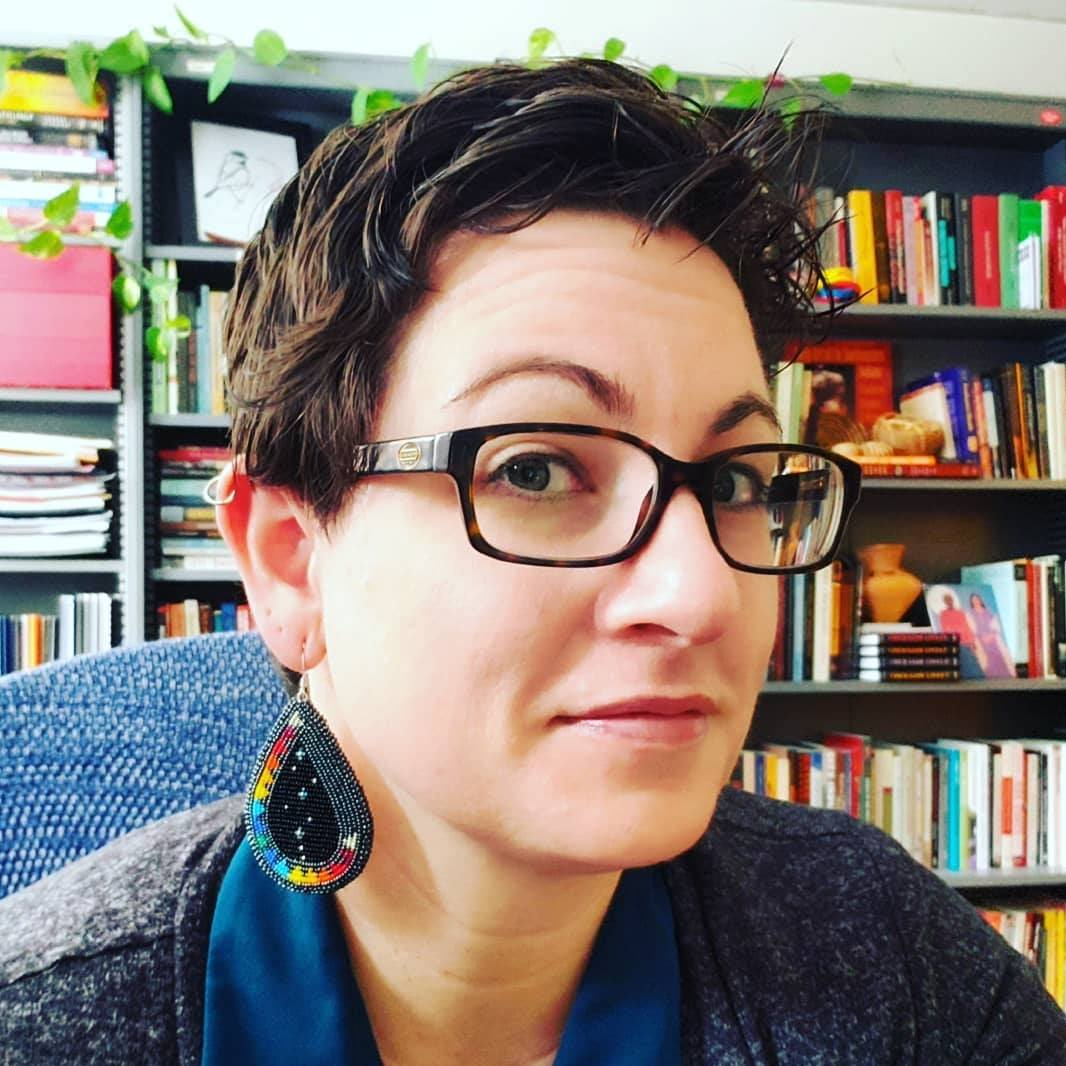
- Davis in 2019

Academic background
- Education: Oklahoma State University (BA, BA); University of Colorado Boulder (MA, PhD)

Academic work
- Discipline: Linguistic anthropologist
- Sub-discipline: Native American studies
- Institutions: University of Illinois at Urbana–Champaign

Jenny L. Davis is an American linguist, anthropologist, and poet. She is an Associate Professor of Anthropology, American Indian Studies, and Gender & Women's Studies at the University of Illinois at Urbana–Champaign where she is the director of the American Indian Studies Program. Her research is on contemporary Indigenous languages and identity, focusing on Indigenous language revitalization and Indigenous gender and sexuality, especially within the Two-Spirit movement.

She is an author of non-fiction, fiction, and poetry from Mannford, Oklahoma and a citizen of the Chickasaw Nation. Her books have been awarded the Ruth Benedict Prize by the Association for Queer Anthropology for her co-edited volume, Queer Excursions: Retheorizing Binaries in Language, Gender, and Sexuality. and the Beatrice Medicine Award for Best Monograph in American Indian Studies from the Native American Literature Symposium and the Association for the Study of American Indian Literatures for her book, Talking Indian: Identity and Language Revitalization in the Chickasaw Renaissance.

== Education ==
Davis studied Spanish and English at Oklahoma State University and holds an MA and PhD in Linguistics from the University of Colorado Boulder. She has held the Henry Roe Cloud Fellowship at Yale University and the Lyman T. Johnson Postdoctoral Fellowship at the University of Kentucky.

== Activism ==
Davis's activism is split between advocating for Indigenous and endangered language revitalization and the Two-Spirit movement. She served as a co-director of both the Two-Spirit Society of Denver (2007–2010) and the Tulsa Two-Spirit Society (2010–2011) and co-organizer of the 2009 International Two Spirit Gathering in Estes Park, Colorado. In 2014, she served as one of three head dancers at the Bay Area American Indian Two Spirit Society (BAAITS) Powwow.

Davis teaches workshops and courses around language documentation and revitalization and has been involved with the InField/CoLANG Institute as a co-instructor of the Language Activism course at the 2014, 2016, and 2018 summer institutes.

== Published works ==
=== Books ===
- Davis, Jenny L. (2022-02-01). Trickster Academy. University of Arizona Press. ISBN 9780816542659.
- Davis, Jenny L. (2018-04-17). Talking Indian: Identity and Language Revitalization in the Chickasaw Renaissance. University of Arizona Press. ISBN 9780816537686.
- Zimman, Lal (August 2014). Queer Excursions: Retheorizing Binaries in Language, Gender, and Sexuality. Studies in Language and Gender. Oxford University Press. ISBN 9780199937318.

== Honors and awards ==
- 2021 Dynamic Woman of the Chickasaw Nation Award, which annually recognizes a Chickasaw woman who has made great accomplishments in her career field and contributed towards the preservation and perpetuation of Chickasaw culture.
- 2019 Beatrice Medicine Award for Best Monograph in American Indian Studies for Talking Indian: Identity and Language Revitalization in the Chickasaw Renaissance from the Native American Literature Symposium and the Association for the Study of American Indian Literatures.
- 2014 Ruth Benedict Prize for Queer Excursions: Retheorizing Binaries in Language, Gender, and Sexuality from the Association for Queer Anthropology and the American Anthropological Association.

== Professional fellowships ==
- 2020-2021 Helen Corley Petit Scholar, University of Illinois, Urbana-Champaign
- 2019-2023 Chancellor's Fellow of Indigenous Research and Ethics, University of Illinois, Urbana-Champaign
- 2013-2014 Lyman T. Johnson Postdoctoral Fellow, Dept. of Linguistics, University of Kentucky.
- 2011-2012 Henry Roe Cloud Dissertation Writing Fellow in American Indian Studies, Yale University.

== Interviews and research coverage ==
- Yaquinto, Jessica (22 June 2023). "Language, Community, and Context - Ep 51". Heritage Voices Podcast.
- Pruden, Harlan (29 October 2019). "The Power to Say, NO and to Chart a New (and old) Path!". Two Spirit Journal.
- Hannabach, Cathy (2 January 2019). "Jenny L. Davis on Indigenous Language Revitalization". Imagine Otherwise. Ideas on Fire.
- Todd, Zoe (2 June 2015). "'academia has its own set of rules': Jenny Davis on language revitalization and Indigenous gender and sexuality in North America". Savage Minds: Notes and Queries in Anthropology.
