= Ellen Lewin =

Anthropologist and professor

- Born: 1946 (age 79–80)
- Occupations: Anthropologist, academic
- Awards: Ruth Benedict Prize

Academic background
- Education: Stanford University; College of the University of Chicago

Academic work
- Discipline: Feminist anthropology, Cultural anthropology
- Institutions: University of Iowa
- Notable works: Out in Theory: The Emergence of Lesbian and Gay Anthropology

Ellen Lewin is an American author, anthropologist, and academic. Lewin, a lesbian, focuses her work on areas of motherhood, sexuality, and reproduction. Lewin is a professor of anthropology at the University of Iowa. She is a recipient of the Ruth Benedict Prize.

== Biography ==
Ellen Lewin received her A.B. (Bachelors of Arts) in 1967 for linguistics from the College of the University of Chicago. She went on to obtain her AM (Masters of Arts) in Anthropology in 1968 and later her Ph.D. in Anthropology in 1975 at Stanford University. She concluded her studies at Stanford University with one of her earlier works, Mothers and Children: Latin American Immigrants in San Francisco.

Lewin conducted research on Latin American women in San Francisco for her dissertation. She also completed another study comparing aspects of motherhood among lesbians and heterosexual single women. Her research has focused on gender, sexuality, identity, reproduction, medical anthropology and lesbian/gay anthropology.

== Awards ==
Lewin is four times a recipient of the Ruth Benedict Prize: for two monographs, Lesbian Mothers: Accounts of Gender in American Culture (1992) and Gay Fatherhood: Narratives of Family and Citizenship in America (2010) and two edited volumes, Out in Public: Reinventing Lesbian/Gay Anthropology in a Globalizing World (co-edited with William L. Leap) (2009) and Out in Theory: The Emergence of Lesbian and Gay Anthropology (co-edited with William L. Leap) (2004).

== Notable works ==
- Lesbian Mothers: Accounts of Gender in American Culture (Cornell University Press, 1993)
- Recognizing Ourselves: Lesbian and Gay Ceremonies of Commitment (Columbia University Press, 1998)
- Editor of Inventing Lesbian Cultures in America (Beacon Press, 1996) and Feminist Anthropology: A Reader (Blackwell, 2006)
- Co-editor of Out in the Field: Reflections of Lesbian and Gay Anthropologists (University of Illinois Press, 1996), Out in Theory: The Emergence of Lesbian and Gay Anthropology (University of Illinois Press, 2002), and Reinventing Lesbian/Gay Anthropology in a Globalizing World with William Leap.
- Lewin, Ellen (2018). Filled with the Spirit: Sexuality, Gender, and Radical Inclusivity in a Black Pentecostal Church Coalition. University of Chicago Press.
