= Eržen =

Eržen is a Slovene surname. Notable people with the surname include:

- Anja Eržen (born 1992), Slovene cross-country skier
- Kaja Eržen (born 1994), Slovene footballer
- Peter Eržen (born 1941), Slovene ski jumper
- Žak Eržen (born 2005), Slovene cyclist
