= Queer Activism in India =

2012 book

- Author: Naisargi N. Dave
- Published: 2012
- Publisher: Zubaan Publications
- Pages: 266

Queer Activism in India: A Story in the Anthropology of Ethics is a 2012 anthropology book by Naisargi N. Dave, published by Zubaan Publications in New Delhi, India.
