= Michelle Rosaldo Book Prize =

The Michelle Rosaldo Book Prize was established in 2015 by the Association for Femininist Anthropology (AFA) in honor of anthropologist Michelle Rosaldo (1944-1981). Rosaldo is recognized for her research on the Ilongot people of the Philippines and for her leading role in the anthropology of gender. The prize is awarded to a first book by an author that makes a significant contribution to feminist anthropology.

== List of winners ==
Year	Author	Book
2015	Lucinda Ramberg	Given to the Goddess: South Asian Devadasis and the Sexuality of Religion
2017	Saida Hodžić	The Twilight of Cutting: African Activism and Life after NGOs
2017	Emilia Sanabria	Plastic Bodies: Sex Hormones and Menstrual Suppression in Brazil
2019	Juno Salazar Parreñas	Decolonizing Extinction: The Work of Care in Orangutan Rehabilitation

== See also ==
- List of anthropology awards

== See also ==
- Ruth Benedict Prize
