= Love in the Drug War =

2021 book

Love in the Drug War: Selling Sex and Finding Jesus on the Mexico-US Border is a 2020 anthropology book by Sarah Luna. The book examines the economic, social and religious lives of Mexican sex workers who migrate to Reynosa in search for economic opportunity and the relationship between them and American Christian missionaries who travel to do work in Northern Mexico.
