= Allah Made Us =

2009 book

Allah Made Us: Sexual Outlaws in an Islamic City
- Author: Rudolf Pell Gaudio
- Publisher: Wiley-Blackwell
- Publication date: 2009
- ISBN: 978-1405152525

Allah Made Us: Sexual Outlaws in an Islamic African City is a 2009 anthropology book by Rudolf Pell Gaudio. The book examines the lives of the yan daudu in Kano, Nigeria.
