= Hijras, Lovers, Brothers: Surviving Sex and Poverty in Rural India =

2021 book

- Author: Vaibhav Saria
- Publisher: Fordham University Press
- Publication date: 2021
- ISBN: 9780823294718

Hijras, Lovers, Brothers: Surviving Sex and Poverty in Rural India is an anthropology book by Vaibhav Saria.
