= Tanya Erzen =

Tanya Erzen

Tanya Erzen is a professor of Religious Studies and Crime, Law and Justice at the University of Puget Sound. She is also an author who has written four books as well as articles about religion, sexuality, gender and American conservatism. Her book Straight to Jesus: Sexual and Christian Conversions in the Ex-Gay Movement received the Ruth Benedict Prize from the American Anthropological Association and the Gustave O Arlt Award from American Anthropological Association.

== Bibliography ==
- God in Captivity: Redemption and Punishment in America's Faith-Based Prisons by Tanya Erzen, Beacon Press, 2017
- Fanpire: The Twilight Saga and the Women Who Love it by Tanya Erzen, Beacon Press, Oct 30, 2012
- Straight to Jesus: Sexual and Christian Conversions in the Ex-gay Movement by Tanya Erzen, University of California Press, 2006
- Out of Exodus: The Ex-gay Movement and the Transformation of the Christian Right by Tanya Erzen, New York University, Graduate School of Arts and Science, 2002
