= Museo Popol Vuh =

Art museum in Guatemala City, Guatemala

Coordinates: 14°37′29″N 90°31′58″W

Popol Vuh Museum
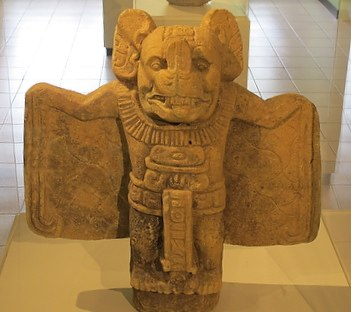
- Sculpture of a bat god
- Established: 1978
- Location: Universidad Francisco Marroquín, 6 Calle Fina, Zona 10, Guatemala 01010 (502) 2338-7896
- Type: Maya archaeology-Colonial art Museum
- Founders: Jorge and Ella Castillo
- Website: www.popolvuh.ufm.edu

The Museo Popol Vuh (Popol Vuh Museum) is home to one of the major collections of Maya art in the world. It is located on the campus of the Universidad Francisco Marroquín in Zone 10, Guatemala City. The museum is known for its extensive collection of pre-Columbian and colonial art of the Maya culture.

The Popol Vuh Museum is a private, nonprofit, scientific institution supported by its own funds and external donations. The museum is operated by a board of directors of citizens of Guatemala interested in the preservation and public display of the exhibits. One of its missions is to provide an educational focus for people who want to see and learn about the pre-Columbian past of Guatemala with the preservation, research, and diffusion of information.

Although the museum is well known for its funerary ceramic art, the collection includes a variety of portable stone sculptures, especially from the Preclassic period, and from the coast and adjacent highlands. The section on Maya pottery includes some of the best preserved Maya vases and bowls.

== History ==
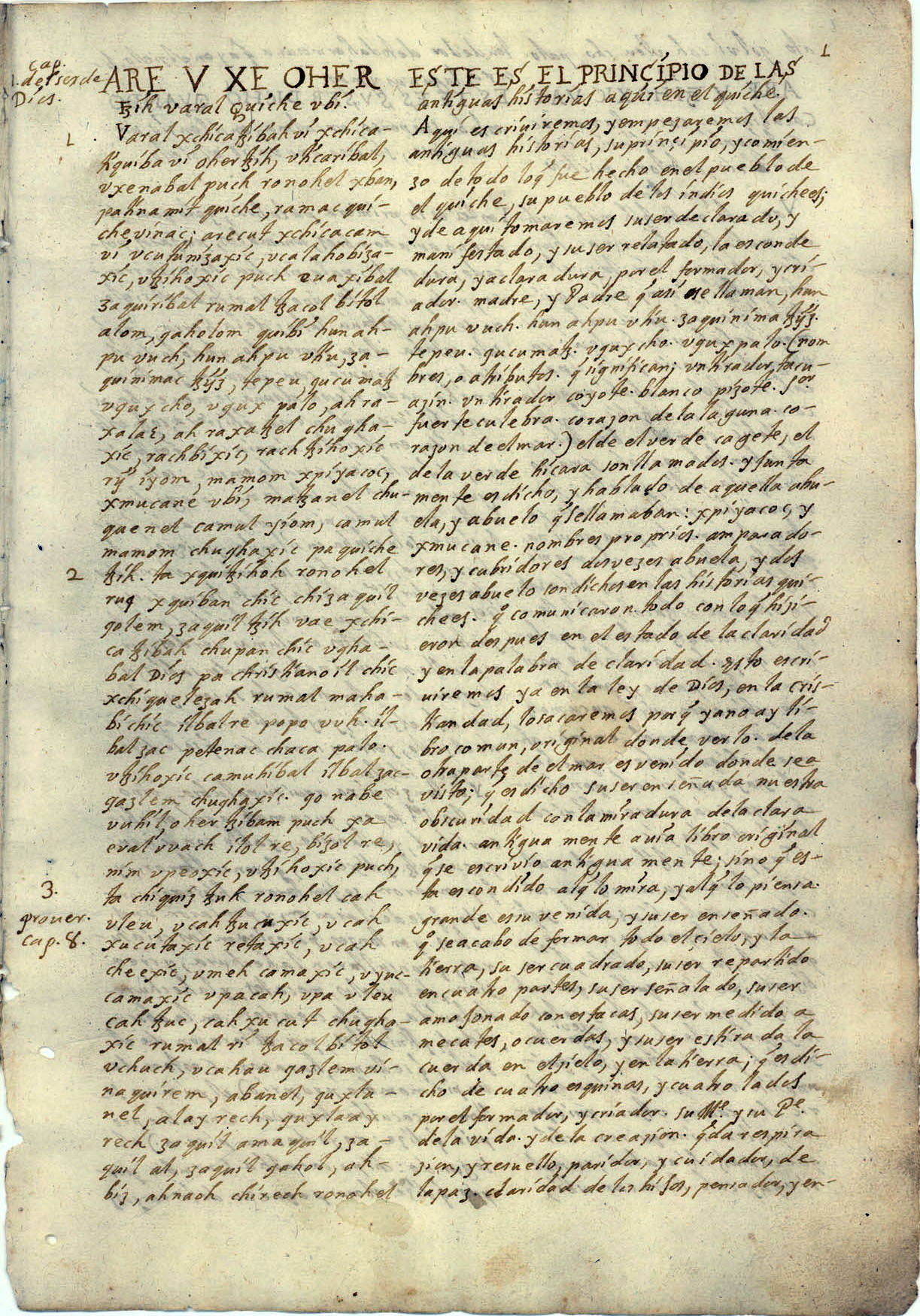
First page of the Popol Vuh manuscript, Newberry Library, Chicago, IL

The origin of the museum dates back to 1975, when Mr. Jorge Castillo hired Maro Tejada, a student of archaeology at la Universidad del Valle, to classify his extensive collection. After it was classified and set up for display in chronological order and it was opened up to the public in zone 1. After Mr.Castillo died in 1977, he decided to donate the collection to the Universidad Francisco Marroquín. The museum was created originally in 1977 to house the collection of Mr. and Mrs. Castillo and now forms part of a beautiful architectural complex of the Universidad Francisco Marroquín in Guatemala City. Jorge and Ella Castillo donated most of their collection of archaeological and colonial pieces in 1978 which are the basis of the Popol Vuh Museum today. They began their private collection of archaeological and colonial objects years before they established founding in 1977. The first location was in La Reforma Ave and 16th street, Guatemala City, but later moved to the Galerias Reforma building in Zone 9 in Guatemala City after three years. Sixteen years later, it was moved to Zone 10, where it stands today.

The museum is named after the Popol Vuh, a book written soon after the Spanish conquest of Guatemala. It narrates myths and pre-Columbian history of the Quiche, whose kings dominated great part of the Western plateau of Guatemala. The collection at the Popol Vuh Museum includes many objects related to the narratives of the Popol Vuh book.

== Buildings and facilities ==
The Museo Popol Vuh is one of the most modern of all the museums in Guatemala in terms of physical facilities. It has a very geometric architectural style opposed to the Mayan ruins and renaissance styles erected by the Spanish in Guatemala City. The museum has its preservations behind clear walls with advanced technology of display. The inside walls maintain neutral colors to keep focus on the artifacts.

The Popol Vuh Museum is located on the campus of Universidad Francisco Marroquin in Zone 10 of Guatemala City. It is open Monday through Friday from nine to five, Saturday from nine to one and is closed on Sunday. Wheelchair accessibility is available in the facility. There are no bus routes available to the museum. Transportation includes walking downhill from Sexta Avenida or yellow cab service.

The museum offers guided tours of each gallery along with workshops such as archaeological excavation, restoration activities, Mayan pottery creation, etc. Presentations, lectures, and courses are organized throughout the year to educate the community of the Mayan culture in the Guatemalan heritage.

== Collections and holdings ==
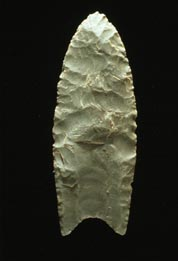
A clovis projectile point

The exhibit galleries are organized chronologically beginning with the Paleoindian, Archaic, Preclassic, Early Classic, Late Classic, and Postclassic periods of the ancient Maya and ending with Colonial Art. More than 400 archaeological and colonial treasures are on display.

Paleoindian (15,000 – 9000 BC): The oldest object in the Museum, which dates back to 9000 BC, is a clovis point, used as a sharp stone tool. It was found in Nahuala in Guatemala's western highlands and is one of the few found in the country. The Paleoindian period is characterized by hunter-gatherer groups who entered the America by crossing a land bridge connecting eastern Siberia and Alaska.

Archaic (9000 – 1500 BC): Most of the art found from the Archaic period was excavated from the central highlands and eastern pacific coast and includes many styles of ceramics, in specific, pottery. The Archaic period is recognized as the second period of human existence in the Americas and the shift from agriculture to sedimentary farming. Political organizations of chiefs and caciques and permanent agricultural settlements had been established by the end of this era. This civil structure influenced artists and what was painted on surface drawings on pottery art.

Kaminaljuyu and other Preclassic sites

Preclassic (1500 BC – 250 AD): Popular material found in artifacts during the Preclassic period involves ceramic, jade, and stone, much of which was traded with the Olmecs in the southern coast. The most notable site where most objects were found is the Kaminaljuyu in the valley of Guatemala, which became popular for its irrigation canal system and its great buildings. The scale of their development reflected the status, power, and wealth of the chiefs of Kaminaljuyu. Many of the oldest examples of hieroglyphic texts are from Guatemala from this rich site. Exhibits from this era include ceramics from the Middle and Late Preclassic era from the Kaminaljuyu and southern coast.

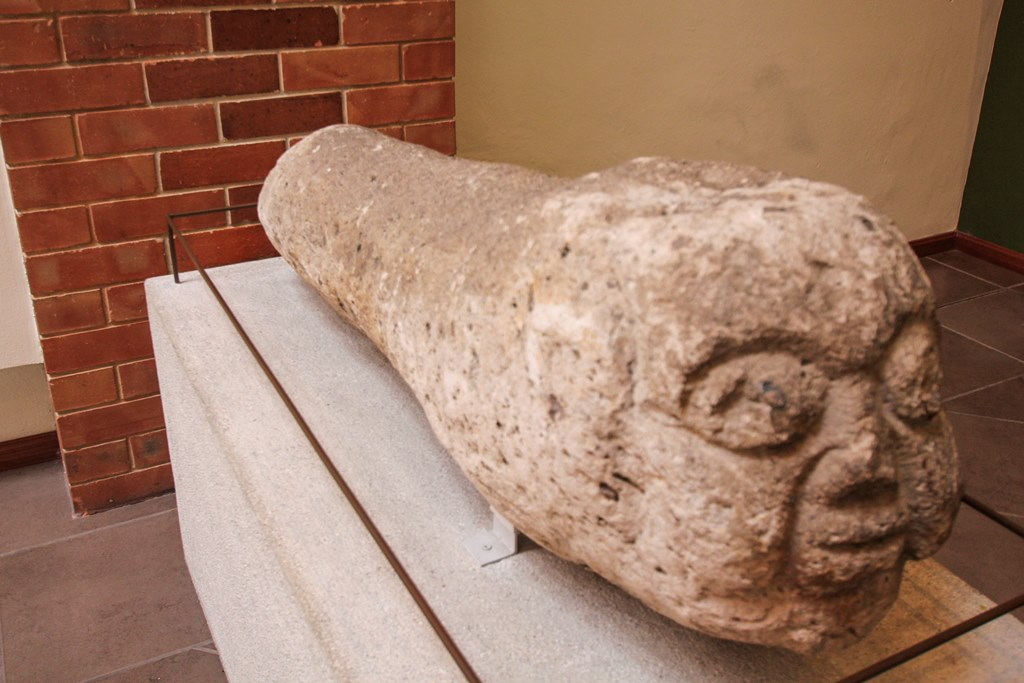
A sculptured face

Early Classic (250–600): During this period, hieroglyph text was adopted as the main form of communication and art and multi-colored ceramics emerged as a popular element of Classic Maya art. Exhibits include polychrome ceramics from this period. Influence from the large city of Teotihuacan in central Mexico is evident in ceramic art with incense burner and cylindrical tripods of decorative styles. The largest area of the permanent exhibit at the Popol Vuh Museum is dedicated to the Classic period.

Late Classic (600 – 900): This period is known for the greatest exponential growth of population in the northern lowlands. The Mayan hieroglyphic texts excavated from this region were advanced, indicating a great level of complex interaction between cities and their political leaders. Exhibits include painted ceramic art of several regional styles depicting mythology, religion with god like figures containing hieroglyphic texts, and often indicating the owner of the piece and the artist.

Postclassic (900 – 1,500): This era is registered as the decline of the Maya civilization prior to the Spanish conquest. During this time, much of the population in the highlands and southern coast sough change with the use and trade of gold and copper. Exhibits in the museum from this era include plumbate pottery which has orange and grey tones and depicted lives of animals and supernatural entities of their surfaces. Such pottery was greatly influenced by Mexican culture and was widely traded throughout the Mesoamerica until the end of the Early Postclassic period.

Colonial Period (1500 – 19th century): The colonial period followed the Spanish conquest and was marked by a rigidly stratified society. During the Colonial period in Guatemala, artistic forms were predominantly educational and religious. Guatemalan sculptures of the sixteenth through eighteenth centuries include examples of Renaissance, Baroque, and Neoclassic styles.
