= Roger Lancaster =

Roger Lancaster is a professor of anthropology and cultural studies at George Mason University in Fairfax, Virginia, where from 1999 until 2014 he directed the Cultural Studies PhD Program. He is known for his writing in LGBT studies, gender/sexuality, culture and political economy, and critical science studies. His research tries to understand how sexual mores, racial hierarchies, and class predicaments interact in a changing world.

Lancaster is a fellow in the American Anthropological Association. From 2004 to 2006, he served as the AAA's media liaison on kinship, the family, and marriage, fielding questions on same-sex marriage from a range of major media organizations.

== Career ==
Lancaster's first book, Thanks to God and the Revolution: Religion and Class Consciousness in the New Nicaragua (1988), was a study of liberation theology and other religious currents in Sandinista Nicaragua. Joining debates on the nature and origins of class consciousness, the book reworked established Marxist understandings of the role of religion in social life. From a Marxist-populist perspective, it views popular or folk religion as a recurring site where poor people reflect on class inequalities and devise understandings of morality and justice consistent with their self-interests. Its main argument is that elements of an implicit class consciousness are discernible in traditional saint's cults and in popular rites and festivities, and that these elements provide a springboard for the subsequent development of forms of explicit class consciousness (in liberation theology, Sandinismo, and Marxism).

Lancaster's first book had traced the Sandinista revolution's ascent; his second book examined its decline. Life is Hard: Machismo, Danger, and the Intimacy of Power in Nicaragua (1992) was an ethnography of everyday life during the contra war and its attendant economic crisis. Chronicling the lives of three poor families among their networks of friends and kin, it dissects plural and intimate forms of power—in gender relations, color discriminations, and same-sex relationships—that, Lancaster argues, undermined attempts to construct a revolutionary New Man (and Woman) and thus subverted the Sandinista project from below. The book is noted for its development of an analysis of machismo as a system of male domination over both women and men, and for its analysis of active/passive roles in male same-sex intercourse in some Latin American settings. Weaving semiotics, poststructuralism, and the Bakhtin school into an overarching Marxist approach, Life is Hard traded in the topical eclecticism of cultural studies, setting brisk chapters of media criticism alongside interviews and descriptions of Nicaragua's survival economy. The book won the Society for the Study of Social Problems' C. Wright Mills Award and the Society of Lesbian and Gay Anthropologists' Ruth Benedict Prize.

Lancaster's third monograph, The Trouble with Nature: Sex in Science and Popular Culture (2003), was a polemic against evolutionary psychology and other reductionist explanations for gender roles and sexual orientations. The book contrasts anthropological and historical perspectives on cultural diversity with evolutionary just-so stories, defending a social constructionist approach to human nature in chapters on sexual selection, masculinity, beauty, the social organization of reproduction, and the gay gene. The book's argument proceeds in part by showing that reductionist ideas are unscientific on their own terms and in part by underscoring a historical irony: stories about a hardwired and immutable human nature fluoresce in a period marked by pitched political struggles around sex, when shifts in production and institutional changes have thrown gender and sexual roles into question. Such stories offer comfort and certainty at a time when not much really seems certain about the nature of men, women, and others.

His fourth monograph, Sex Panic and the Punitive State (2011), won the author's second Ruth Benedict Prize. The book's first part provides a historical and ethnographic account of modern sex offender laws in the US; it shows how a series of sex panics have institutionalized a culture of sexual fear and produced draconian, ineffective laws. Its second part provides a wider polemical analysis of the development of mass incarceration and other aspects of the punitive state.

In addition to his monographs, Lancaster coedited (with Micaela di Leonardo) The Gender/Sexuality Reader: Culture, History, Political Economy (1997), a large advanced interdisciplinary introduction to the field. The Reader foregrounded historical, anthropological, and political-economic approaches at a time when literary theory dominated the field.

== Works ==
- Sex Panic and the Punitive State, University of California Press, 2011, 9780520262065
- The Trouble with Nature: Sex in Science and Popular Culture, University of California Press, 2003, 0520236203
- Edited with Micaela di Leonardo, The Gender/Sexuality Reader: Culture, History, Political Economy, Routledge, 1997, 0415910056
- Life is Hard: Machismo, Danger, and the Intimacy of Power in Nicaragua, University of California Press, 1992, ISBN 0-520-08929-4
- Thanks to God and the Revolution: Popular Religion and Class Consciousness in the New Nicaragua, Columbia University Press, 1988, 0231067305
