= Childbirth and Authoritative Knowledge: Cross-Cultural Perspectives =

1998 collection of essays

Childbirth and Authoritative Knowledge: Cross-Cultural Perspectives is a collection of anthropological essays that study birth and authoritative knowledge across sixteen different cultures that was first published in 1998 in the Journal of Gender Studies. It "extends and enriches" anthropologist Brigitte Jordan's work in the anthropology of birth. In 2003, it won the Council on Anthropology and Reproduction book award.

This collection is edited by Robbie Davis-Floyd and Carolyn Sargent. The book opens with a foreword by Rayna Rapp and examines in detail the various patterns of birth and how they've changed over time. Not only does the book study child-bearing across cultures, it also looks into the power that biomedical technology holds in the healthcare field.

Throughout the collection of essays, the twenty-three authors use authoritative knowledge as a theme to explore the ways it is evidenced and implemented in several different cultures. The book has eighteen chapters, creating five distinct parts. Each part of the book takes a look at authoritative knowledge from a new perspective or culture. The scholars behind the essays themselves come from numerous academic backgrounds. Davis-Floyd is quoted to have said that the purpose of the book is to "act both as a useful source of information about birth across cultures and as a charter for future research and further growth in the field."

== Contents ==
=== Part One: "The Social Construction of Authoritative Knowledge in Childbirth" ===
This section of essays primarily describes how technology is used in the American setting. This part of the book contains Brigitte Jordan's essay ("Authoritative Knowledge and Its Construction") along with context for the reader about the other essays in the book. Brigitte Jordan elaborates on the theme of authoritative knowledge in her book Birth in Four Cultures: A Cross cultural Investigation of Childbirth in Yucatan, Holland, Sweden and the United States. Firstly, Jordan elaborates on her idea of authoritative knowledge. She specifically defines it as follows:

"For any particular domain several knowledge systems may exist, some of which, by consensus, carry more weight than others, either because they explain the state of the world better for the purposes at hand...or because they are associated with a stronger power base."

Jordan also uses her essay to critique the hierarchical use of authoritative knowledge in a birth setting and provide context for the rest of the essays in the book. This theme is mentioned by other authors throughout the book.

Part One also contains an essay by Wenda R. Trevathan titled "An Evolutionary Perspective on Authoritative Knowledge about Birth". This essay compares the human birth process to that of the apes.

=== Part Two: "Intracultural Variations in Authoritative Knowledge about Birth: Biomedical Hegemony and Women's Choices" ===
This second section of Davis-Floyd and Sargent's edited collection contains four essays. This set of papers looks at the large scale, macro-factors that effect pre-natal care and childbirth in Greece, Japan and the United States. This section of the book also examines the power dynamics that the biomedical field possesses in governing the way that women make choices.

Eugenia Georges writes that in Greece, the ultrasound plays an important role in how a Greek mother views her pregnancy. For these mothers, authoritative knowledge is perpetuated by the ultrasound machine and the way that these women rely on it. In America, giving birth is often determined by class, income and authoritative knowledge. This is the topic of Carole H. Browner and Nancy Press's essay ("The Production of Authoritative Knowledge in American Prenatal Care") as well as the essay in the following chapter "What Do Women Want? Issues of Choice, Control and Class in American Pregnancy and Childbirth" written by Ellen Lazarus. Browner and Press's essay specifically covers the role that bio-medics play in what is perceived as authoritative knowledge for a successful birth. Ellen Lazarus shows that the lack of knowledge surrounding the technology used in hospitals, especially in terms of the race and class of the patient, combined with the good intentions of all those involved also perpetuates authoritative knowledge. Lazarus elaborates on how things can go wrong despite the mother-to-be carefully selecting who will be involved in the birthing process.

The fourth and final essay in this part of the book "Authoritative Knowledge and Birth Territories in Contemporary Japan" by Deborah Cordero Fiedler discusses the role of authoritative knowledge in Japan. In contrast to the United States, Japan uses technology during birth, however physicians will not immediately intervene. Fiedler's findings discuss the role that culture has in impacting birth and motherhood in contemporary Japan.

=== Part Three: "Intercultural Variations in Authoritative Knowledge about Birth Hierarchy, Community and the Social Ground" ===
The third section of the book also contains four essays giving examples of women in North America, Nepal, Central and Eastern Europe who have given birth and the difficulties they faced. This group of chapters also examines how a top-down community approach and other approaches to childbirth intersect to create the way that authoritative knowledge surrounding this technology came to exist.

Carolyn F. Sargent and Grace Bascope's essay ("Ways of Knowing about Birth in Three Cultures") compares the ways that women view birth practitioners and decisions made during birth in Texas, Jamaica and the Yucatan. The author shows the ways that authoritative knowledge is used in certain social / cultural groups in relation to others. The essay by Shiela Kitzinger ("Authoritative Tough in Childbirth: A Cross-Cultural Approach") explores the way that women experience touch during birth, the different kinds of touch experiences and the ways that authoritative knowledge plays into this experience.

The following essay, by Stacy Leigh Pigg ("Authority in Translation: Finding, Knowing, Naming, and Training 'Traditional Birth Attendants' in Nepal") explores how training programs designed to train traditional birth attendants end up creating a unique hierarchy and power relation in Nepal.

The final essay "Changing Childbirth in Eastern Europe: Which Systems of Authoritative Knowledge Should Prevail?", written by Beverley Chalmers, investigates the highly medicalized birth systems in Europe and which ones play a role in authoritative knowledge.

=== Part Four: "Fighting the System: Creating and Maintaining Alternative Models of Authoritative Knowledge" ===
The fourth part of the book contains four essays, two of which follow the idea about the power that traditional birthing practices like midwifery can hold. This part of the book shows some of the different models through which authoritative knowledge can be employed. It seeks to encapsulate the ways that authoritative knowledge surrounding technology has been resisted in some countries. There are also examples of the ways that mothers receive knowledge via childbirth activists.

The first essay in this part is written by Jane Szurek ("Resistance to Technology-Enhanced Childbirth in Tuscany: The Political Economy of Italian Birth") and discusses the authority of the medical field in Italy. This essay takes a particular focus on the way that a more medicalized way of birth has been resisted, specifically by birth activists, in this part of the world.

An essay by Robbie Davis-Floyd and Elizabeth Davis ("Intuition as Authoritative Knowledge in Midwifery and Home Birth") explores the dangers that American midwives face in their practice and the ways that their knowledge is used as authoritative knowledge. The specific focus of this chapter is the viability of midwives' intuition as a source of knowledge.

The third author in this part of the book, Kenneth C. Johnson ("Randomized Control Trials as Authoritative Knowledge: Keeping an Ally from Becoming a Threat to North American Midwifery Practice"), discusses the impact that evidenced-based care has on the use of the randomized control trial and the ways in which this kind of research can impede on the rights of women.

The following essay in this part, written by Marsden Wagner ("Confessions of a Dissident"), explains the perspective that the World Health Organization (WHO) has on the care of mothers, only after describing how he got into the field of public health.

=== Part Five: "Viable Indigenous Systems of Authoritative Knowledge: Continuity in the Face of Change" ===
The final part of the book follows communities and countries that utilize indigenous birthing systems, resist change, and are able to maintain their existing systems of authoritative knowledge. The cultures examined are: Oaxaca, Mexico, the Puejehun District, Sierra Leone, the Inuit community, and the Kung of Kalahari.

Paola M. Sesia ("'Women come here on their own when they need to': Prenatal Care, Authoritative Knowledge, and Maternal Health in Oaxaca") explores the birthing practices, particularly massages, that are utilized in Oaxaca. Amara Jambai and Coral MacCormack ("Maternal Health, War, and Religious Tradition: Authoritative Knowledge in Pujehun District, Sierra Leone") take particular interest in women who give birth in this war stricken region of Sierra Leone. Betty-Anne Daviss ("Heeding Warning from the Canary, the Whale, and the Inuit: A Framework for Analyzing Competing Types of Knowledge about Childbirth") brings North America into the discussion with a focus on birth in the Inuit community in Canada and how traditional practice has been changed by the building of birth centers. Megan Biesele ("An Ideal of Unassisted Birth: Hunting, Healing, and Transformation among the Kalahari Ju/'hoansi") examines Kalahari Ju/'hoansi cultures in Botswana and Namibia, the independence, and the spirituality of birth that exists in these cultures.
