= Elise Andaya =

Cultural anthropologist

- Title: Associate Professor

Academic background
- Education: New York University
- Thesis: Reproducing the Revolution: Gender, Kinship, and the State in Contemporary Cuba (2007)
- Doctoral advisor: Rayna Rapp

Academic work
- Discipline: Cultural anthropology
- Sub-discipline: Medical anthropology Gender anthropology
- Institutions: University of Albany
- Notable works: Conceiving Cuba: Reproduction, Women, and the State in the Post-Soviet Era

Elise L. Andaya is a feminist cultural medical anthropologist who is currently employed as a Professor of Anthropology by the University of Albany in New York state. Andaya studies Medical anthropology and gender anthropology and focuses on the effects of gender and citizenship on reproduction and access to healthcare in Cuba and the United States. She attended New York University in New York City, New York. She previously was on the Research Development Committee for the American Anthropological Association, and was a member at large for them from 2014–2017.

== Research ==
=== Cuba ===
In Cuba Elise Andaya focused on how the fall of the Soviet Union effected economics and ideals and in turn how they changed views on reproduction, gender, and kinship strategies as well as prenatal care. Andaya interviewed lay people as well as medically trained professionals. She visited neighborhood clinics and attended consultations pertaining to reproduction. The objective of her research was to explore the way changes in politics and economics effect families and reproduction. Her research culminated multiple publications. In April 2014 her book "Conceiving Cuba: Reproduction, Women, and the State in the Post-Soviet Era" was published by Rutgers University Press, and is taught at Princeton University in the class "Medicine and Society in Contemporary Cuba".

In 2007 she published her dissertation "Reproducing the Revolution: Gender, Kinship, in Contemporary Cuba". Her dissertation argues that Cuba's struggling economy is connected to low fertility rates. She asserts that the government's lack of care, men's general indifference toward children, and the difficulty of obtaining contraceptives cause women to seek abortions. In 2009 her article "The Gift of Health" was published. This article discussed how larger changes in socialism affect the care of patients. Andaya argues that due to the destabilization of the Cuban Government, healthcare no longer follows the socialist idea of egalitarianism, instead it is based on small "gifts" given as payment for the doctor. Andaya argues that this represents the beginning of a market economy.

Andaya's work was reviewed by Latin American Politics & Society which wrote that her "study succeeds in giving us a subtle and complex picture (which broad-brush approaches cannot) of how the complicated, and often contradictory politics and policies of reproduction emerged in Cuba after 1959." The Journal of Pan African Studies writes that Andaya's book, Conceiving Cuba: Reproduction, Women, and the State in the Post-Soviet Era, "considers not only how socialist policies have profoundly affected the ways Cuban families imagine the future, but also how the current crisis in reproduction has deeply influenced ordinary Cubans' views on socialism and the future of the revolution."

=== New York ===
She recently conducted a five-year observation period of the practices surrounding breast feeding in Bronx, New York City. She focused on one public hospital to observe and examined how health care and health-seeking for women who work in low-paying service-center jobs was affected by time and scheduling issues. She is currently working with social scientists to synthesize the information she collected.

Through her research in a prenatal clinic in New York, she published multiple pieces, including her second book, "Pregnant at Work: Low-Wage Workers, Power, and Temporal Injustice", published by NYU Press in March 2024. Apart from the book, her article "Race-ing Time: Clinical Temporalities and Inequality in Public Prenatal Care." was published in Medical Anthropology in 2019, and she co-authored "Trading in Harms: COVID-19 and Sexual and Reproductive Health Disparities During the First Surge in New York State." with Dr. Rajani Bhatia in Social Science and Medicine in 2023. Elise Andaya researched how the change of laws about abortion policies in the United States has effected our reproductive rights for individuals.

== Grants ==
In April 2004 she was awarded a grant from the Wenner-Gren Foundation to do research for her dissertation. She conducted participant observation in Havana, Cuba for her dissertation: "Reproducing the Revolution: Gender, Kinship, and the State in Contemporary Cuba", which was supervised by Dr. Rayna Rapp.

== Awards ==
- "Conceiving Cuba: Reproduction, Women, and the State in the Post-Soviet Era" received the title of best book about reproduction in 2014 from the Adele E. Clark Book Awards.
- "Conceiving Cuba: Reproduction, Women, and the State in the Post-Soviet Era" received an honorable mention for a first book in feminist Anthropology from the Michelle Z. Rosoldo Prize.
- "Pregnant at Work: Low-Wage Workers, Power, and Temporal Injustice" was named the awardee for the 2024 Senior Book Prize by the Association for Feminist Anthropology.

== Bibliography ==
- Andaya, Elise. Conceiving Cuba: Reproduction, Women, and the State in the Post-Soviet Era. Rutgers University Press, 2014. JSTOR, http://www.jstor.org/stable/j.ctt6wq9z3. Accessed 19 Feb. 2025.
- Andaya, Elise, Pregnant at Work: Low-Wage Workers, Power, and Temporal Injustice (New York, NY, 2024; online edn, NYU Press Scholarship Online, 19 Sept. 2024), https://doi.org/10.18574/nyu/9781479817610.001.0001, accessed 18 Feb. 2025.
