= Civil liberties in the United States =

Unalienable rights

Civil liberties in the United States are certain unalienable rights retained by (as opposed to privileges granted to) those in the United States, under the Constitution of the United States, as interpreted and clarified by the Supreme Court of the United States and lower federal courts. Civil liberties are simply defined as individual legal and constitutional protections from entities more powerful than an individual, for example, parts of the government, other individuals, or corporations. The explicitly defined liberties make up the Bill of Rights, including freedom of speech, the right to bear arms, and the right to privacy. There are also many liberties of people not defined in the Constitution, as stated in the Ninth Amendment: The enumeration in the Constitution, of certain rights, shall not be construed to deny or disparage others retained by the people.

The extent of civil liberties and the percentage of the population of the United States who had access to these liberties has expanded over time. For example, the Constitution did not originally define who was eligible to vote, allowing each state to determine who was eligible. In the early history of the U.S., most states allowed only white male adult property owners to vote (about 6% of the population). The 'Three-Fifths Compromise' allowed the southern slaveholders to consolidate power and maintain slavery in America for eighty years after the ratification of the Constitution. And the Bill of Rights had little impact on judgements by the courts for the first 130 years after ratification.

== United States Constitution ==
=== Freedom of religion ===
The text of Amendment I to the United States Constitution, ratified December 15, 1791, states that:

"Congress shall make no law... prohibiting the free exercise thereof;"

— United States Constitution, Amendment I

=== Freedom of expression ===
==== Free Speech Clause ====
The text of Amendment I to the United States Constitution, ratified December 15, 1791, states that:

"Congress shall make no law... abridging the freedom of speech,"

— United States Constitution, Amendment I

==== Free Press Clause ====
The text of Amendment I to the United States Constitution, ratified December 15, 1791, states that:

"Congress shall make no law... abridging... the press,"

— United States Constitution, Amendment I

==== Free Assembly Clause ====
The text of Amendment I to the United States Constitution, ratified December 15, 1791, states that:

"Congress shall make no law... abridging... the right of the people peaceably to assemble,"

— United States Constitution, Amendment I

==== Petition Clause ====
The text of Amendment I to the United States Constitution, ratified December 15, 1791, states that:

"Congress shall make no law... abridging... the right of the people... to petition the Government for a redress of grievances."

— United States Constitution, Amendment I

==== Free speech exceptions ====
The following types of speech are not protected constitutionally: defamation or false statements, child pornography, obscenity, damaging the national security interests, verbal acts, and fighting words. Because these categories fall outside of the First Amendment privileges, the courts can legally restrict or criminalize any expressive act within them. Other expressions, including threat of bodily harm or publicizing illegal activity, may also be ruled illegal.

=== Right to keep and bear arms ===
The text of Amendment II to the United States Constitution, ratified December 15, 1791, states that:

"A well regulated Militia, being necessary to the security of a free state, the right of the people to keep and bear Arms, shall not be infringed."

— United States Constitution, Amendment II

=== Sexual freedom ===
The concept of sexual freedom includes a broad range of different rights that are not mentioned in the U.S. Constitution. The idea of sexual freedom has sprung more from the popular opinion of society in more recent years, and has had very little Constitutional backing. The following liberties are included under sexual freedom: sexual expression, sexual choices, sexual education, reproductive justice, and sexual health. Sexual freedom in general is considered an implied procedure, and is not mentioned in the Constitution.

Sexual freedoms include the freedom to have consensual sex with whomever a person chooses, at any time, for any reason, provided the person is of the age of majority. Marriage is not required, nor are there any requirements as to the gender or number of people you have sex with. Sexual freedom includes the freedom to have private consensual homosexual sex (Lawrence v. Texas).

=== Equal protection ===
Equal protection prevents the government from creating laws that are discriminatory in application or effect.

=== Right to vote ===
The text of Amendment XIV to the United States Constitution, ratified July 9, 1868, states that:

"when the right to vote at any election for the choice of electors for President and Vice President of the United States, Representatives in Congress, the Executive and Judicial officers of a State, or the members of the Legislature thereof, is denied to any of the ~~male~~ inhabitants of such State, being ~~twenty-one~~ (eighteen) years of age, and citizens of the United States, or in any way abridged, except for participation in rebellion, or other crime, the basis of representation therein shall be reduced in the proportion which the number of such ~~male~~ citizens shall bear to the whole number of ~~male~~ citizens ~~twenty-one~~ (eighteen) years of age in such State."

— United States Constitution, Article XIV

The text of Amendment XV to the United States Constitution, ratified February 3, 1870, states that:

"The right of citizens of the United States to vote shall not be denied or abridged by the United States or by any State on account of race, color, or previous condition of servitude."

— United States Constitution, Article XV

The text of Amendment XIX to the United States Constitution, ratified August 18, 1919, states that:

"The right of citizens of the United States to vote shall not be denied or abridged by the United States or by any State on account of sex."

— United States Constitution, Amendment XIX

The text of Amendment XXIV to the United States Constitution, ratified January 23, 1964, states that:

"The right of citizens of the United States to vote in any primary or other election for President or Vice President, for electors for President or Vice President, or for Senator or Representative in Congress, shall not be denied or abridged by the United States or any state by reason of failure to pay any poll tax or other tax."

— United States Constitution, Amendment XXIII

The text of Amendment XXVI to the United States Constitution, ratified July 1, 1971, states that:

"The right of citizens of the United States, who are 18 years of age or older, to vote, shall not be denied or abridged by the United States or any state on account of age."

— United States Constitution, Amendment XXVI

=== Right to parent one's children ===
The right to parent one's own children also includes the right for a parent to teach their children as they see fit.

=== Right to privacy ===
The Constitution of the United States and the United States Bill of Rights do not explicitly include a right to privacy.

In the US, the right of marital privacy was recognized by the Supreme Court in Griswold v. Connecticut, 381 U.S. 479 (1965) as falling within the penumbra of the Bill of Rights.

In 1890, Warren and Brandeis drafted an article published in the Harvard Law Review titled "The Right To Privacy" that is often cited as the first implicit finding of a U.S. stance on the right to privacy.

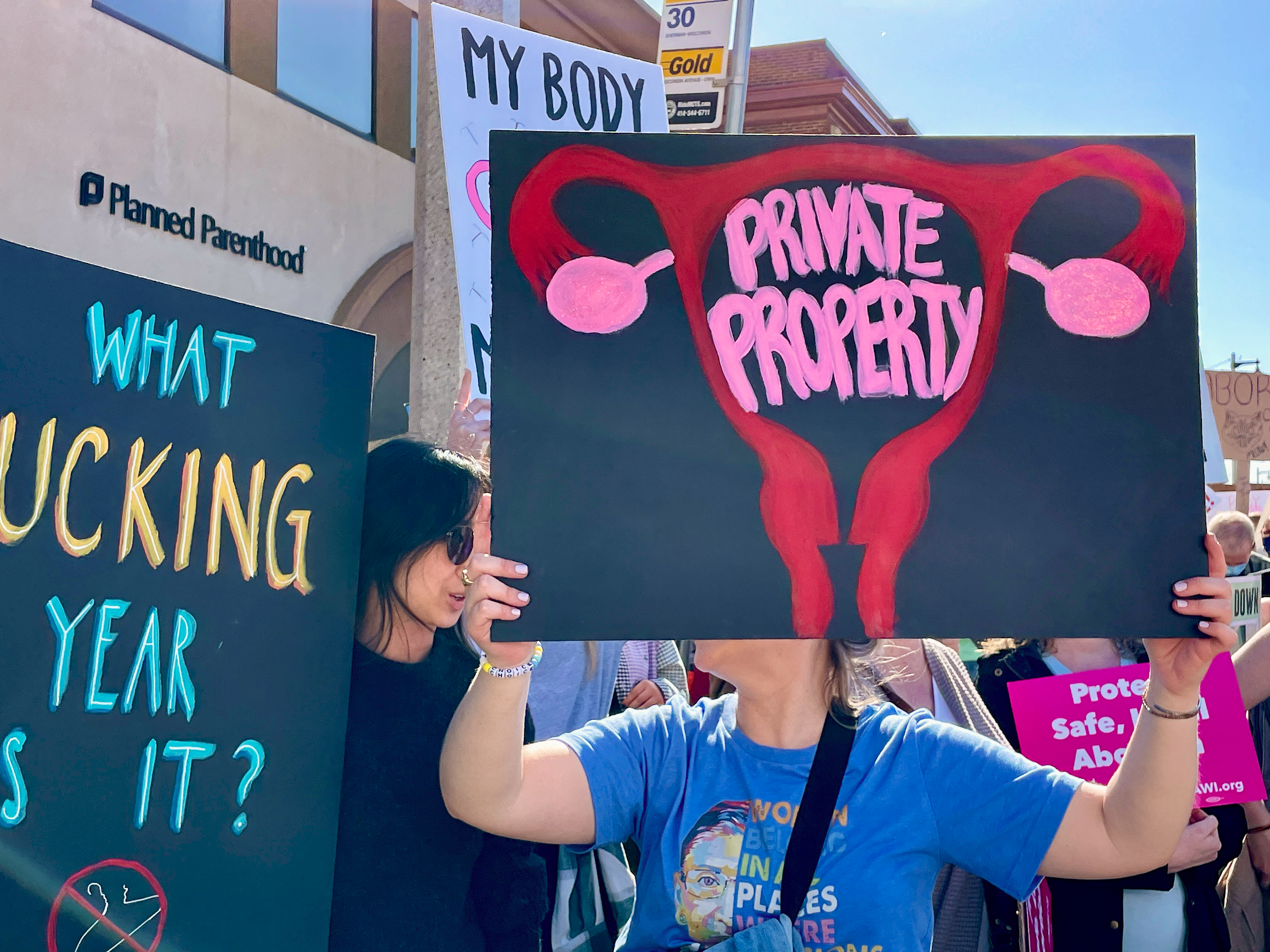
Activists call for a right to privacy in response to the overturning of Roe v Wade.

Right to privacy has been the justification for decisions involving a wide range of civil liberties cases, including Pierce v. Society of Sisters, which invalidated a successful 1922 Oregon initiative requiring compulsory public education; Roe v. Wade, which struck down an abortion law from Texas, and thus restricted state powers to enforce laws against abortion; and Lawrence v. Texas, which struck down a Texas sodomy law, and thus eliminated state powers to enforce laws against sodomy. Dobbs v. Jackson Women's Health Organization later overruled Roe v. Wade, in part due to the Supreme Court finding that the right to privacy was not mentioned in the constitution, leaving the future validity of these decisions uncertain.

Legally, the right of privacy is a basic law which includes:

1. The right of persons to be free from unwarranted publicity
2. Unwarranted appropriation of one's personality
3. Publicizing one's private affairs without a legitimate public concern
4. Wrongful intrusion into one's private activities

However, outside of recognized private locations, American law, for the most part, grants next to no privacy for those in public areas. In other words, no verbal or written consent is needed to take photos or videos of those in public areas. This laxness extends to potentially embarrassing situations such as when actress Jennifer Garner bent over to retrieve something from her car and revealed her underwear to create a whale tail. Because the photographer took the photo in a public location, in this case a pumpkin patch, circulating the photo online was a legal act.

For the health care sector where medical records are part of an individual's privacy, The Privacy Rule of the Health Insurance Portability and Accountability Act was passed in 1996. This act safeguards medical data of the patient which also includes giving individuals rights over their health information, like getting a copy of their records and seeking correction. Medical anthropologist Khiara Bridges has argued that the US Medicare system requires so much personal disclosure from pregnant women that they effectively do not have privacy rights.

=== Right to marriage ===
The 1967 United States Supreme Court ruling in the case Loving v. Virginia found a fundamental right to marriage, regardless of race. The 2015 United States Supreme Court ruling in the case Obergefell v. Hodges found a fundamental right to marriage, regardless of gender.

=== Rights of self-defense ===
The right to self-defense is rooted in common law and has been incorporated into statutory law in all 50 states. It serves as a legal justification for the use of force, including deadly force in some cases, when an individual reasonably believes they are in imminent danger of bodily harm or death.

The use of force in self-defense is generally considered justifiable for the protection of oneself. However, there are limitations on when and how this force can be applied. The law typically requires that the force used be proportional to the threat faced, and that the person claiming self-defense had a reasonable belief that they were in danger.

Historically, many jurisdictions required individuals to attempt to retreat from a dangerous situation before using force in self-defense. However, this requirement has been modified or eliminated in many states through the adoption of stand-your-ground laws.

Self-defense laws can also vary significantly from state to state. For example, only 13 states maintain a strict duty to retreat before using deadly force in self-defense. Additionally, some states limit the application of stand-your-ground laws to certain locations, such as one's home or vehicle. The threshold for what constitutes a reasonable belief of imminent danger also differs between jurisdictions.

== See also ==
- American Civil Liberties Union
- Civil liberties in the United Kingdom
- Civil rights movement
- Constitution of the United States
