= Khiara Bridges =

American anthropologist and legal academic

- Born: 1978 or 1979 (age 46–47)
- Education: Spelman College (BA); Columbia University (JD, PhD)
- Occupations: Professor of Law at Berkeley School of Law; Professor of Law and Associate Professor of Anthropology at Boston University School of Law

Khiara M. Bridges (born 1978/1979) is an American law professor and anthropologist specializing in the intersectionality of race, reproductive justice, and law. She is best known for her book, Reproducing Race: An Ethnography of Pregnancy as a Site of Racialization, in which she argues that race and class largely affect the prenatal, childbirth, and postnatal experiences of women.

In 2011, Bridges received an honorable mention for the Delmos Jones and Jagna Sharff Memorial Book Prize for the Critical Study of North America.

== Education ==
In 1999, Bridges completed her bachelor's degree in sociology after three years at Spelman College, where she served as valedictorian and graduated summa cum laude. Bridges then pursued a degree in law, graduating with a J.D. from Columbia Law School in 2002. Bridges earned her Ph.D. in anthropology from Columbia University in 2008.

== Career ==
During her time at Spelman College, Bridges worked in Atlanta as a counselor at the Feminist Women's Health Center. At Columbia University, she worked with David Leebron and E. Allan Farnsworth as a teaching assistant, and was a member of the Columbia Law Review and a James Kent Scholar. Bridges has also worked for the Miami Herald as a reporter.

Bridges is currently a professor of law at University of California, Berkeley School of Law. She has published numerous journal articles and the book, Reproducing Race: An Ethnography of Pregnancy as a Site of Racialization. She is on the board of directors for Pregnancy Justice [formerly National Advocates for Pregnant Women (NAPW)] as well as on the Academic Advisory Council for Law Students for Reproductive Justice. Bridges is co-editor of a University of California Press book series on reproductive justice.

Bridges is also a professional dancer trained in classical ballet, and performs with Ballet Inc.

== Published works ==
Bridges first book, Reproducing Race: An Ethnography of Pregnancy as a Site of Racialization, published in 2011, documents the findings of eighteen months of Bridges' ethnographic fieldwork spent in a large, metropolitan hospital in New York City. In Reproducing Race, Bridges argues that race affects the ways that women receive prenatal care and alters their experiences of hospital childbirth. Bridges focuses on how race and socioeconomic status interact and comes to the conclusion that medical professionals are influenced by racial stereotypes when making decisions about the treatment of women. In Reproducing Race, Bridges discusses topics such as stratified reproduction, eugenics, and the racialization of disease. Rayna Rapp, an anthropologist who has written much on birth in the United States, commends Reproducing Race for Bridges' argument that "racist eugenics haunts contemporary hospital-speak, whatever individual intentions may be."

Bridges is also the author of The Poverty of Privacy Rights, published in June 2017. In this book, Bridges argues that poor mothers as a marginalized population do not share in privacy rights and that they face repeated privacy violations by the state. In 2019, she released Critical Race Theory: A Primer, a book examining critical race theory's basic commitments, strengths, and weaknesses.

== Bibliography ==
- Reproducing Race: An Ethnography of Pregnancy as a Site of Racialization (2011)
- The Poverty of Privacy Rights (2017)
- Critical Race Theory: A Primer (2019)
