= Rayna Rapp =

Academic

- Born: 1946 (age 79–80)
- Other name: Rayna R. Reiter (pen name)
- Occupation: Anthropologist professor

Academic background
- Education: Ph.D., University of Michigan, anthropology, 1969-73 M.A., University of Michigan, anthropology, 1968-69 B.S., University of Michigan, anthropology (with honors), 1964-68

Academic work
- Discipline: Medical anthropology
- Institutions: New School for Social Research (1973-1998) New York University (2001-present)

Rayna Rapp (pen name Rayna R. Reiter) is a professor and associate chair of anthropology at New York University, specializing in gender and health; the politics of reproduction; science, technology, and genetics; and disability in the United States and Europe. She has contributed over 80 published works to the field of anthropology, independently, as a co-author, editor, and foreword-writing, including Robbie Davis-Floyd and Carolyn Sargent's Childbirth and Authoritative Knowledge. Her 1999 book, Testing Women, Testing the Fetus: the Social Impact of Amniocentesis in America, received multiple awards upon release and has been praised for providing "invaluable insights into the first generation of women who had to decide whether or not to terminate their pregnancies on the basis of amniocentesis result". She co-authored many articles with Faye Ginsburg, including Enabling Disability: Rewriting Kinship, Reimagining Citizenship, a topic the pair has continued to research.

== Education and career ==
Rapp received her PhD from the University of Michigan in 1973 after completing her bachelor's (with honors) and master's degrees from 1964 to 1969, each in anthropology. After obtaining her PhD, Rapp continued her academic career at the New School for Social Research from 1973 to 1998, where she chaired the anthropology department and founded and chaired the graduate program in gender studies and feminist theory. She published Testing Women, Testing the Women in 1999 after fifteen years of field work during her time there. In 2001, Rapp became a professor of anthropology at New York University, acquiring the role of associate chair of the department in 2010. She served on the executive board of the American Anthropological Association from 2012 to 2015.

Rapp has spoken at multiple universities and conferences around the United States and Europe, including the University of Texas at Austin, University of Kentucky, and the MacLean Center for Clinical Medical Ethics.

Rapp has also acted as mentor and advisor to feminist anthropologists Khiara Bridges and Elise Andaya.

Rapp believes "there is 'a widening chasm' between the medical-scientific utopian dreams of human perfectibility and the public's understanding of human diversity and impairment". Her work in both genetics and reproduction has resulted in extensive research into multiple reproductive technologies, including amniocentesis and non-invasive prenatal diagnosis tests. Rapp stresses the "highly stratified and gendered benefits and burdens" these types of technologies carry and the audience they are marketed to. Rapp has extended this work to examine how human disability intersects with prejudice, diversity, and "discrimination based on racial-ethnic, class, national, religious, and gendered backgrounds". Her current project is projected to concern the relationships between neuroscience, disability, neurodiversity, familial structures, and activism.

=== Work with Faye Ginsburg ===
Rapp's work with long-time coauthor Faye Ginsburg focuses on disability, reproduction, science, and social structures. Their most recent work, "'Not Dead Yet': Changing Disability Imaginaries in the 21st Century" examines the continuation of eugenic thinking and how it intersects with disability and public consciousness. The pair have also explored "disability consciousness and cultural innovation in special education". Rapp and Ginsburg's previous work, Conceiving the New World Order: The Global Politics of Reproduction brought together multiple articles with the purpose of placing reproduction at the center of social theory. In that collection, Ginsburg and Rapp recall Shellee Colen's idea of "stratified reproduction", which they define as: "The power relations by which some categories of people are empowered to nurture and reproduce, while others are disempowered." Karen-Sue Taussig identifies the importance of reproduction in anthropology and points out the highly gendered nature of this discipline: in the collection, 28 of the pieces are by females with 2 male co-authors. Carolyn Sargent has praised the collection for "effectively [tracing] the intersections between global dynamics and local cultural logic and social relations." Similarly, anthropologist Robbie Davis-Floyd claimed that the work "marks the maturation of the anthropology of reproduction" and identified it as one of the most important works in the field of reproductive anthropology at the time. The work has also been identified as highlighting the intersections between reproduction, kinship, the body, and sexuality.

== Influence and critical reception ==
Towards an Anthropology of Women (1975), which Rapp edited under the name Rayna Reiter, brings together articles that examine the historical structures that influence gender and inequity across cultures, but does so without trying to prove the universality of womanhood, according to June Nash. Nash views the collection as simultaneously promoting the study and understanding of both women and anthropology.

In 1999, Rapp published Testing Women, Testing the Fetus: the Social Impact of Amniocentesis in America, which Adele Clark describes as "[making] significant and enduring contributions to...sociology and science and technology, medical sociology and anthropology, research methods, women's studies, feminist theory, clinical genetics, medicine, [and] nursing." The book examines the effects of the routinization of fetal diagnosis and analyzes its cultural and social significance in a U.S. context, positing that pregnant women's experience with amniocentesis is deeply influenced by gender, race, and class. Rapp drew on her own experience with amniocentesis in her approach towards the book, participating in fifteen years of fieldwork and engaging with laboratory technicians, geneticists, support groups (of women who terminated pregnancies and families with disabled children), families of children with Down syndrome, genetic counselors, women who underwent amniocentesis or who refused the test, and some male partners. Rapp also suggests ideological links between abortion rights and disability rights activists, and argues that society should cultivate better communication between the two "realms".

== Honors and awards ==
- 2014–15 John Simon Guggenheim Fellowship
- 2012 "Engendering the Field: a Story of Contingency" Distinguished Lecture/ plaque (AAA)
- 2002 GAD Centennial Distinguished Lecture, American Anthropological Association
- 1999 Diana Forsythe Prize, Committee on the Anthropology of Science, Technology & Computing
- 1999 Basker Book Prize, Society for Medical Anthropology
- 1999 Senior Book Prize, American Ethnological Society
- 2003 Staley Prize, School of American Research
