= Brigitte Jordan =

German-American anthropologist

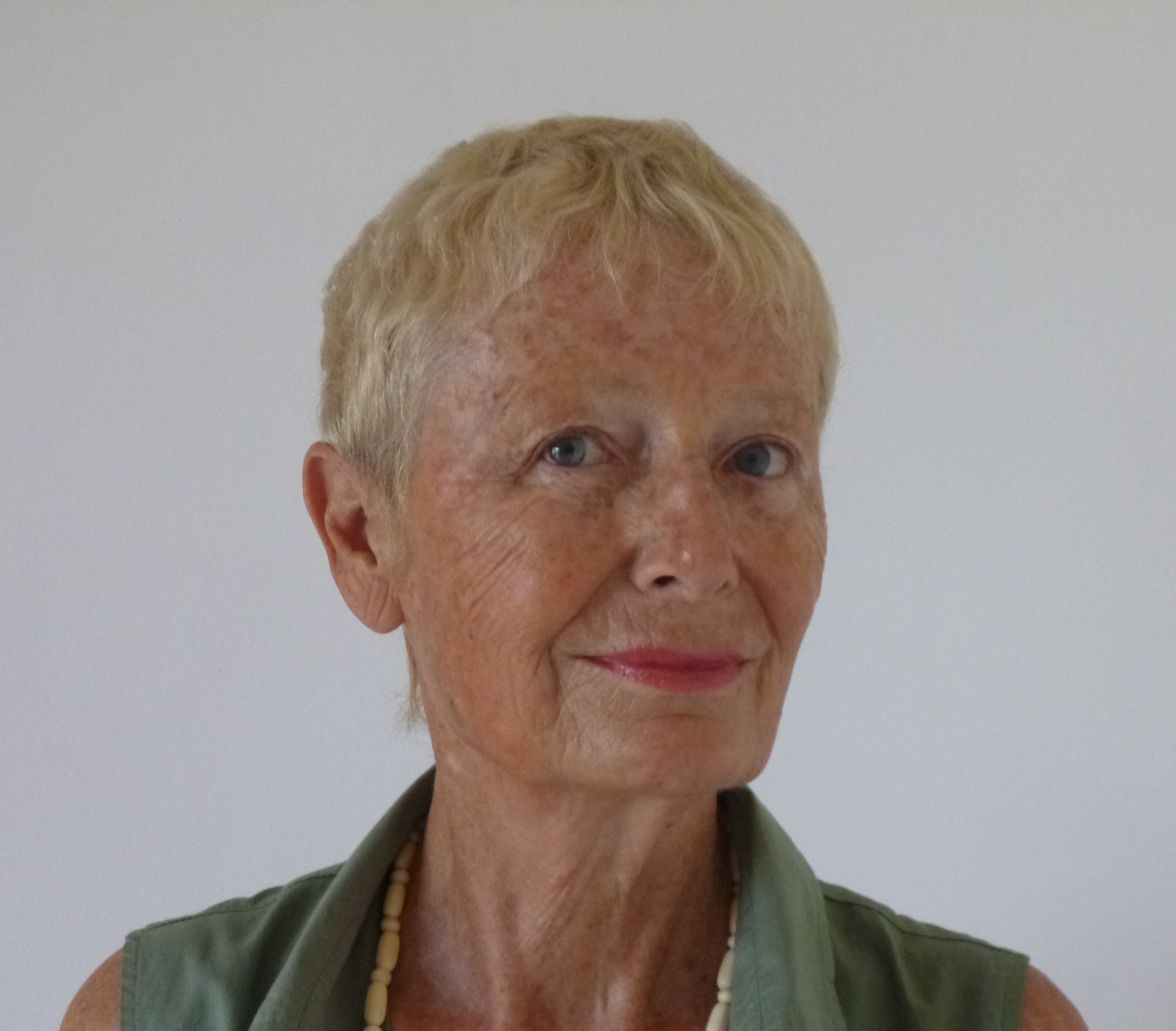
- Born: Passau, Germany
- Died: May 24, 2016; La Honda, California
- Education: PhD at the University of California, Irvine; MA in 1971 from Sacramento State College
- Occupations: Professor at Michigan State University; Principal scientist at the Xerox Palo Alto Research Center; Senior research scientist at the Institute for Research on Learning; Consultant at the Nissan Research Center in Silicon Valley
- Years active: 1970-2015
- Known for: Ethnographic Research in Anthropology of Reproduction
- Notable work: Birth in Four Cultures
- Family: Robert Irwin (husband)
- Awards: Margaret Mead Award of the American Anthropological Association; Excellence in Science and Technology Award from the Xerox Corporation

Brigitte Jordan was a German-American professor, scientist, and consultant who was described as the midwife to the "Anthropology of Birth".

== Early life and education ==
Brigitte "Gitti" Jordan was born in Passau, Germany, in 1937. Her parents were Gertrude Frank Muller, who died in 1944 when Jordan was seven, and Josef Karl Muller.

Jordan earned her B.A. and M.A. degrees in anthropology at California State University, Sacramento, and her Ph.D. in social science/anthropology from University of California, Irvine in 1975.

== Career and later life ==
Jordan spent much of her early career studying obstetrical anthropology and cross-cultural birth practices. Rayna Rapp praised Jordan for her authoritative knowledge of childbirth: "Jordan uses her exquisite sense of description to birth a theoretical framework." Jordan's theoretical concept of authoritative knowledge has been employed by countless scholars to account for the subsuming of some ways of knowing by others and also to show how knowledge can be laterally distributed.

In 1988, Jordan began working as a corporate anthropologist, and her research and consulting interests evolved to include the changing nature of work under the impact of new communication and information technologies and the consequent transformation of ways of life, societal institutions, and global economies.

Jordan later opened her own consulting practice where she held appointments as the principal scientist at the Xerox Palo Alto Research Center and as senior research scientist at the Institute for Research on Learning. This led to her receiving the Excellence in Science and Technology Award from the Xerox Corporation for innovative work.

Jordan's research on the relationship between humans and technology has influenced organizations outside of the field of anthropology, such as the Special Interest Group on Computer-Human Interaction (SIGCHI). She is also credited with the development of corporate anthropology.

== Personal life ==
After marrying Richard Jordan, an American soldier stationed in Germany, in 1958, Jordan came to the United States. There, she gave birth to three children. The couple divorced in 1968 and Jordan married Robert Irwin.

== Later life and death ==
Jordan died of pancreatic cancer in her home on May 24, 2016. She lived to be 78, leaving behind her husband, three children, six grandchildren, and two great-grandchildren. Although Jordan had pancreatic cancer, she made it known to others that she did not want to be treated as incapable because of her condition. She refused medication and remained mentally and intellectually active until the end of her life. She continued to live life in a normalized manner, and helped form her obituary.

The research materials Jordan amassed during her long and varied career are housed at Smith College in the Sophia Smith Collection of Women's History. An online inventory of the Jordan collection is available.

== Career honors ==
Jordan received the Margaret Mead Award in 1980 for her 1978 book Birth in Four Cultures: A Crosscultural Investigation of Childbirth in Yucatan, Holland, Sweden, and the United States. Her work is credited with inspiring a range of responses within the field of reproductive anthropology that integrated her approaches to her examinations of the social, cultural and biological implications of birth around the world. She is known for showing how knowledge can be "laterally distributed," shared by all, and understood by all.

In 2015, Jordan was inducted into the American Anthropological Association's (AAA) Distinguished Member program which honors members who have loyally supported the Association for 50 years or more.

== Works ==
- Die Bedeutung der Fernröntgen-Profil-Aufnahme für die Indikation der kieferorthopädischen Extraktionstherapie (1966) [in German]
- Untersuchung zur einfachen radioimmunologischen Testosteronbestimmung mit einer Kieselgelmikrosäule (1977) [in German]
- Birth in Four Cultures: A Crosscultural Investigation of Childbirth in Yucatan, Holland, Sweden, and the United States (1978) Montreal: Eden Press Women's Publications
- Technology Transfer in Obstetrics: Theory and Practice in Developing Countries (1986) East Lansing, MI: Michigan State University
- Modes of Teaching and Learning: Questions Raised by the Training of Traditional Birth Attendants (1987) Palo Alto, Calif.: Institute for Research on Learning
- Knowing by Doing: Lessons Traditional Midwives Taught Me (1988) East Lansing, MI: Michigan State University
- Successful Home Birth and Midwifery: The Dutch Model (1993) Westport, Conn.: Bergin & Garvey
- Advancing Ethnography in Corporate Environments: Challenges and Emerging Opportunities (2012) Walnut Creek, CA: Left Coast
