= Testing Women, Testing the Fetus =

Book

- Author: Rayna Rapp
- Language: English
- Genre: Non-fiction
- Publication date: 1999

Testing Women, Testing the Fetus by Rayna Rapp is a book, published in 1999, about analysis of the social repercussions of prenatal genetic testing. Rapp combines the data she collected herself with historical context of amniocentesis and genetic counseling to argue that amniocentesis and those abortions following positive test results is a social decision as much as an individual one.

== Methodology of research ==
Beginning with her own prenatal diagnosis experience in 1983, Rapp spent approximately 15 years conducting research on the effects and experiences of genetic testing on women. Her research was spread across various locations in New York City.

Rapp used a method of research known as "participant observation" to gather data for this project. For her, this meant interviewing women, geneticists, and obstetricians; visiting laboratories, and prenatal testing centers; and working alongside advocates for disabled people. The women Rapp interviewed came from a range of religious backgrounds, socioeconomic strata, and positions of societal privilege, all of which she factored into her evaluation of each subject's decision-making process.

== Synopsis ==
Testing Women, Testing the Fetus explains the religious, cultural, racial, class, and scientific influences that impacted the decisions of mothers given positive prenatal diagnoses. These influences ranged from discussions with partners, or lack thereof, to miscommunications between doctors and patients during translation of "technical language into vernacular."

Her project was focused around three primary arguments: that amniocentesis is a contributor to stratified reproduction; that scientific knowledge is used to enforce that stratified social structure; and that society needs to improve communication between the disabled community and the proponents of genetic testing.

Rapp's book begins with a three-chapter introduction to genetic counseling, followed by a chapter analyzing the relationships and potential miscommunications between genetic counselors and their clients. Chapter 5 explores the "waiting period" for women as they anticipate results of amniocentesis testing, and the three chapters after are analyses of cultural and social influences on women's perceptions of disability, prenatal technology, and abortion. Chapter 9 is a reflection on both positive disability diagnoses and the choices women have to make afterwards regarding the continuation of their pregnancy. Rapp concludes her book with a chapter on the medicalization of healthcare for children born with Down syndrome and an introduction to her theme of pregnant women as "moral pioneers."

In her research, Rapp found that women who received a prenatal diagnosis of Down syndrome were quicker to make the decision of whether to terminate the pregnancy or not than those who were given other, sometimes more severe diagnoses. She also discovered that there was a difference in abortion decisions between women with disability diagnoses and those made under other circumstances. Those who made the decision based on other circumstances generally made the decision to abort much earlier in the pregnancy than those with positive diagnoses, due to the fact that women in the latter half had actually intended to carry out the full pregnancy.

== Publishing and editorial history ==
The book was first published in 1999.

== Reception and awards ==
Testing Women, Testing the Fetus has been accepted into both the scientific and anthropological communities. Rapp's book was given numerous awards in 1999, including the Forsythe Book Prize, the Society for Medical Anthropology's Basker Book Prize and the American Ethnological Society's Senior Book Prize. Additionally, Rapp was awarded the J. I. Staley Prize for "outstanding scholarship and writing in anthropology" in 2003. A reviewer for Medical Anthropology Quarterly, Lynn Morgan, said that Rapp was "one of the most eloquent feminist anthropologists writing today."
