= Birth in Four Cultures =

1978 book by Brigitte Jordan

Birth in Four Cultures: A Crosscultural Investigation of Childbirth in Yucatan, Holland, Sweden, and the United States
- First edition
- Author: Brigitte Jordan
- Subject: Childbirth
- Genre: Non-fiction
- Publisher: Eden Books
- Publication date: 1978

Birth in Four Cultures: A Crosscultural Investigation of Childbirth in Yucatan, Holland, Sweden, and the United States is an anthropological study of childbirth by Brigitte Jordan published in 1978.

== Background ==
Throughout the book Jordan explores the birth practices of four different cultures: the Yucatan, Holland, Sweden, and the United States. In chapter four, she explains in detail why she decided to focus her study on childbirth: "I never chose to study birth. In some sense, birth chose me."

== Concept ==
Jordan's work argues against romanticized perspectives of "early, less complex societies" that present childbirth as uncomplicated. Instead, she suggests that childbirth is a life-altering event in all societies, but can be understood differently by using a cross-cultural perspective. In their edited collection, Childbirth and Authoritative Knowledge: Cross-Cultural Perspectives, Robbie E. Davis-Floyd and Carolyn F. Sargent praised the book for focusing "anthropological attention on childbirth as a subject worthy of in-depth ethnographic fieldwork and cross-cultural comparison, and that inspired many others to enter the field."

Jordan argues that birth should be examined utilizing a biosocial approach, which recognizes birth as a biological process that is shaped by social and cultural practices. Along with a concern for medical safety, Jordan also focuses on "maternal attitudes and participation in birth, the birth setting, and the mother's selection of birth attendants." Jordan uses her observations in the field, alongside academic anthropological sources to analyze birth as it occurs in four different societies.

== Field method ==
As an ethnographer, Jordan and her collaborator Nancy Fuller incorporated qualitative and quantitative approaches to compare health policies and statistical data from the four birthing systems. Jordan employed formal and informal interviews based on her participant observation. In particular, she used technological means of data collection, such as videotaping and tape recording devices, to record and review her findings and produce high-quality documentation. Jordan reflects upon the methodological and ethical responsibility in her research to justify the decision-making process of the biosocial framework.

== Reception and recognition ==
=== Honors and awards ===
In 1980, Jordan received the Margaret Mead Award in recognition for Birth in Four Cultures.

=== Academic reviews ===
While much of the reception for Birth in Four Cultures has been overwhelmingly positive, some anthropologists have criticized Jordan for her exclusive focus on the social aspects of birth without much attention to religious or ideological concerns in her research.

Birth in Four Cultures was one of the first ethnographies to study cross-cultural systems of birth. Jordan argued that economics, culture, and politics affect birth as a system, which led to the beginning of the sub-category of anthropology called Anthropology of Birth.

Birth in Four Cultures has been used to advocate for preserving midwifery care in developing countries.

== Updates and editions ==
There have been four editions of the book in 1978, 1980, 1983, and 1993, including updates to the material from Jordan's continued research on the subject. The 4th edition was revised and expanded by anthropologist Robbie Davis-Floyd.
