= Neighbourhood Midwives =

Neighbourhood Midwives was an employee-owned private service in the United Kingdom that partnered with the National Health Service to deliver one-to-one midwifery to expectant mothers in line with government targets to improve antenatal care. In 2015 it was praised in the House of Lords as pioneering by Baroness Cumberlege.

On 31 January 2019, Neighbourhood Midwives shut down with little notice, for unclear reasons. In its last accounts, its liabilities exceeded its assets by over £900,000.
