= Birth as an American Rite of Passage =

1992 non-fiction book by Robbie Davis-Floyd

- Author: Robbie Davis-Floyd
- Language: English
- Publisher: University of California Press
- Publication date: 1992
- Publication place: United States
- ISBN: 9780520074392

Birth as an American Rite of Passage is a book written by Robbie Davis-Floyd and published in 1992. It combines anthropology and first-hand accounts from mothers and doctors into a critical analysis of childbirth in America from a feminist perspective.

It introduces the theme of technocratic medicine as a form of indoctrination into America's patriarchal culture. Davis-Floyd argues that American birthing practices value science over nature, a doctor's knowledge over that of the mother and that many common actions performed by doctors (or the mother) are technocratic rituals – behaviors with limited practical purpose. She cites practices such as obstructing the mother's line of sight to the baby exiting her body by placing a sheet over her lower body. Davis-Floyd believes that society, intimidated by women's ability to give birth, has designed unnecessary rituals in order to make the symbolism of childbirth available to everyone, not just those who can bear children. "In this way," she writes, "society symbolically demonstrates ownership of its product."

== Key concepts ==
=== Technology in birth ===
Major life transitions are often ritualized in a way that is local to a particular society or culture. Pregnancy and childbirth are processes that reflect the traditions, beliefs, and values of the culture in which they take place. Davis-Floyd argues that the emphasis on technological advances that aid pregnancy, create a negative effect surrounding its ideology. The book argues that American society values the knowledge of medical professionals over that of mothers and midwives. Davis-Floyd's model criticizes current tocology and childbirth as overly scientific, technology-motivated methods that can serve to disempower women. Certain medical procedures such as a cesarean section, episiotomy, and the positioning of the woman at the time of birth, are viewed as optimal in American birthing culture. Davis-Floyd argues that these procedures are mainly a result of cultural beliefs, and not for their actual benefits. The same is true of the perception that pregnancy and childbirth require medical oversight and interference. Davis-Floyd claims that the majority of women's favorable views of technological intervention during childbirth are due to doctors' influence. Obstetric procedures act as rituals for pregnant women and medical personnel, with the intention of improving the attitudes of those involved in birthing. For example, when fluids are administered through intravenous therapy, a feeling of security is invoked; a reassuring order is imposed on the event, reinforcing reliance upon others' knowledge.

=== Rite of passage ===
The concept of a rite of passage was coined by ethnographer Arnold van Gennep. Davis-Floyd states that birth as a rite of passage incorporates three essential stages. Through birth, the treatment of the woman's body, and the doctor's implementation of procedures, the rite is enacted within American culture.

=== Stages ===
The three stages are separation, pregnancy and reincorporation. These three stages characterize the rite of passage and are culturally relative to the society within which they function. In some cases four stages apply, and in rare cases, up to ten. However, such cases have never been recorded.

Separation: A phase during which the pregnant woman begins to form a new self-identity as a result of her pregnancy. She separates from her original state of being. In this stage, the woman is now an "other", unlike her old self.

Pregnancy: A phase where the pregnant woman is "in between". She is neither a normal member of society nor a mother. This stage continues until after the birth.

Integration: The woman accepts her new social identity. This phase ends when the woman feels that she is similar to her previous self.

== Reception ==
Reviews of this book praised Davis-Floyd for connecting American childbirth with rituals using an anthropological basis. The book also received criticism for basing its conclusions on interviews with only 100 women who were all well-educated, middle-class and Caucasian.
