= Pregnancy Justice =

US non-profit organization

- Types: nonprofit organization
- Legal status: 501(c)(3) organization
- Headquarters: New York City
- Country: United States
- Coordinates: 40°45′18″N 73°59′30″W
- Revenue: 2,593,376 United States dollar (2019)
- Total Assets: 7,432,150 United States dollar (2021)
- Website: www.pregnancyjusticeus.org

Pregnancy Justice is a 501(c)(3) organization "dedicated to defending the rights of pregnant people against criminalization and other rights violations because of pregnancy and all pregnancy outcomes." It was founded in 2001 by Lynn Paltrow as National Advocates for Pregnant Women (NAPW), supporting pro-choice. They changed their name to "Pregnancy Justice" November 15, 2022. Their work has included documenting "over 1,700 cases of pregnancy-related arrests, detentions and equivalent deprivations of physical liberty from 1973 to 2020."

== Precursor ==
Roughly 14 years before founding NAPW, Paltrow defended Pamela Rae Stewart, a woman from El Cajon, 17 miles (27 km) east of downtown San Diego, California, who had been jailed for six days on charges that she contributed to her infant son's death by ignoring a doctor's orders during pregnancy. On February 26, 1987, a San Diego Municipal Court judge "ruled that the San Diego County district attorney’s office erred in using a law concerning child support to prosecute Stewart for failing to provide proper medical care for her unborn son." "The boy was born brain dead Nov. 23, 1985, and died Jan. 1, 1986. A coroner's report lists maternal drug abuse as a contributing factor in the death." Paltrow was part of the American Civil Liberties Union’s Reproductive Freedom Project at that time.

== Recognition ==
The work of NAPW, now Pregnancy Justice, has been cited as background in discussing prosecutions of multiple women for miscarriages, stillbirths, or other problems with pregnancy. For example, in January 2020 Brittney Poolaw miscarried her four-month old fetus in Oklahoma. In October 2021 she was convicted of manslaughter and sentenced to four years in prison, because she had been using illicit drugs when pregnant. A BBC News report on that sentence noted that the National Advocates of Pregnant Women (NAPW) had recorded 1,600 such cases between 1973 and 2020, "with about 1,200 occurring in the last 15 years alone."

Almost a year later Chelsea Becker began talking publicly about her experience with 16 months in jail in King County, California, before charges were dismissed "for lack of evidence", after a pregnancy ended in a stillbirth in 2019. During that pregnancy she had been homeless and addicted to methamphetamine, for which she was charged with "murdering her unborn son at 38 weeks of pregnancy." An ABC News discussion of Ms. Becker's case noted that by that time, September 28, 2021, NAPW had documented over 1,700 such cases since 1973.

== When and where is a fetus a person? ==
A December 2022 report by Pregnancy Justice provides a detailed review (62 pages with 416 footnotes) carefully documenting the status of fetal personhood and its implications in the US. For example, Missouri law declares that life begins at conception. That raise multiple questions, including whether the failure to implant a fertilized egg can be prosecuted as murder. GOP efforts to classify a fertilized ovum as a person elsewhere have met with limited success because of the popularity of in vitro fertilization (IVF). However, Pregnancy Justice urges their supporters to be vigilant about this issue.

When a six month old fetus was killed with its mother in 2021, the Missouri Department of Transportation (MODOT) said that fetus was an employee, because the mother was on duty as a MODOT employee at the time, and Missouri law shields employers from wrongful death lawsuits when an employee dies on the job.
