= Robbie Davis-Floyd =

American anthropologist (born 1951)

Robbie Davis-Floyd (born Robbie Elizabeth Davis; April 26, 1951) is an American cultural, medical, and reproductive anthropologist, researcher, author, and international speaker primarily known for her research on childbirth, midwifery, and obstetrics. She has argued that midwives play an important role in safeguarding positive outcomes for women giving birth. Beginning in 1983, she has given over 1000 presentations at universities and childbirth, midwifery, and obstetric conferences around the world.

== Work ==
In Davis-Floyd's first book, Birth as an American Rite of Passage, she defines a "technocracy" as a society organized around the super-valuation of high technologies and the global flow of information. She argues that the beliefs and practices associated with birth are driven from a "technocratic model" that was influenced by the Industrial Revolution. Birth became industrialized in assembly-line fashion, then "technocratized" by the consistent use of high technologies such as ultrasound and the electronic fetal monitor, which is almost universally used in American births, even though it has been shown to fail to improve outcomes while increasing the cesarean section rate. The publication of the book furthered her interest to study the anthropology of reproduction. Her current focus is on transformational models of maternity care around the world, and on assisting in the humanistic transformation of childbirth via the International Childbirth Initiative described below.

Within their scope of research, Davis-Floyd, other scholars and other birth advocates have documented information on birth, childbirth processes, cultural perspectives, birth customs, safety practices, and health resources. Her primary work in this arena has been to serve as lead editor for the International MotherBaby Childbirth Initiative (IMBCI): 10 Steps to Optimal Maternity Care (2008) and then to serve as lead editor for the International Childbirth Initiative (ICI): 12 Steps to Safe and Respectful Maternity Care (2018), which is a merger of the IMBCI and the 2015 FIGO Guidelines to Mother-Baby-Friendly Birthing Facilities and replaces both the IMBCI and the FIGO Guidelines. The ICI states that the goal of the global implementations of its 12 steps should be fully implemented in every birthing facility worldwide.

In light of her mission and collaborative studies, Davis-Floyd has collaborated with multiple people to explain birth in different contexts and parts of the world. For example, Davis-Floyd and midwife Elizabeth Davis co-authored Intuition as Authoritative Knowledge in Midwifery and Homebirth. Both examined the interactions among midwives' authoritative knowledge and their trust in their own intuition and in the intuition of women giving birth. This form of authoritative knowledge occurs in a context where independent midwives rely on knowledge that they spiritually and personally embody, primarily through expertise and by knowing the women within the context of their communities. Home birth midwives make a conscious and purposeful attempt to provide alternative knowledge that is scientifically accurate and culturally appropriate. In Cyborg Babies, Davis-Floyd and Dumit show that new reproductive technologies can create a barrier between mother and child, in regards to visualization, conception, and legislation. Reproductive technologies have been analyzed for their merits and paradoxes as they make advancements in cross-cultural landscapes. Cyborg Babies demonstrates that human cyborgs can be both technological and organic—for example, one of its chapters describes an IVF conception ending in a holistic homebirth.

Davis-Floyd's primary theoretical contributions include her analysis of standard obstetric procedures for birth as rituals that convey the core values of the technocracy and her delineation and comparison of the "technocratic, humanistic, and holistic models/paradigms of childbirth and health care." These different models of birth, health care, and technological usages exist in all societies and fluctuate according to the surrounding cultural and social conditions.

Another primary contribution was her 1993 complete revision and update of Brigitte Jordan's Birth in Four Cultures: A Cultural Investigation of Childbirth in Yucatan, Holland, Sweden, and the United States (Fourth Edition)—the book that generated the fields of the anthropologies of midwifery and childbirth. This book was first published in 1978 and won the Margaret Mead Award in 1980. Jordan and Davis-Floyd completed a comparative analysis on how culture interacts with the physiology of birth in four different territories, showing how birth is everywhere socially marked and shaped. Brigitte Jordan's concept of authoritative knowledge has been promoted by Davis-Floyd in her update of Birth in Four Cultures, in her co-edited 1997 collection Childbirth and Authoritative Knowledge: Cross-Cultural Perspectives, and in her 2019 co-edited collection Birth in Eight Cultures, which was designed with Jordan's encouragement to replace Birth in Four Cultures for undergraduate and graduate teaching. This concept has been distributed and utilized by scholars around the world. By Jordan's definition, authoritative knowledge is the knowledge that counts in a given situation, on the basis of which people make decisions and take actions. It often subsists in a hierarchy of knowledge systems in which one holds more weight than the other. A system comes to carry more weight when it has a superior purpose to explain a state of the world or greater hegemonic force because it is held by people in power. Both anthropologists have acknowledged the use and spread of high technologies as a cultural factor of authoritative knowledge. The use of technologies has contributed to a new symbiosis between humans and machines, the study of which is termed "Cyborg Anthropology." Anthropologist Donna Haraway proposed this new discipline, later utilized by Joseph Dumit of MIT and Robbie Davis-Floyd in 1998. Davis-Floyd's research concerns reproduction and the technologies associated with birthing standards; she has shown in many publications how standard obstetric procedures serve as rituals that convey the core values of technocratic society to birthing women and practitioners alike. She has also analyzed medical training as a rite of technocratic initiation.

== Personal ==
Davis-Floyd was born in Casper, Wyoming and is the daughter of Walter Gray Davis (an independent oil operator) and Robbie Elizabeth Davis (a homemaker and genealogist) whose maiden name was Peyton. In 1979, she married Robert N. Floyd (an architect) and later became a mother of two children, Peyton and Jason. Their daughter Peyton was killed in a car wreck in 2000 at the age of 20.

== Education ==
Robbie Davis-Floyd was Valedictorian of her high school class at St. Mary's Hall in San Antonio, Texas. She attended Wellesley College between 1969 and 1970, then transferred to the University of Texas at Austin. Davis-Floyd received her Bachelor of Arts from the University of Texas at Austin in 1972 (summa cum laude and with Special Honors in Plan II). She earned her Master of Arts degree in anthropology and folklore (1974), as well as her PhD (1986) from the University of Texas.

== Career ==
Robbie Davis-Floyd has served in the Department of Anthropology at the University of Texas at Austin in various capacities since 1992, most recently as Senior Research Fellow. She has held adjunct and visiting positions at several institutions, including the University of Tennessee at Chattanooga (1980–1983), Trinity University (1987–1989), Rice University (1993–1999), Baylor Medical School (1999), Southern Methodist University (2002), and Case Western Reserve University, where she was the Flora Stone Mather Visiting Professor in Anthropology (2002–2003).

== Membership ==
Robbie Davis-Floyd is a member of the American Anthropological Association, American Holistic Medical Association, Association for Feminist Anthropology, the American College of Nurse-Midwives, and the Midwives Alliance of North America (MANA). Davis-Floyd served as consumer representative to the Board of the North American Registry of Midwives (NARM) for 15 years and on the Midwifery Certification Task Force (1994–1997). Davis-Floyd was chair of the editorial committee of the Coalition for Improving Maternity Services, helping to create the Mother-Friendly Childbirth Initiative for the US (1995). Currently, Davis-Floyd is a member of the board of the International MotherBaby Childbirth Organization (IMBCO) and lead editor for the International MotherBaby Childbirth Initiative. She has served as an executive board member and program chair of the Society for Medical Anthropology (SMA), from 2004 to 2007. Robbie Davis-Floyd was a founding member of the Council on Anthropology and Reproduction and currently serves as its senior advisor. She was also a member of the Council on the Anthropology of Science, Technology, and Computing, the Society for the Social Study of Science, and a board member of the Association for Pre- and Perinatal Psychology and Health for 19 years. She is listed in Who's Who in America, Who's Who in American Women, and Who's Who in the World.

Davis-Floyd serves as lead editor for a book series on "Social Science Perspectives on Birth and Reproduction" for Routledge, which includes Birthing Models on the Human Rights Frontier, The Global Witch Hunt, and Birth as an American Rite of Passage.

== Publications ==
=== Books ===
- Davis-Floyd, Robbie. Birth As An American Rite Of Passage. Berkeley: University of California Press, 1992.
- Jordan, Brigitte. Birth in Four Cultures: A Crosscultural Investigation of Childbirth in Yucatan, Holland, Sweden, and the United States, Fourth Edition. Waveland Press, 1993. Revised, expanded, and updated by Robbie Davis-Floyd.
- Davis-Floyd, Robbie E., and Carolyn Sargent. Childbirth and Authoritative Knowledge: Cross-Cultural Perspectives. University of California Press, 1997.
- Davis-Floyd, Robbie and P. Sven Arvidson, eds. Intuition: The Inside Story. New York: Routledge, 1997.
- Davis-Floyd, Robbie, and Joseph Dumit, eds. Cyborg Babies: From Techno-Sex to Techno-Tots. Routledge, New York, 1998.
- Davis-Floyd, Robbie, and Gloria St John. From Doctor to Healer: The Transformative Journey. New Brunswick, NJ: Rutgers University Press, 1998.
- Bourgeault, Ivy Lynn, et al., editors. Reconceiving Midwifery. McGill-Queen's University Press, 2004.
- Davis-Floyd, Robbie and Christine Barbara Johnson, eds. Mainstreaming Midwives: The Politics of Change. New York: Routledge, 2006.
- Davis-Floyd, Robbie, et al., editors. Birth Models That Work. 1st ed., University of California Press, 2009.
- Davis-Floyd, Robbie, Kenneth J. Cox, and Frank White. Space Stories: Oral Histories from the Pioneers of America's Space Program, Kindle e-book, 2012.
- Davis-Floyd, Robbie and Charles Laughlin. The Power of Ritual. Brisbane, Australia: Daily Grail Press.
- Davis-Floyd, Robbie and Colleagues. Ways of Knowing about Birth: Mothers, Midwives, Medicine, and Birth Activism. Long Grove, IL: Waveland Press, 2018.
- Davis-Floyd, Robbie, and Melissa Cheyney. Birth in Eight Cultures. Long Grove, IL: Waveland Press, 2019.
- Daviss, Betty-Anne and Robbie Davis-Floyd, eds. Birthing Models on the Human Rights Frontier: Speaking Truth to Power. New York and London: Routledge 2020.
- Gutschow, Kim, Robbie Davis-Floyd, and Betty-Anne Daviss. Sustainable Birth. Springer, 2020.
- Daviss, Betty-Anne, Hermine Hayes-Klein, and Robbie Davis-Floyd, eds. The Global Witch Hunt Plaguing Birth: Practitioner Persecution and Restorative Resistance. In process.
- Davis-Floyd, Robbie and Beverly Chalmers, eds. Birthing Techno-Sapiens: Human-Technology Co-Evolution and the Future of Reproduction.Routledge 2021.

Davis-Floyd Robbie and Premkumar Ashish. The Anthropology of Obstetrics and Obstetricians: The Practice, Maintenance, and Reproduction of a Biomedical Profession, a Three Volume Series. Volume I. Davis-Floyd Robbie and Premkumar Ashish. Obstetricians Speak: On Training, Practice, Fear, and Transformation. Berghahn Books, 2023. Volume II. Davis-Floyd Robbie and Premkumar Ashish. Cognition, Risk, and Responsibility in Obstetrics: Anthropological Analyses and Critiques of Obstetricians' Practices. Berghahn Books, 2023. Volume III. Davis-Floyd Robbie and Premkumar Ashish. Obstetric Violence and Systemic Disparities: Can Obstetrics Be Humanized and Decolonized? Berghahn Books 2023.

- Unnithan Maya, Davis-Floyd Robbie, Majumdar Anidita, and Richard Powis. Exploring Reproduction: Anthropological Perspectives. Routledge 2026.

== Awards and honors ==
Robbie Davis-Floyd is a fellow of the Society for Applied Anthropology at the University of Texas, Austin. She was a fellow of the National Endowment for the Humanities in 1980 and received faculty development grants from Trinity University (1988–1989). She was recognized as a research fellow from the University of Texas in 1994 and was an Academy of Consciousness Studies fellow at Princeton University the same year. She received the Institute of Noetic Sciences grant (1995–1997) and the American Society for Psychoprophylaxis in Obstetrics & Lamaze Research Award in 1996. In 1996–1998 and 1999–2000, she received two Wenner-Gren Foundation for Anthropological Research grants, as well as multiple research grants from the American Institute of Aeronautics and Astronautics and the Honeywell Corporation for "Space Stories: Oral Histories from the Pioneers of the American Space Program." In 2003, she and Carolyn Sargent received the Enduring Edited Collection Book Prize from the Council on Anthropology and Reproduction for Childbirth and Authoritative Knowledge. She received Transforming Birth Fund Grant Awards in 2005, 2006, and 2007. In 2010, she received an "Homenagem" from ReHuNa, a birth activist organization in Brazil, presented by the Brazilian Minister of Health for her work defining the technocratic, humanistic, and holistic paradigms of birth and health care. In 2012, she was honored with an award from MANA for her years of service to American midwifery.
