= Carolyn Sargent =

Medical anthropologist

Carolyn Sargent is an American medical anthropologist who is Professor Emerita of Sociocultural Anthropology and of Women, Gender, and Sexuality Studies at Washington University in St. Louis. Sargent was the director of women's studies at Southern Methodist University from 2000–2008. Sargent served as president of the Society for Medical Anthropology for 2008–2010 and 2011–2012.

Her work focuses on gender studies and health issues, with interests in sexual and reproductive health, managing the health of women in low-income families, and decision making in the medical field. She has done fieldwork in Benin and Mali in West Africa, Jamaica and the Caribbean, and with immigrant women in France where she worked on reproductive health, midwifery, prenatal care, migrant fertility patterns, and medical decision-making.

Sargent has served on the Ethics Committees of the Barnes Jewish Hospital, Baylor University Medical Center and Parkland Memorial Hospital. Sargent admires the French medical insurance system for its attempt to guarantee the right to health care under the French constitution. She has examined the ways in which the French health care system may be changing, in response to debates about entitlement and deservingness, affecting the immigrant experience of health care. Sargent has called upon anthropologists to learn about and become involved with national health care issues. In an issue of the Medical Anthropology Quarterly, speaking as the president of the Society for Medical Anthropology, Sargent asked that anthropologists help to, "shape public discourses and policy in ways we have rarely done before."

== Education ==
Carolyn Fishel (later Sargent) was born to Dr. and Mrs. Wesley Fishel, of Okemos. In 1968, Carolyn Helen Fishel graduated from Michigan State University with High Honors and a Bachelor of Arts. She majored in Japanese, French and international studies and was a member of Phi Beta Kappa. However, in her senior year of college took anthropology classes, and a professor suggested that she earn a graduate degree in anthropology. Sargent received a Marshall Scholarship, which finances up to forty young Americans annually to study at the University of Manchester. In 1970, she received her M.A. for social anthropology.

In 1971, Carolyn Fishel married Merritt W. Sargent of East Lansing, and joined him at a base in Natitingou, West Africa to work on a Peace Corps project. The project trained Dahomeyan farmers to use a working animal such as oxen instead of cultivating crops by hand. Carolyn researched what kind of people invested in the oxen, what types of supplies they required and how much it would cost. Her experiences with a local maternity clinic spurred her interest in maternal and child health, which she studied in her Ph.D. work, returning to West Africa. In 1979, she received her Ph.D. in anthropology at Michigan State University.

== Career ==
From 1980 to 1985 Sargent was an assistant professor at Southern Methodist University (SMU). She became an associate professor in 1985 and in 1990 became a representative for the Texas Committee on Health Objectives for the 90's sponsored by the Department of Public Health. She became a full professor at SMU in 1992 and director of the Women's Studies Program at SMU in 1994. In 2008 she became a professor in Arts and Sciences at Washington University in St. Louis, in the department of anthropology's Women, Gender, Sexuality Studies Program. She was the president of the Society of Medical Anthropology (SMA) for 2008–2010 and 2011–2012.

As president, Sargent proposed the formation of an SMA Task Force on national health insurance, to examine national health care policy and make recommendations on health care reform to policy-makers. She encouraged anthropologists to look at ways to make their research more available to policy makers. Most information is available in the form of (unread) articles and books. Sargent had the idea that the Medical Anthropology Student Association and Medical Anthropology Graduate Association could compile annotated digests and shorter versions of articles and books for policy-makers. She also suggested that anthropologists could work with legislators to do "research on demand" and examine potential policy changes.

== Research ==
During her time in the Peace Corps, Sargent worked in a maternity clinic that primarily catered to elite women. Sargent began collecting data on baby weights despite disapproval from the midwives working in the clinic. Along with observations compiled over her three-year service this became the focus of her graduate research on reproductive health.

Over the years, Sargent's interests expanded to include medical ethics, immigrant health and the ways in which state institutions interact with the healthcare system and the provision of care.

== Additional experience ==
- Ethics Committee, Barnes Jewish Hospital
- 2003—Community Representative, Parkland Memorial Hospital Ethics Committee
- 1999—Community Representative, Baylor Institutional Ethics Committee

== Honors ==
- 1975: Rockefeller-Ford Program of Social Science, Humanistic, and Legal Research on Population Policy Award, with EUSEBE ALIHOUNOU.
- 2003: Enduring Edited Collection Book Prize, Council on Anthropology and Reproduction, SMA (for Childbirth and Authoritative Knowledge, with Robbie Davis-Floyd)
- 2005: Ford Senior Research Award, SMU
- 2006: Rockefeller Foundation Bellagio Grant, Wenner-Gren Foundation for Anthropological Research Grant
- 2012: Eileen Basker Memorial Prize (with Carole Browner of UCLA) for Reproduction, Globalization, and the State: New Theoretical and Ethnographic Perspectives
- 2012: Council for Anthropology and Reproduction (CAR) Most Notable Recent Collection Award (with Carole Browner of UCLA) for Reproduction, Globalization, and the State: New Theoretical and Ethnographic Perspectives

== Publications ==
=== Monographs ===
- 1982: The Cultural Context for Therapeutic Choice: Obstetrical Care Decisions in a Bariba Community. Dordrecht, Holland: D. Reidel Publishing Company, Inc. Edited Volumes.
- 1989: Maternity, Medicine and Power: Reproductive Decisions in Urban Benin. Berkeley: University of California Press.

=== Edited volumes ===
- 1990: (with Thomas Johnson) Medical Anthropology: A Handbook of Theory and Method. Westport, Connecticut: Greenwood Press (Praeger, paperback).
- 1993: (with Caroline Brettell) Gender in Cross-Cultural Perspective. Englewood Cliffs, New Jersey: Prentice-Hall.
- 1996: (with Caroline Brettell) Gender and Health. Englewood Cliffs, New Jersey: Prentice-Hall.
- 1996: (with Thomas Johnson) Medical Anthropology: A Handbook of Theory and Method. Second Ed., Revised. Westport, Connecticut: Greenwood/Praeger.
- 1997: (with Robbie Davis-Floyd) Childbirth and Authoritative Knowledge. Berkeley: University of California Press.
- 1997: (with Caroline Brettell) Gender in Cross-Cultural Perspective, Second Edition, Revised. Englewood Cliffs, New Jersey: Prentice-Hall.
- 1998: (with Nancy Scheper-Hughes) Small Wars: The Cultural Politics of Childhood. Berkeley: University of California Press.
- 2009: (with Caroline Brettell) Gender in Cross-Cultural Perspective, Fifth Edition, Revised. Englewood Cliffs, New Jersey: Prentice-Hall.
- 2010: (with Carole Browner) Reproduction, Globalization, and the State. Duke University Press.

=== Edited journal issues ===
- 1992: (with Linda Whiteford) Historical Antecedents of Contemporary Medical Systems in The Caribbean. Social Science and Medicine Special Issue 35(10).
- 1996: (with Robbie Davis-Floyd, guest editors) The Social Production of Authoritative Knowledge in Childbirth. Medical Anthropology Quarterly Special Issue, June.
- 2006: (with Caroline Brettell, guest editors) Migration, Identity, and Citizenship: Anthropological Perspectives. American Behavioral Scientist 50(1). 5
- 2006: (C. Sargent, guest editor) Medical Anthropology in the Muslim World. Medical Anthropology Quarterly Special Issue 20(2)..

=== Articles ===
- 1984: Between Death and Shame. Dimensions of Pain in Bariba Culture. Special Issue, Social Science and Medicine 19(12):1299–1304.
- 1984: (with John Marcucci) Aspects of Khmer Medicine Among Refugees in Dallas. Medical Anthropology Quarterly 16:1, pp. 7–9.
- 1984: Obstetrical Choice Among Urban Women in Benin. Social Science and Medicine 20(3):287–292.
- 1985: (with Thomas Johnson and Margot Wilson) Contraceptive Decision-Making. Advances in Contraceptive Delivery Systems. Monograph 1:158–170.
- 1986: (with David Freidel) From Clay to Metal: Culture Change and Container Usage among the Bariba of Northern Benin, West Africa. African Archaeological Review, 177–195.
- 1986: (with Ronald Wetherington and Carol McKinney) Socioeconomic Status and the Incidence of Low Birthweight among the Bariba of Benin. East African Medical Journal: 91–98.
- 1987: (with Nancy Stark) Surgical Birth: Interpretations of Cesarean Delivery among Private Hospital Patients and Nursing Staff. Social Science and Medicine 25(12):1269–76.
- 1988: Witchcraft and Infanticide in Bariba Culture. Ethnology 27(1):79–95.
- 1989: (with Nancy Stark) Childbirth Education and Childbirth Models: Parental Perspectives on Control, Anesthesia, and Technological Intervention in The Birth Process. Medical Anthropology Quarterly 3:1(NS):36-51.
- 1990: (with Joan Rawlins) Factors Influencing Prenatal Care Use among Low-Income Jamaican Women. Research Report Number 14. Washington, D.C.: ICRW.
- 1991: Factors Influencing Prenatal Care among Low-Income Jamaican Women. Human Organization 50(2):179–188.
- 1992: (with Michael Harris) Gender Ideology, Child Care, and Child Health in Jamaica. American Ethnologist 19(3):523–537.
- 1992: (with Joan Rawlins) Transformations in Maternity Care in Jamaica. Social Science and Medicine 35(10):1225–1233.
- 1992: Gender, Reproduction, and Health Care: Comparative Perspectives. Reviews in Anthropology 263–273.
- 2002: Polygamy, Disrupted Reproduction and the State: The Case of Malian Migrants in France. Social Science and Medicine 56(2003):1961–1972.
- 2002: Patient and Physician Explanatory Models for Acute Bronchitis. Journal of Family Practice 51(12):1035–1040.
- 2003: Gender, Body, Meaning: Anthropological Perspectives on Self-Injury and Borderline Personality. Philosophy, Psychiatry, & Psychology 10(1): 25–29.
- 2003: Birth. In Carol and Melvin Ember, eds. Encyclopedia of Medical Anthropology. Plenum.
- 2005: (with Stephanie Larchanche and Samba Yatera) The Evolution of Telecommunications in the Context of Transnational Migration. Paris: Hommes et Migrations 1256:131–140.
- 2005: Counseling Contraception for Malian Migrants in Paris: Global, State, and Personal Politics. Human Organization 64(2):147–156.
- 2006: Liminal Lives: Immigration Status, Gener, and the Construction of Identities among Malian Migrants in Paris. American Behavioral Scientist. 50(1):9–27 (with Stephanie Larchanche-Kim).
- 2006: Reproductive Strategies and Islamic Discourse: Malian Migrants Negotiate Everyday Life in Paris, France. In Medical Anthropology in the Muslim World. Medical Anthropology Quarterly Special Issue 20(1): 31–50.
- 2006: (with Carolyn Smith-Morris) Questioning Our Principles: Anthropological Contributions to Ethical Dilemmas in Clinical Practice. Cambridge Quarterly of Healthcare Ethics 15(2), Spring.
- 2006: Lamenting the Winter of French Fertility. Curare 29 (1), Special Issue. Viola Hoerbst and Sylvie Schuster eds.
- 2007: (with Stephanie Larchanche) The Muslim Body and the Politics of Immigration in France: Popular and Biomedical Representations of Malian Migrant Women. Body and Society, Sage Press. Special Issue 13(3), Islam and the Body.
- 2007: When the Personal is Political: Contested Reproductive Strategies among West African Migrants in France. In Reproductive disruptions: Gender, Technology, and Biopolitics in the New Millennium. Marcia Inhorn, ed. pp. 165–183. Berghahn Books.
- 2009: The Construction of “Cultural Difference” and Its Therapeutic Significance in Immigrant Mental Health Services in France. Culture, Medicine, Psychiatry 33:2–20 (with Stephanie Larchanche).

=== Book chapters ===
- 1981: Solitary Confinement: Birth Practices Among the Bariba of Benin. In An Anthropology of Human Birth. Margarita Kay, ed. Philadelphia: F. A. Davis Company.
- 1985: Witches, Merchants and Midwives: Domains of Power Among Bariba Women. In African Healing Strategies. Brian du Toit and Ismail H. Abdalla, eds. Buffalo: Trado-Medic Books, pp. 96–107.
- 1986: Prospects for the Professionalization of Indigenous Midwifery. In The Professionalization of African Medicine. M. Last and G. Chavunduka, eds. London: Manchester University Press for the International African Institute, pp. 137–149.
- 1988: (with John Marcucci) Khmer Prenatal Health Practices and The American Clinical Experience. In Karen Michaelson (ed.), The Culture of Childbirth. New York: Bergin and Garvey Publishing Co.
- 1989: Women's Roles and Women Healers. In Carol McClain (ed.) Women Healers. New Jersey: Rutgers Press.
- 1990: Pain and the Management of Reproduction. In Penn Handwerker (ed.) The Politics of Reproduction, pp. 69–81. Boulder: Westview Press.
- 1990 [1996]: (with Carole Browner) Anthropology and Reproduction. In Thomas Johnson and Carolyn Sargent (eds.) Medical Anthropology: A Handbook of Theory and Method, pp. 215–230. Westport, Connecticut: Greenwood Press.
- 1996: (with Caroline Brettell) Introduction. In Carolyn Sargent and Caroline Brettell (eds.) Gender and Health. pp. 1–29. Englewood Cliff, New Jersey: Prentice Hall.
- 1997: (with Grace Bascope) Ways of Knowing about Birth in Three Cultures. In Robbie David-Floyd and Carolyn Sargent (eds.) Childbirth and Authoritative Knowledge. pp. 183–209. Berkeley: University of California Press.
- 1998: Bad Boys and Good Girls: Gender and Child Health in Jamaica. In Nancy Scheper-Hughes and Carolyn Sargent, eds. Small Wars: The Cultural Politics of Childhood. pp. 202–228. Berkeley: University of California Press.
- 1998: (with Ruth Wilson, Constance Binde, and Kouame Kale) Prospects for Family Planning in Côte d'Ivoire: Ethnographic Contributions to the Development of Culturally Appropriate Population Policy. In Robert Hahn, Ed. Anthropology in Public and International Health, Oxford University press.
- 2005: (with Carole Browner) Donner un Genre a l’Anthropologie Medicale (Engendering Medical Anthropology). In Anthropologie de la Sante et de la Maladie: Perspectives Internationales et Enjeux Contemporains/Anthropology of Health and Illness. International Perspectives and Current Debates. Francine Saillant and Serge Genest, eds. Quebec: Presses Universite Laval; Paris: Anthropos/Economica. English edition forthcoming, Blackwell.
- 2005: (with Dennis Cordell) Islam, Identity and Gender in Daily Life among Malians in France. In L’Islam Politique au Sud du Sahara. Identites, Discours et Enjeux. Muriel Gomez-Perez, ed,. pp. 177–209. Paris: Karthala.
- 2009: Situating Childbirth in the Anthropology of Reproduction (with Lauren Gulbas). In Companion to Medical Anthropology, Pamela Erickson and Merrill Singer, eds. Blackwell.
