= Elizabeth Davis (midwife) =

American author and women's health care specialist

Elizabeth Davis is an author, women's health care specialist, educator, consultant, and Certified Professional Midwife (CPM). She is a resident of Sebastopol, California and a mother of three children. Since 1977, Davis has pioneered a professional path for midwives in the United States while educating women around the world. Davis is globally active as an expert on midwifery and reproductive health issues. She has been involved with midwifery education, legalization, and the battle for professional autonomy. She lectures on reproductive rights, sexuality, and healing birth trauma.

Davis has discussed information on controversial birth routines and how birth occurs on different levels of emotion and care, particularly in her 2019 revision of "Heart and Hands: A Midwife's Guide to Pregnancy and Birth, 5th edition." Davis has written other books including: "Energetic Pregnancy," "Women's Intuition," "The Rhythms of Women's Desire: How Female Sexuality Unfolds at Every Stage of Life," "Orgasmic Birth: Your Guide to a Safe, Satisfying and Pleasurable Birth Experience" (co-authored with Debra Pascali-Bonaro), and "The Women's Wheel of Life" (co-authored with Carol Leonard).

== Education ==
Davis completed her midwifery apprenticeship training between 1977 and 1978. Elizabeth Davis received a degree in 1980 from Holistic Maternity Care at Antioch University. Davis is certified by the North American Registry of Midwives (NARM).

== Career ==
Davis was a representative to the Midwives Alliance of North America (MANA) for five consecutive years. She served as president for the Midwifery Education Accreditation Council (MEAC). Davis is Co-Founder and Co-Director of the National Midwifery Institute Inc. The institution is a MEAC accredited, apprenticeship-based midwifery program. The program qualifies students for midwifery licensure in California and the CPM credential. Davis teaches Heart & Hands Midwifery Intensives, available in onsite and online formats, either as a freestanding course or as part of the curriculum for National Midwifery Institute.

== Publications ==
- Davis, Elizabeth. Heart & Hands: A Midwife's Guide to Pregnancy and Birth, 5th edition. Berkeley, CA: Ten Speed Press, 2012, update 2019.
- Davis, Elizabeth. The Rhythms of Women's Desire: How Female Sexuality Unfolds at Every Stage of Life. Albany, CA: Hunter House Publishers, 2013.
- Davis, Elizabeth, and Carol Leonard. The Women's Wheel of Life: Thirteen Archetypes of Woman and Her Fullest Power. Maine: Bad Beaver Press, 2012.
- Davis E, Pascali-Bonaro D. Orgasmic Birth: Your Guide to a Safe, Satisfying, and Pleasurable Birth Experience. NY: Rodale Books; 2010.
- Davis-Floyd, Robbie, and Elizabeth Davis. “Intuition as Authoritative Knowledge in Midwifery and Homebirth.” Medical Anthropology Quarterly, vol. 10, no. 2, 1996.

== Awards ==
Davis and Shannon Anton, CPM, were given Brazen Woman Awards by the California Association of Midwives, 2004.

Davis was given a Lifetime Achievement Award by Midwifery Today, at a conference in Germany, 2016.
