= Prenatal care =

Medical check-ups during pregnancy

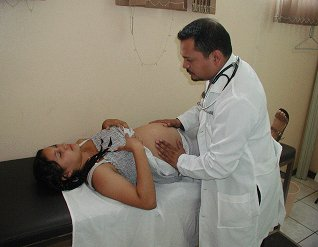
- A doctor performs a prenatal exam.

Prenatal care, also known as antenatal care, is a type of preventive healthcare for pregnant women. It is provided in the form of medical checkups and healthy lifestyle recommendations for the pregnant person. Antenatal care also consists of educating the pregnant woman or girl about maternal physiological and biological changes in pregnancy, along with prenatal nutrition, all of which prevent potential health problems throughout the pregnancy and promote good health for the parent and the fetus. The availability of routine prenatal care, including prenatal screening and diagnosis, has played a part in reducing the frequency of maternal death, miscarriages, birth defects, low birth weight, neonatal infections, and other preventable health problems.

== Visits ==
Traditional prenatal care in high-income countries generally consists of:

- monthly visits during the first two trimesters (from the 1st week to the 28th week)
- fortnightly visits from the 28th week to the 36th week of pregnancy
- weekly visits after 36th week to the delivery, from the 38th week to the 42nd week
- Assessment of parental needs and family dynamics

The WHO recommends that pregnant women receive at least eight antenatal visits to spot and treat problems and give immunizations. Although antenatal care is important to improve the health of both mother and baby, many women do not receive the recommended eight visits. There is little evidence behind the number of antenatal visits pregnant women receive and what care and information is given at each visit. It has been suggested that women who have low-risk pregnancies should have fewer antenatal visits. However, when this was tested, women with fewer visits had babies who were much more likely to be admitted to neonatal intensive care and stay there for longer (though this could be down to chance results).

A 2015 Cochrane Review findings buttresses this notion, with evidence that in settings with limited resources, where the number of visits is already low, programmes of ANC with reduced visits are associated with an increase in perinatal mortality. Therefore, it is doubtful that the reduced visits model is ideal, even in low-income countries (LICs), where pregnant women are already attending fewer appointments. Not only is visiting prenatal care early is highly recommended, but also a more flexible pathway allowing more visits, from the time a pregnant woman books for prenatal care, as it potentially enables more attention to those women who come late. Also, women who had fewer antenatal visits were not as satisfied with the care they received compared with women who had the standard number of visits.

share of mothers receiving at least one antenatal visit during pregnancy

Share of mothers receiving at least four antenatal visits during pregnancy

== Examinations ==
At the initial antenatal care visit, pregnant women are classified into either low risk or high risk. Antenatal risk assessment began in the United Kingdom before becoming a widespread practice.

Prenatal screening is testing for diseases or conditions in a fetus or embryo before it is born, and prenatal diagnosis refers to the official confirmation of these potential diseases or conditions. Obstetricians and midwives have the ability to monitor mother's health and prenatal development during pregnancy through series of regular check-ups.

Physical examinations generally consist of:

- Collection of the mother's (and general family) medical history
- Checking blood pressure of the mother
- Documentation of the mother's height and weight
- Pelvic exam
- Doppler fetal heart rate monitoring
- Blood and urine tests on the mother
- Discussion with caregiver

In some countries, such as the UK, the symphysial fundal height (SFH) is measured as part of antenatal appointments from 25 weeks of gestation. (The SFH is measured from the woman's pubic bone to the top of the uterus. A review into this practice found only one piece of research, so there is not enough evidence to say whether measuring the SFH helps to detect small or large babies. As measuring the SFH is not costly and is used in many places, the review recommends carrying on this practice.

Growth charts are a way of detecting small babies by measuring the SFH. There are two types of growth chart:

1. Population-based chart, which shows a standard growth and size for each baby
2. Customized growth chart, which is calculated by looking at the mother's height and weight, along with the weights of their previous babies.

Examples of these growth charts are created by the World Health Organization and Centers for Disease Control and Prevention, which differ based on the sex of the infant, and can be found at: https://www.cdc.gov/growthcharts/who-charts.html A review looking into which of these charts detected small babies found that there is no good quality research to show which is best. More research is needed before the customized growth charts are recommended because they cost more money and take more time for healthcare workers to make.

== Ultrasounds ==
Obstetric ultrasounds are most commonly performed during the second trimester at approximately week 20. Ultrasounds are considered relatively safe and have been used for over 35 years for monitoring pregnancy. Among other things, ultrasounds are used to:

- Diagnose pregnancy (uncommon)
- Check for the number of fetuses (e.g., twins, triplets, etc.)
- Assess possible risks to the mother (e.g., miscarriage, blighted ovum, ectopic pregnancy, or a molar pregnancy condition)
- Check for fetal malformation (e.g., club foot, spina bifida, cleft palate, clenched fists)
- Determine if an intrauterine growth retardation condition exists
- Note the development of fetal body parts (e.g., heart, brain, liver, stomach, skull, other bones)
- Check the amniotic fluid and umbilical cord for possible problems
- Determine the due date and how far along the mother is based on measurements and relative developmental progress

Generally, an ultrasound is ordered whenever an abnormality is suspected, or along a schedule similar to the following:

- 7 weeks — confirm pregnancy, ensure that it's neither molar nor ectopic, determine due date
- 13–14 weeks (some areas) — evaluate the possibility of Down syndrome
- 18–20 weeks — see the expanded list above
- 34 weeks (some areas) — evaluate the size, verify the placental position

A review looking at routine ultrasounds past 24 weeks found that there is no evidence to show any benefits to the mother or the baby.

Early scans mean that multiple pregnancies can be detected at an early stage of pregnancy and also gives more accurate due dates so that fewer women are induced who do not need to be.

Levels of feedback from the ultrasound can differ. High feedback is when the parents can see the screen and are given a detailed description of what they can see. Low feedback is when the findings are discussed at the end, and the parents are given a picture of the ultrasound. The different ways of giving feedback affect how much the parents worry and the mother's health behaviour, although there is not enough evidence to make clear conclusions. In a small study, mothers receiving high feedback were more likely to stop smoking and drinking alcohol; however, the quality of the study is low, and more research is needed to say for certain which type of feedback is better.

Women experiencing a complicated pregnancy may have a test called a Doppler ultrasound to look at the blood flow to their unborn baby. This is performed to detect signs that the baby is not getting a normal blood flow and therefore is 'at risk'. A review looked at performing Doppler ultrasounds on all women, even if they were at 'low risk' of having complications. The review found that routine Doppler ultrasounds may have reduced the number of preventable baby deaths, but the evidence was not strong enough to recommend that they should be made routine for all pregnant women.

== Prevention of Maternal Deaths ==
The leading causes of maternal death in the United States are overdose, homicide, and suicide. Of these causes, unintentional drug overdose was the leading cause at 5.2 deaths per 100,000 live births, and homicide and suicide accounted for 3.9 deaths per 100,000 live births. Preventing these unnecessary deaths starts in the prenatal period. Some screenings ask pregnant women about suicidal ideation and other common mental health conditions through the Patient Health Questionnaire (PHQ 2 or 9), the Generalized Anxiety Screener (GAD 3 or 7), and the Pregnancy/Postnatal Depression Scale (EPDS). However, these screenings lack thoroughness in their ability to create a full picture of a person's mental well-being due to the standardized nature of the screener. Earlier intervention in the pregnancy through asking about coping mechanisms, home life, financial stability, employment, and past trauma can create a clearer perspective of a pregnant person's emotional and mental well-being.

Prevention of homicide and interpersonal violence for pregnant women and birthing persons can lead to better mental health and maternal mortality outcomes for pregnant individuals. Homicides were committed 77% of the time with a firearm. Screening for firearms in the household or firearm use could prevent some of these deaths. Additionally, another mode of prevention can occur through state Red Flag laws. These laws help keep firearms out of the way of people who could harm someone.

Currently, most maternal deaths, 62%, occur after the 42 days up until 1 year post-partum. The standard of care is one follow-up visit 6-weeks post-partum. The American College of Obstetricians and Gynecologists (ACOG) has recommended that this standard include more visits within 12 weeks, but this recommendation has not yet become the standard practice of care. Due to the limited amount of check-ups post-partum, many women and birthing people may feel isolated at the beginning of motherhood. 21.8% of American Indian/Alaska Native people report symptoms of post-partum depression compared to 16.3% of Black, non-Hispanic, 15.4% Multiple Race, Non-Hispanic, 13.8% Hispanic, 11.7% White, and 8% Asian. Systemic racism can exacerbate symptoms of post-partum depression through making it harder to access medical care, implicit bias in providers, and race-based traumatic stress (RBTS). Creating more avenues for women and birthing people to have interactions with a doctor or trusted medical professional could create better mental health outcomes. Asking about existing support networks in place for these women and birthing people can also aid medical professionals in learning about gaps in their patients' network of care.

== Diet ==
Main article: Prenatal nutrition

Prenatal care not only applies to the parent carrying the baby, but it also applies to the sperm donor. Sperm affects the fetus's ability to grow properly, and proper nutrition is one of the main factors. For example, a zinc deficiency can lead to sperm deformations and reduced sperm motility which can cause infertility or improper fertilization of the egg, which has the potential to cause miscarriages or fetal deformities. Spina bifida, which is caused by a folic acid deficiency, is another example of the effects of prenatal malnutrition. Foods are typically fortified with folic acid to reduce this, but some flours like masa flour are not within those federal outlines, which is theorized to be why Hispanic women are most likely to have children with spina bifida. Because of all this, it is normally encouraged that women take a prenatal vitamin to prevent these fetal deformations and deficiency symptoms.

== Exercise ==
Research suggests that physical activity levels during pregnancy can impact delivery outcomes. A study examining the effects of exercise intensity on delivery type and risk of preterm birth found that varying levels of physical activity were linked to different pregnancy outcomes and associated risks.

Very low levels of physical activity are associated with an increased risk of both preterm and instrumental deliveries. Pregnant individuals with minimal activity may experience lower overall fitness and muscle tone, which can impact the body's ability to manage the physical demands of labor. Another study showed that individuals with higher handgrip strength are more likely to have a vaginal delivery, as greater muscle strength and endurance can support the labor process. In contrast, those who gained more weight during pregnancy or had larger arm and calf circumferences were more likely to undergo cesarean delivery, particularly in cases of nonprogressive labor. Low levels of physical activity during pregnancy have been linked to a slightly elevated risk of cesarean delivery. Regular moderate exercise may help enhance pelvic muscle tone and cardiovascular fitness, potentially reducing the likelihood of cesarean intervention by supporting the body's endurance during labor.

For individuals seeking to engage in levels of vigorous or high-intensity physical activity, one study did observe a slight increase in instrumental delivery, which involves the use of medical tools like forceps or vacuum devices. More intense physical activity may add extra demands on the body, potentially affecting labor progression and increasing the need for instrumental assistance. Pregnant individuals need to consult with their healthcare provider before beginning or adjusting exercise routines, particularly if they are new to regular physical activity or have any health conditions that may affect pregnancy, as this can add additional stress to the body.

== Types of care ==
=== Individual vs group ===
Group prenatal care, in recent years, has been implemented in around 22 countries that are aiming to improve maternal care. This type of care offers a group of multiple pregnant women (typically around 8-12 of them that are in a similar stage of pregnancy) to see one or more providers simultaneously, along with following up every few weeks to these group appointments for continual care. Group antenatal care is beneficial in terms of reduced cost, increased education, and increased sense of support. It has also been found that women who used group prenatal care visits were more likely to utilize family planning services after the baby had been delivered.

=== Midwife-led ===
Midwife-led care is where a midwife team (and general practitioner, if needed) leads the care a woman receives, and she does not usually see a specialist doctor during her pregnancy. Midwife-led care is typically used by women with low-risk pregnancies. Women with midwife-led pregnancies are more likely to give birth without being induced; instead, they partake in natural labor. However, they are less likely to have their waters broken, an instrumental delivery, episiotomy, or preterm birth. However, around the same number of women in each group underwent a caesarean section.

In the UK, private companies like Neighbourhood Midwives have supplemented the provision of the NHS, although the model has not always been financially successful.

=== Self-led ===
In many countries, women are given a summary of their case notes, including important background information about their pregnancy, such as their medical history, growth charts, and scan reports. If the mother goes to a different hospital for care or to give birth, the summary of her case notes can be used by the midwives and doctors until her hospital notes arrive. A review looking into women keeping their case notes shows they have a higher risk of having a caesarean section. However, the women reported feeling more in control having their notes and would like to have them again in future pregnancies. 25% of women reported their hospital notes were lost in the hospital, though none of the women forgot to take their notes to any appointments.

== Access to care ==
In 2018, it was found that a million women in the United States did not receive adequate prenatal care, which was defined as attending 80 percent of the recommended prenatal care visits or beginning prenatal care during the first trimester. Transportation is one of the biggest threats to prenatal care access, making it hard for pregnant women in rural communities to have access to proper prenatal care. Specifically, over half of the people in rural areas who are seeking prenatal care have to travel at least 30 minutes to receive care, and there are higher rates of clinic closures in rural areas. Because of Telemedicine, the gap in care due to transportation issues has been reduced.

=== Telemedicine ===
A new alternative for some of the routine prenatal care visits is Telemedicine, which is an online route of performing these prenatal appointments, and became more of a standardized practice due to the COVID pandemic. Specifically, over half of pregnant women were afraid of stepping foot inside a hospital because of the risk of contracting the virus, so Telemedicine offered a way of communication that was not face to face, but would still get people the care they required. In depth obstetric examinations and blood work are not possible through Telemedicine, but other appointment tasks are possible, such as using personal devices to detect fetal heart rate, conducting maternal mental health consults, and general sharing of information between provider and patient. Overall, Telemedicine is seen as an improvement in prenatal care because it offers the potential for higher accessibility of care to marginalized groups. However, it does tend to be younger, White patients who utilize Telemedicine because of their increased access to and familiarity with technology.

=== Racial disparities ===
Main article: Racial health disparities

Racial differences are also prevalent in prenatal care, especially because there is a trend of reduced funding for Black and Hispanic communities. All racial minorities also experience higher levels of perinatal mortality, especially Black individuals. Racial minorities are also more likely to have high-risk pregnancies and conditions such as preeclampsia, gestational diabetes, and gestational hypertension. Because race and class are very heavily intertwined, there is a complex relationship between race and preterm birth risks that cannot be simplified into a specific cause. However, pregnant Black women who encounter racism end up having physiological changes in their amniotic fluid and alterations in immune and endocrine mechanisms. Women of color are less likely to access prenatal care within the first trimester than white women, and Black women have the least amount of access to prenatal care out of all racial minorities.

=== Class-based Health Disparities ===
The World Health Organization (WHO) reported that in 2015, around 830 women died every day from problems in pregnancy and childbirth. Only 5 lived in high-income countries, and the rest lived in low-income countries. A study examined the differences in early and low-weight birth deliveries between local and immigrant women and saw that the difference was caused by receiving prenatal care. The study, between 1997 and 2008, looked at 21,708 women giving birth in a region of Spain. The results indicated that very preterm birth (VPTB) and very low birth weight (VLBW) were much more common for immigrants than locals. The study showed the importance of prenatal care and how universal prenatal care would help people of all origins get proper care before pregnancy/birth.

=== Increasing Access ===
There are many ways of changing health systems to help women access antenatal care, such as new health policies, educating health workers, and health service reorganization. Community interventions to help people change their behavior can also play a part. Examples of interventions are media campaigns reaching many people, enabling communities to take control of their health, informative-education-communication interventions, and financial incentives. A review looking at these interventions found that one intervention helps improve the number of women receiving antenatal care. However, interventions used together may reduce baby deaths in pregnancy and early life, lower the number of low birth weight babies born, and improve the number of women receiving antenatal care.

== See also ==
- Brain health and pollution
- Reproductive Health Supplies Coalition
